= Stafford Township School District =

School district in Ocean County, New Jersey, US

Address
- 775 East Bay Avenue Manahawkin, Ocean County, New Jersey, 08050; United States
- Coordinates: 39.683342°N 74.233088°W

District information
- Grades: PreK to 6
- Superintendent: George Chidiac
- Business administrator: Lourdes LaGuardia
- Schools: 5

Students and staff
- Enrollment: 2,198 (as of 2018–19)
- Faculty: 190.0 FTEs
- Student–teacher ratio: 11.6:1

Other information
- District Factor Group: DE
- Website: www.staffordschools.org
Ind.	Per pupil	District spending	Rank (*)	K-6 average	%± vs. average
1A	Total Spending	$18,807	40	$18,891	−0.4%
1	Budgetary Cost	14,090	28	13,649	3.2%
2	Classroom Instruction	8,325	20	8,366	−0.5%
6	Support Services	2,511	39	2,161	16.2%
8	Administrative Cost	1,335	15	1,467	−9.0%
10	Operations & Maintenance	1,752	39	1,552	12.9%
16	Median Teacher Salary	56,033	26	57,437
Data from NJDoE 2014 Taxpayers' Guide to Education Spending. *Of K-6 districts with any number of students. Lowest spending=1; Highest=59

The Stafford Township School District is a community public school district that serves students in pre-kindergarten through sixth grade from Stafford Township, in Ocean County, in the U.S. state of New Jersey.

As of the 2018–19 school year, the district, comprising five schools, had an enrollment of 2,198 students and 190.0 classroom teachers (on an FTE basis), for a student–teacher ratio of 11.6:1.

The district participates in the Interdistrict Public School Choice Program, having been approved in July 2002 to participate in the program. Seats in the program for non-resident students are specified by the district and are allocated by lottery, with tuition paid for participating students by the New Jersey Department of Education.

The district is classified by the New Jersey Department of Education as being in District Factor Group "DE", the fifth-highest of eight groupings. District Factor Groups organize districts statewide to allow comparison by common socioeconomic characteristics of the local districts. From lowest socioeconomic status to highest, the categories are A, B, CD, DE, FG, GH, I and J.

For seventh through twelfth grades, public school students are served by the Southern Regional School District, which serves the five municipalities in the Long Beach Island Consolidated School District — Barnegat Light, Harvey Cedars, Long Beach Township, Ship Bottom and Surf City — along with students from Beach Haven and Stafford Township, together with students from Ocean Township who attend as part of a sending/receiving relationship with the Ocean Township School District. Schools in the district (with 2018–19 enrollment data from the National Center for Education Statistics) are Southern Regional Middle School with 934 students in grades 7–8 and Southern Regional High School with 1,952 students in grades 9–12. Both schools are in the Manahawkin section of Stafford Township.

At the time of its founding in 1957, the Southern Regional School District had a roughly equal number of students from Long Beach Island and Stafford Township. By 2016, the overwhelming majority of students were from Stafford Township, accounting for nearly 90% of enrollment. These demographic changes have led to significant discrepancies in the cost per pupil sent to the district from each community, with Harvey Cedars and Long Beach Township paying more than $200,000 per pupil, while Stafford Township's costs are $3,600 for each student. These widely different costs result from a formula that uses the taxable property value in each municipality to apportion costs, which means that municipalities with relatively high property values and small numbers of students pay a higher share of total district costs. Some residents of Long Beach Island communities are seeking to amend the formula to take advantage of a 1993 law that allows districts to use both property value and enrollment to allocate property taxes, though that would require passage of referendums in each municipality.

== Schools ==
Schools in the district (with 2018–19 enrollment data from the National Center for Education Statistics) are:

Preschool

- Oxycocus School with 178 students in pre-kindergarten
  - William Wilkinson, principal
- Ronald L. Meinders Primary Learning Center with 274 students in kindergarten
  - Dawn Reo, principal

Elementary schools

- Ocean Acres Elementary School with 527 students in grades 1 and 2
  - Susan D'Alessandro, principal
- McKinley Avenue Elementary School with 570 students in grades 3 and 4
  - Tiffany Eberle, principal

Intermediate school

- Stafford Intermediate School with 651 students in grades 5 and 6
  - Hope Zaun, principal

== Administration ==
Core members of the district's administration are:

- George Chidiac, superintendent
- Lourdes LaGuardia, business administrator and board secretary

== Board of education ==
The district's board of education, comprised of nine members, sets policy and oversees the fiscal and educational operation of the district through its administration. As a Type II school district, the board's trustees are elected directly by voters to serve three-year terms of office on a staggered basis, with three seats up for election each year held (since 2012) as part of the November general election. The board appoints a superintendent to oversee the district's day-to-day operations and a business administrator to supervise the business functions of the district.
