= Beach Haven School District =

School district in Ocean County, New Jersey, US

Address
- 700 South Beach Avenue Beach Haven, Ocean County, New Jersey, 08008; United States
- Coordinates: 39.558192°N 74.242015°W

District information
- Grades: PreK to 6
- Superintendent: Theodore Loeffler
- Business administrator: Steve Terhune
- Schools: 1

Students and staff
- Enrollment: 63 (as of 2023–24)
- Faculty: 10.1 FTEs
- Student–teacher ratio: 6.2:1

Other information
- District Factor Group: FG
- Website: www.beachhavenschool.com
Ind.	Per pupil	District spending	Rank (*)	K-6 average	%± vs. average
1A	Total Spending	$26,027	57	$18,891	37.8%
1	Budgetary Cost	21,234	56	13,649	55.6%
2	Classroom Instruction	13,059	59	8,366	56.1%
6	Support Services	2,569	41	2,161	18.9%
8	Administrative Cost	1,847	50	1,467	25.9%
10	Operations & Maintenance	3,440	58	1,552	121.6%
13	Extracurricular Activities	63	29	39	61.5%
16	Median Teacher Salary	47,829	4	57,437
Data from NJDoE 2014 Taxpayers' Guide to Education Spending. *Of K-6 districts with any number of students. Lowest spending=1; Highest=59

The Beach Haven School District is a community public school district that serves students in pre-kindergarten through sixth grade from Beach Haven, in Ocean County, in the U.S. state of New Jersey.

As of the 2023–24 school year, the district, comprised of one school, had an enrollment of 63 students and 10.1 classroom teachers (on an FTE basis), for a student–teacher ratio of 6.2:1. In the 2016–17 school year, Beach Haven had the 3rd-smallest enrollment of any school district in the state, with 70 students.

The district participates in the Interdistrict Public School Choice Program, which allows non-resident students to attend school in the district at no cost to their parents, with tuition covered by the resident district. Available slots are announced annually by grade.

The district had been classified by the New Jersey Department of Education as being in District Factor Group "FG", the fourth-highest of eight groupings. District Factor Groups organize districts statewide to allow comparison by common socioeconomic characteristics of the local districts. From lowest socioeconomic status to highest, the categories are A, B, CD, DE, FG, GH, I and J.

For seventh through twelfth grades, public school students attend the Southern Regional School District, which serves the five municipalities in the Long Beach Island Consolidated School District (Barnegat Light, Harvey Cedars, Long Beach Township, Ship Bottom and Surf City), along with students from Beach Haven and Stafford Township, as well as the sending district of Ocean Township. Schools in the district (with 2023–24 enrollment data from the National Center for Education Statistics) are Southern Regional Middle School with 849 students in grades 7–8 and Southern Regional High School with 1,865 students in grades 9–12. Both schools are in the Manahawkin section of Stafford Township.

== School ==
Beach Haven Elementary School, the district's lone school, served 63 students in pre-kindergarten through sixth grade as of the 2023–24 school year.

== Administration ==
Core members of the district's administration are:

- Theodore Loeffler, superintendent
- Steve Terhune, business administrator and board secretary

== Board of education ==
The district's board of education, composed of five members, sets policy and oversees the fiscal and educational operation of the district through its administration. As a Type II school district, the board's trustees are elected directly by voters to serve three-year terms of office on a staggered basis, with either one or two seats up for election each year held (since 2012) as part of the November general election. The board appoints a superintendent to oversee the district's day-to-day operations and a business administrator to supervise the business functions of the district.
