= Tuckerton School District =

School district in Ocean County, New Jersey, US

Address
- 213 Marine Street Tuckerton, Ocean County, New Jersey, 08087; United States
- Coordinates: 39.601755°N 74.336764°W

District information
- Grades: PreK-6
- Superintendent: Siobhan Grayson
- Business administrator: John Fallia
- Schools: 1

Students and staff
- Enrollment: 284 (as of 2022–23)
- Faculty: 32.0 FTEs
- Student–teacher ratio: 8.9:1

Other information
- District Factor Group: CD
- Website: www.tesnj.com
Ind.	Per pupil	District spending	Rank (*)	K-6 average	%± vs. average
1A	Total Spending	$15,857	13	$18,891	−16.1%
1	Budgetary Cost	12,427	10	13,649	−9.0%
2	Classroom Instruction	7,454	9	8,366	−10.9%
6	Support Services	2,168	28	2,161	0.3%
8	Administrative Cost	983	2	1,467	−33.0%
10	Operations & Maintenance	1,604	33	1,552	3.4%
13	Extracurricular Activities	158	40	39	305.1%
16	Median Teacher Salary	48,529	5	57,437
Data from NJDoE 2014 Taxpayers' Guide to Education Spending. *Of K-6 districts with any number of students. Lowest spending=1; Highest=59

The Tuckerton School District is a community public school district that serves students in public school for pre-kindergarten through sixth grade from the borough of Tuckerton, in Ocean County, in the U.S. state of New Jersey.

As of the 2022–23 school year, the district, comprised of one school, had an enrollment of 284 students and 32.0 classroom teachers (on an FTE basis), for a student–teacher ratio of 8.9:1.

The district is classified by the New Jersey Department of Education as being in District Factor Group "CD", the sixth-highest of eight groupings. District Factor Groups organize districts statewide to allow comparison by common socioeconomic characteristics of the local districts. From lowest socioeconomic status to highest, the categories are A, B, CD, DE, FG, GH, I and J.

Public school students in seventh through twelfth grades attend the schools of the Pinelands Regional School District, which also serves students from Bass River Township, Eagleswood Township and Little Egg Harbor Township. Schools in the district (with 2020–21 enrollment data from the National Center for Education Statistics) are Pinelands Regional Junior High School with 526 students in grades 7-8 and Pinelands Regional High School with 1,036 students in grades 9-12. The district's board of education includes nine members directly elected by the residents of the constituent municipalities to three-year terms on a staggered basis, with three seats up for election each year. Tuckerton is allocated one of the nine seats.

== School ==
Tuckerton Elementary School had an enrollment of 278 students as of the 2020–21 school year (based on enrollment data from the National Center for Education Statistics).

- Siobhan Grayson, principal

== Administration ==
Core members of the district's administration are:

- Siobhan Grayson, superintendent of schools
- John Fallia, business administrator
- Christine Somers, board secretary
- Matthew Faas, assistant principal & director of curriculum and instruction
- Marni Zito, supervisor of special education

== Board of education ==
The district's board of education is composed of nine members who set policy and oversee the fiscal and educational operation of the district through its administration. As a Type II school district, the board's trustees are elected directly by voters to serve three-year terms of office on a staggered basis, with three seats up for election each year held (since 2012) as part of the November general election. The board appoints a superintendent to oversee the district's day-to-day operations and a business administrator to supervise the business functions of the district.
