= Bay Head School District =

School district in Monmouth County, New Jersey, US

Address
- 145 Grove Street Bay Head, Monmouth County, New Jersey, 08742
- Coordinates: 40.069764°N 74.049446°W

District information
- Grades: K-8
- Superintendent: Adam L. Angelozzi
- Business administrator: Christopher Mullins
- Schools: 1

Students and staff
- Enrollment: 120 (as of 2023–24)
- Faculty: 15.1 FTEs
- Student–teacher ratio: 8.0:1

Other information
- District Factor Group: I
- Website: www.bayheadschool.org
Ind.	Per pupil	District spending	Rank (*)	K-8 average	%± vs. average
1A	Total Spending	$23,690	62	$18,891	25.4%
1	Budgetary Cost	19,147	58	14,159	35.2%
2	Classroom Instruction	10,908	61	8,659	26.0%
6	Support Services	3,537	56	2,167	63.2%
8	Administrative Cost	1,284	5	1,547	−17.0%
10	Operations & Maintenance	2,876	64	1,612	78.4%
13	Extracurricular Activities	440	64	104	323.1%
16	Median Teacher Salary	53,394	14	61,136
Data from NJDoE 2014 Taxpayers' Guide to Education Spending. *Of K-8 districts with up to 400 students. Lowest spending=1; Highest=71

The Bay Head School District is a community public school district that serves students in pre-kindergarten through eighth grade from Bay Head, in Ocean County, in the U.S. state of New Jersey.

As of the 2023–24 school year, the district, comprised of one school, had an enrollment of 120 students and 15.1 classroom teachers (on an FTE basis), for a student–teacher ratio of 8.0:1. In the 2016–17 school year, the district was ranked as the 18th-smallest in the state.

The district had been classified by the New Jersey Department of Education as being in District Factor Group "I", the second-highest of eight groupings. District Factor Groups organize districts statewide to allow comparison by common socioeconomic characteristics of the local districts. From lowest socioeconomic status to highest, the categories are A, B, CD, DE, FG, GH, I and J.

Students in public school for ninth through twelfth grades attend Point Pleasant Beach High School in Point Pleasant Beach, as part of a sending/receiving relationship with the Point Pleasant Beach School District, together with students from Lavallette and Mantoloking. As of the 2023–24 school year, the high school had an enrollment of 326 students and 38.3 classroom teachers (on an FTE basis), for a student–teacher ratio of 8.5:1.

== History ==
Bay Head School was flooded in October 2012 when Hurricane Sandy hit New Jersey. First Response Disaster Restoration Specialists mobilized from Indiana to expedite the restoration process.

== School ==
Bay Head Elementary School had an enrollment of 120 students in grades K–8 in the 2023–24 school year.

- Frank Camardo, principal

== Administration ==
Core members of the district's administration are:

- Adam L. Angelozzi, superintendent
- Christopher Mullins, business administrator and board secretary

== Board of education ==
The district's board of education is comprised of five members who set policy and oversee the fiscal and educational operation of the district through its administration. As a Type II school district, the board's trustees are elected directly by voters to serve three-year terms of office on a staggered basis, with either one or two seats up for election each year held (since 2012) as part of the November general election. The board appoints a superintendent to oversee the district's day-to-day operations and a business administrator to supervise the business functions of the district.
