= Island Heights School District =

School district in Ocean County, New Jersey, US

Address
- 115 Summit Avenue Island Heights, Ocean County, New Jersey, 08732
- Coordinates: 39°57′N 74°09′W

District information
- Grades: K-6
- Superintendent: Lisa A. Royer
- Business administrator: Craig Lorentzen
- Schools: 1

Students and staff
- Enrollment: 133 (as of 2022–23)
- Faculty: 13.3 FTEs
- Student–teacher ratio: 10.0:1

Other information
- District Factor Group: GH
- Website: www.islandheights.k12.nj.us
Ind.	Per pupil	District spending	Rank (*)	K-6 average	%± vs. average
1A	Total Spending	$17,824	31	$18,891	−5.6%
1	Budgetary Cost	15,038	35	13,649	10.2%
2	Classroom Instruction	9,566	37	8,366	14.3%
6	Support Services	1,412	5	2,161	−34.7%
8	Administrative Cost	1,845	47	1,467	25.8%
10	Operations & Maintenance	2,110	50	1,552	36.0%
13	Extracurricular Activities	86	36	39	120.5%
16	Median Teacher Salary	51,756	8	57,437
Data from NJDoE 2014 Taxpayers' Guide to Education Spending. *Of K-6 districts with any number of students. Lowest spending=1; Highest=59

The Island Heights School District is a community public school district that serves students in kindergarten through sixth grade from Island Heights in Ocean County, in the U.S. state of New Jersey.

As of the 2022–23 school year, the district, comprised of one school, had an enrollment of 133 students and 13.3 classroom teachers (on an FTE basis), for a student–teacher ratio of 10.0:1. In the 2016–17 school year, Island Heights had the 14th-smallest enrollment of any school district in the state, with 126 students.

The district participates in the Interdistrict Public School Choice Program, which allows non-resident students to attend school in the district at no cost to their parents, with tuition covered by the resident district. Available slots are announced annually by grade.

The district had been classified by the New Jersey Department of Education as being in District Factor Group "GH", the third-highest of eight groupings. District Factor Groups organize districts statewide to allow comparison by common socioeconomic characteristics of the local districts. From lowest socioeconomic status to highest, the categories are A, B, CD, DE, FG, GH, I and J.

Public school students in seventh through twelfth grades attend the schools of the Central Regional School District, which also serves students from the municipalities of Berkeley Township, Ocean Gate, Seaside Heights and Seaside Park. As of the 2022–23 school year, the high school district, comprised of two schools, had an enrollment of 2,344 students and 190.2 classroom teachers (on an FTE basis), for a student–teacher ratio of 12.3:1. Schools in the district (with 2022–23 enrollment data from the National Center for Education Statistics) are Central Regional Middle School with 769 students in grades 7 - 8 and Central Regional High School with 1,483 students in grades 9 - 12. The district's board of education has nine members, who are directly elected by the residents of the constituent municipalities to three-year terms of office on a staggered basis, with three seats up for election each year. Island Heights is allocated one of the board's nine seats.

== Awards and recognition ==
Island Heights Elementary School was one of nine schools in New Jersey honored in 2020 by the National Blue Ribbon Schools Program, which recognizes high student achievement.

== Schools ==
- Island Heights Elementary School had an enrollment of 131 students as of the 2022–23 school year.
  - Lisa A. Royer, principal

== Administration ==
Core members of the district's administration are:

- Lisa A. Royer, superintendent
- Craig Lorentzen, business administrator / board secretary

== Board of education ==
The district's board of education, comprised of nine members, sets policy and oversees the fiscal and educational operation of the district through its administration. As a Type II school district, the board's trustees are elected directly by voters to serve three-year terms of office on a staggered basis, with three seats up for election each year held (since 2012) as part of the November general election. The board appoints a superintendent to oversee the district's day-to-day operations and a business administrator to supervise the business functions of the district.
