= Eagleswood Township School District =

School district in Ocean County, New Jersey, US

Coordinates: 39.687135°N 74.265964°W

Address
- 511 Route 9 West Creek, Ocean County, New Jersey, 08092; United States

District information
- Grades: Pre-K to 6
- Superintendent: Stephanie Bush (acting)
- Business administrator: Micah Bender
- Schools: 1

Students and staff
- Enrollment: 151 (as of 2023–24)
- Faculty: 15.6 FTEs
- Student–teacher ratio: 9.7:1

Other information
- District Factor Group: B
- Website: www.eagleswood.org
Ind.	Per pupil	District spending	Rank (*)	K-6 average	%± vs. average
1A	Total Spending	$19,549	46	$18,891	3.5%
1	Budgetary Cost	16,233	44	13,649	18.9%
2	Classroom Instruction	10,321	47	8,366	23.4%
6	Support Services	2,507	37	2,161	16.0%
8	Administrative Cost	1,845	47	1,467	25.8%
10	Operations & Maintenance	1,465	23	1,552	−5.6%
16	Median Teacher Salary	50,898	7	57,437
Data from NJDoE 2014 Taxpayers' Guide to Education Spending. *Of K-6 districts with any number of students. Lowest spending=1; Highest=59

The Eagleswood Township School District is a community public school district that serves students in pre-kindergarten through sixth grade from Eagleswood Township in Ocean County, in the U.S. state of New Jersey.

As of the 2023–24 school year, the district, comprised of one school, had an enrollment of 151 students and 15.6 classroom teachers (on an FTE basis), for a student–teacher ratio of 9.7:1.

Public school students in seventh through twelfth grades attend the schools of the Pinelands Regional School District, which also serves students from Bass River Township, Little Egg Harbor Township and Tuckerton Borough. Schools in the district (with 2023–24 enrollment data from the National Center for Education Statistics) are Pinelands Regional Junior High School with 503 students in grades 7-8 and Pinelands Regional High School with 1,077 students in grades 9-12. The district's board of education is composed of nine members directly elected by the residents of the constituent municipalities to three-year terms on a staggered basis, with three seats up for election each year. Eagleswood Township is allocated one of the nine seats.

== History ==
In the 2016–17 school year, Eagleswood had the 20th smallest enrollment of any school district in the state, with 141 students.

The district had been classified by the New Jersey Department of Education as being in District Factor Group "B", the second-lowest of eight groupings. District Factor Groups organize districts statewide to allow comparison by common socioeconomic characteristics of the local districts. From highest socioeconomic status to lowest, the categories are A, B, CD, DE, FG, GH, I and J.

== School ==
The Eagleswood Township Elementary School had an enrollment of 150 students in grades PreK-6 in the 2023–24 school year.

== Administration ==
Core members of the district's administration are:

- Stephanie Bush, acting superintendent
- Stephen Brennan, business administrator / board secretary

== Board of education ==
The district's board of education, comprised of five members, sets policy and oversees the fiscal and educational operation of the district through its administration. As a Type II school district, the board's trustees are elected directly by voters to serve three-year terms of office on a staggered basis, with either one or two seats up for election each year held (since 2012) as part of the November general election. The board appoints a superintendent to oversee the district's day-to-day operations and a business administrator to supervise the business functions of the district.
