= Lavallette School District =

School district in Ocean County, New Jersey, US

Address
- 105 Brooklyn Avenue Lavallette, Ocean County, New Jersey, 08735; United States
- Coordinates: 39.968307°N 74.07002°W

District information
- Grades: K-8
- Superintendent: Lisa Gleason
- Business administrator: Patricia Christopher
- Schools: 1

Students and staff
- Enrollment: 155 (as of 2022–23)
- Faculty: 18.0 FTEs
- Student–teacher ratio: 8.6:1

Other information
- District Factor Group: DE
- Website: www.lavallettek12.org
Ind.	Per pupil	District spending	Rank (*)	K-8 average	%± vs. average
1A	Total Spending	$21,858	53	$18,891	15.7%
1	Budgetary Cost	17,463	54	14,159	23.3%
2	Classroom Instruction	10,453	52	8,659	20.7%
6	Support Services	2,696	47	2,167	24.4%
8	Administrative Cost	1,846	58	1,547	19.3%
10	Operations & Maintenance	1,814	40	1,612	12.5%
13	Extracurricular Activities	445	65	104	327.9%
16	Median Teacher Salary	59,875	43	61,136
Data from NJDoE 2014 Taxpayers' Guide to Education Spending. *Of K-8 districts with up to 400 students. Lowest spending=1; Highest=71

The Lavallette School District is a community public school district that serves students in kindergarten through eighth grade from Lavallette, in Ocean County, in the U.S. state of New Jersey.

As of the 2022–23 school year, the district, comprising one school, had an enrollment of 155 students and 18.0 classroom teachers (on an FTE basis), for a student–teacher ratio of 8.6:1. In the 2016–17 school year, Lavallette was tied as the 23rd-smallest enrollment of any school district in the state, with 146 students.

The district is classified by the New Jersey Department of Education as being in District Factor Group "DE", the fifth-highest of eight groupings. District Factor Groups organize districts statewide to allow comparison by common socioeconomic characteristics of the local districts. From lowest socioeconomic status to highest, the categories are A, B, CD, DE, FG, GH, I and J.

Students in public school for ninth through twelfth grades attend Point Pleasant Beach High School in Point Pleasant Beach, as part of a sending/receiving relationship with the Point Pleasant Beach School District, together with students from Bay Head and Mantoloking. As of the 2020–21 school year, the high school had an enrollment of 382 students and 36.9 classroom teachers (on an FTE basis), for a student–teacher ratio of 10.4:1.

== History ==
In 2017, the Appellate Division affirmed a decision by the New Jersey Department of Education allowing students from Seaside Park the option of attending school for grades K-6 in either the Toms River Regional Schools or in Lavallette under the terms of a dual sending/receiving relationship. The Lavallette district had actively supported the proposal when the original petition was submitted in 2015.

== School ==
Schools in the district are:

- Lavallette Elementary School, which had an enrollment of 156 students as of the 2020–21 school year.

== Administration ==
Core members of the district's administration are:

- Lisa Gleason, superintendent
- Patricia Christopher, business administrator and board secretary

== Board of education ==
The district's board of education is comprised of five members who set policy and oversee the fiscal and educational operation of the district through its administration. As a Type II school district, the board's trustees are elected directly by voters to serve three-year terms of office on a staggered basis, with either one or two seats up for election each year held (since 2012) as part of the November general election. The board appoints a superintendent to oversee the district's day-to-day operations and a business administrator to supervise the business functions of the district.
