= Boyd Elementary School =

Boyd Elementary School may refer to:

- Hugh J. Boyd, Jr. Elementary School - Seaside Heights, New Jersey - Seaside Heights School District
- Mariam Boyd Elementary School - Warrenton, North Carolina - Warren County Schools
- William M. Boyd Elementary School - Atlanta, Georgia - Atlanta Public Schools
