= Seaside Heights School District =

School district in Ocean County, New Jersey, US

Address
- 1200 Bay Boulevard Seaside Heights, Ocean County, New Jersey, 08751
- Coordinates: 39.946012°N 74.078539°W

District information
- Grades: K-6
- Superintendent: Douglas Corbett
- Business administrator: Kevin O'Shea
- Schools: 1

Students and staff
- Enrollment: 198 (as of 2022–23)
- Faculty: 24.0 FTEs
- Student–teacher ratio: 8.3:1

Other information
- District Factor Group: A
- Website: www.sshschool.org
Ind.	Per pupil	District spending	Rank (*)	K-6 average	%± vs. average
1A	Total Spending	$30,178	59	$18,891	59.7%
1	Budgetary Cost	16,029	42	13,649	17.4%
2	Classroom Instruction	9,031	29	8,366	7.9%
6	Support Services	3,781	55	2,161	75.0%
8	Administrative Cost	1,347	16	1,467	−8.2%
10	Operations & Maintenance	1,554	30	1,552	0.1%
13	Extracurricular Activities	227	42	39	482.1%
16	Median Teacher Salary	62,664	46	57,437
Data from NJDoE 2014 Taxpayers' Guide to Education Spending. *Of K-6 districts with any number of students. Lowest spending=1; Highest=59

The Seaside Heights School District is a community public school district for students in kindergarten through sixth grade from Seaside Heights, in Ocean County, in the U.S. state of New Jersey. The district's board of education is made up of five members, each elected to three-year terms.

As of the 2022–23 school year, the district, comprised of one school, had an enrollment of 198 students and 24.0 classroom teachers (on an FTE basis), for a student–teacher ratio of 8.3:1.

The district is classified by the New Jersey Department of Education as being in District Factor Group "A", the lowest of eight groupings. District Factor Groups organize districts statewide to allow comparison by common socioeconomic characteristics of the local districts. From lowest socioeconomic status to highest, the categories are A, B, CD, DE, FG, GH, I and J.

Public school students in seventh through twelfth grades attend the schools of the Central Regional School District, which also serves students from the municipalities of Berkeley Township, Island Heights, Ocean Gate and Seaside Park. Schools in the district (with 2020–21 enrollment data from the National Center for Education Statistics) are Central Regional Middle School with 842 students in grades 7 and 8 and Central Regional High School with 1,568 students in grades 9 - 12. The high school district's board of education is composed of nine members, who are directly elected by the residents of the constituent municipalities to three-year terms of office on a staggered basis, with three seats up for election each year. Seaside Heights is allocated one of the board's nine seats.

== History ==
The original school facility, Seaside Heights Elementary School, was built in 1926 and later demolished after the opening of a larger school building on the bay front. The current school was built in the late 1960s, and is dedicated to Hugh J. Boyd Jr., its longtime superintendent of schools who died in 1983. The district's Early Childhood Center addition was dedicated in 2007 in the name of longtime Board of Education Member Harry M. Smith III.

From 2003 to 2012, the Toms River Regional Schools provided administrative, maintenance, food and other services to the Seaside Heights Board of Education. The Seaside Heights district had been overseen by Toms River central administration until April 2012 when the board elected to align with Central Regional superintendent Triantafillos Parlapanides.

In December 2023, the district considered a vote on the possibility of closing the school, ending its sending relation with the Central Regional School District and merge with the Toms River Regional Schools. Voters were to decide on a merger in a referendum to be held on April 16, 2024; if approved, Hugh J. Boyd Elementary School could remain open for as long as five years while the merger takes place. The voters ultimately chose not to merge.

== School ==
Hugh J. Boyd Jr. Elementary School served 233 students as of the 2020–21 school year. The school was built in 1967, and is dedicated to Hugh J. Boyd Jr., its late, longtime superintendent of schools. Its addition built in 2005 is dedicated in the name of longtime Board of Education member Harry M. Smith III.

- Chris Raichle, principal

== Administration ==
Core members of the district's administration are:

- Douglas Corbett, superintendent of schools
- Kevin O'Shea, business administrator and board secretary

== Board of education ==
The district's board of education, composed of five members, sets policy and oversees the fiscal and educational operation of the district through its administration. As a Type II school district, the board's trustees are elected directly by voters to serve three-year terms of office on a staggered basis, with either one or two seats up for election each year held (since 2012) as part of the November general election. The board appoints a superintendent to oversee the district's day-to-day operations and a business administrator to supervise the business functions of the district.
