= Brindletown, New Jersey =

Populated place in Ocean County, New Jersey, US

- Unincorporated community
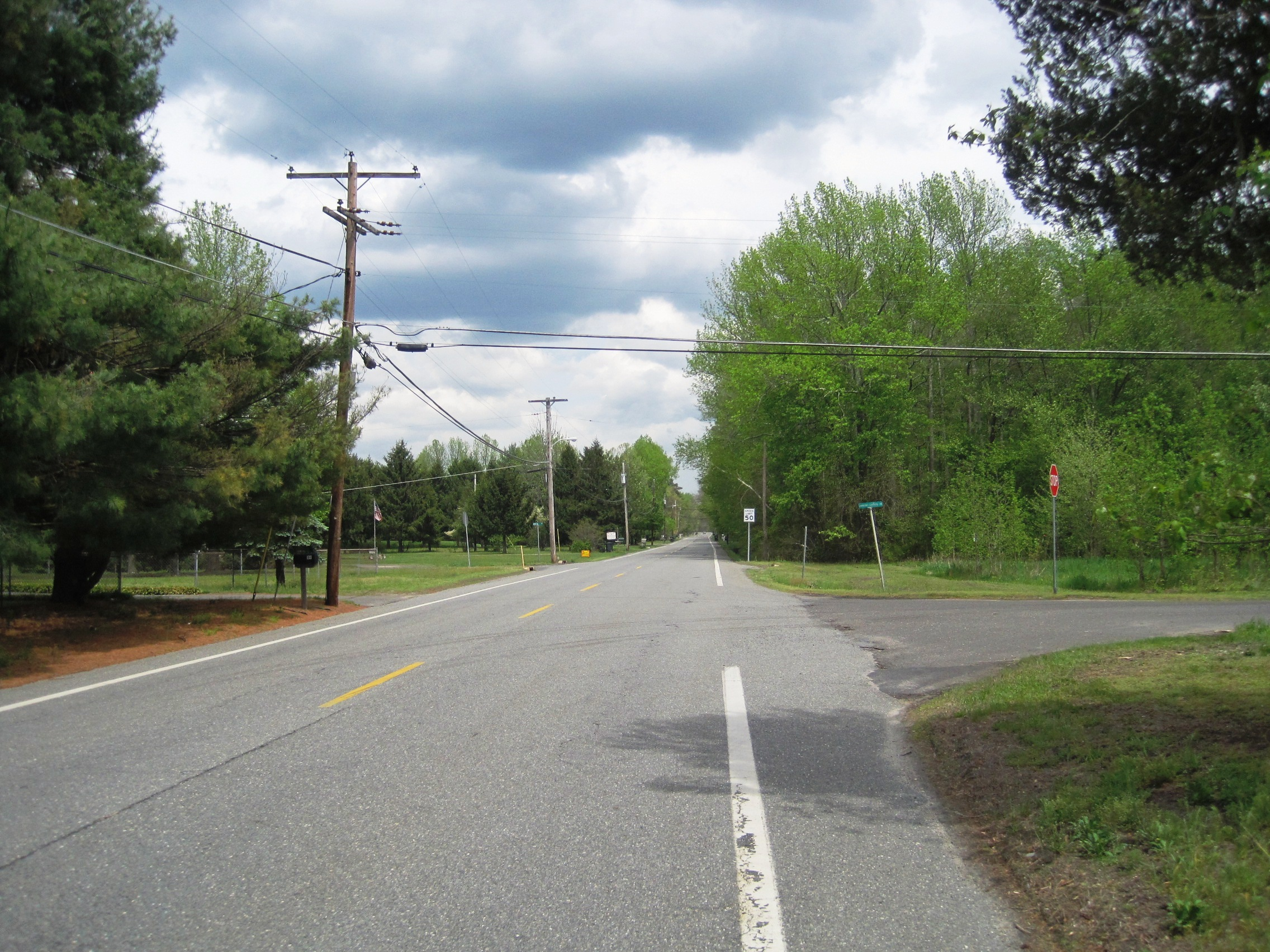
- Intersection of Long Swamp Road and Cranberry Canners Road

- Brindletown's location in Ocean County (Inset: Ocean County in New Jersey) Brindletown, New Jersey (New Jersey) Brindletown, New Jersey (the United States)
- Coordinates: 40°02′50″N 74°30′19″W
- Country: United States
- State: New Jersey
- County: Ocean
- Township: Plumsted
- Elevation: 89 ft (27 m)
- GNIS feature ID: 874947

Brindletown (also known as Brindle Town) is an unincorporated community located within Plumsted Township, in Ocean County, in the U.S. state of New Jersey. Brindletown was once a village home to a hotel, a mill, and large estates overlooking Brindle Lake. Brindletown was purchased by the federal government to expand Camp Dix in the 1920s (later known as Fort Dix).

The site of the original Brindletown is within a weapons training site though the site of the current Brindletown is accessible to the public. The current settlement is centered about the intersection of Long Swamp Road and Carter Lane to the north of the original site. Houses line Long Swamp Road and other surrounding roads in the area while some farms are found to the north of Long Swamp Road. The portion of the community within the confines of Fort Dix is mostly forest.
