= Seaside Park School District =

Public school district in Seaside Park, New Jersey

Coordinates: 39.911565°N 74.079274°W

- Central & Fourth Avenues; Seaside Park, NJ 08752

District information
- Grades: K-6
- Superintendent: Thomas Gialanella (interim)
- Business administrator: Barry J. Parliman
- Schools: 1

Students and staff
- Enrollment: 71 (as of 2008-09)
- Faculty: 10.0 FTEs
- Student–teacher ratio: 7.8

Other information
- District Factor Group: DE
Ind.	Per pupil	District spending	Rank (*)	K-6 average	%± vs. average
1	Budgetary Cost	20,532	59	12,195	68.4%
2	Classroom Instruction	13,330	61	7,366	81.0%
6	Support Services	3,379	58	1,832	84.4%
8	Administrative Cost	1,657	49	1,389	19.3%
10	Operations & Maintenance	1,436	30	1,472	−2.4%
13	Extracurricular Activities	25	16	40	−37.5%
16	Median Teacher Salary	46,820	9	52,691
Data from NJDoE 2009 Taxpayers' Guide to Education Spending. *Of K-6 districts with any number of students. Lowest spending=1; Highest=62

The Seaside Park School District is a non-operating community public school district that operated one school serving students in Kindergarten through sixth grade from Seaside Park, in the U.S. state of New Jersey, until it closed at the end of the 2009-10 school year.

District officials announced in May 2010 that the school would be closing and that students would attend elementary schools in the nearby Toms River Regional Schools for grades K-6. Officials cited costs of $37,000 per student if the school remained open, versus $10,500 per student if attending the Toms River district. The shared services agreement was renewed for the 2013-2014 school year.

As of the 2008-09 school year, the district's one school had an enrollment of 71 students and 11.6 classroom teachers (on an FTE basis), for a student–teacher ratio of 6.1.

The district was classified by the New Jersey Department of Education as being in District Factor Group "DE", the fifth-highest of eight groupings. District Factor Groups organize districts statewide to allow comparison by common socioeconomic characteristics of the local districts. From lowest socioeconomic status to highest, the categories are A, B, CD, DE, FG, GH, I and J.

Public school students in seventh through twelfth grades attend the schools of the Central Regional School District, which serves students from Island Heights and from the municipalities of Berkeley Township, Ocean Gate, Seaside Heights and Seaside Park. Schools in the district (with 2017-18 enrollment data from the National Center for Education Statistics) are Central Regional Middle School for grades 7 and 8 (761 students) and Central Regional High School for grades 9 - 12 (1,401 students). The district's Board of Education consists of nine members, who are directly elected by the residents of the constituent municipalities to three-year terms of office on a staggered basis, with three seats up for election each year. Seaside Park is allocated one of the board's nine seats.

== Schools ==
- Seaside Park Elementary School had an enrollment of 71 students in the 2008-09 school year.
  - Thomas Matthews, principal

== Administration ==
Core members of the district's / school's administration were:

- Thomas Gialanella, interim superintendent
- Barry J. Parliman, business administrator and board secretary
