= RWJBarnabas Health Arena =

Arena in Toms River, New Jersey

Coordinates: 39.9822°N 74.1958°W

- Interactive map of RWJBarnabas Health Arena
- Former names: The Ritacco Center (2003-2010); Poland Spring Arena (2010-2011); Pine Belt Arena (2011-2018)
- Address: 1245 Old Freehold Road
- Location: Toms River, New Jersey, U.S.
- Owner: Toms River Regional Schools
- Capacity: 3,208

Construction
- Opened: 2003

Tenants
- Toms River North Mariners

The RWJBarnabas Health Arena (formerly known as the Ritacco Center, Poland Spring Arena, and Pine Belt Arena) is a 3,208-seat multi-purpose arena in Toms River, New Jersey. Opened in 2003, the facility hosts various local concerts and sporting events for the area.

== History and use ==
Connected to Toms River High School North, the public arena is considered a centerpiece of the Toms River Regional School District. First opened on June 14, 2004, the facility is used by the high school and the school district for many functions, including the inaugural senior graduation by the Class of '04.

The arena's main use is for high school basketball games, and is home to the Toms River North Mariners basketball teams as well as teams from other high schools in Toms River. Concerts and other events are also held throughout the year to raise money for the school district.

For trade shows, RJW Barnabas Healthcare Arena has 19,939 sq ft (1,852.4 m^{2}) of space.

The arena was utilized as a concert venue in 2005, 2006, and 2008, for Toms River Fest. The facility hosted many well-known musicians and bands, including: KC and the Sunshine Band, Meat Loaf, Joan Jett and the Black Hearts, LeAnn Rimes, Hilary Duff, Carrie Underwood, Gavin DeGraw, and Daughtry, among others.

In February 2018 and 2019, the arena hosted the WWE NXT Live, a house show. In March 2019, the arena hosted the NJSIAA Tournament of Champions for girls' and boys' basketball.

The facility has seen a marked decline in public events, outside of school-related games, since March 2020, due to the COVID-19 pandemic. It was utilized as a COVID-19 vaccine clinic by the Ocean County Health Department in 2021.

== Names changes ==
The building was originally named The Ritacco Center, after Michael Ritacco, then-superintendent of Toms River Regional Schools, with Poland Spring coming on board as a major sponsor shortly afterwards. In the wake of a bribery scandal, culminating in Ritacco's arrest by the FBI on October 21, 2010, the school district quickly acted to remove his name from the building, opting to call it the Poland Spring Arena instead. The Ritacco Center name was covered with tarps beginning October 26, 2010, the use of the name was discontinued elsewhere including the website and exterior signage was permanently removed in October 2011, though additional occurrences of the name were discovered on parking lot signs in mid-2012 these were subsequently taped over before being scraped off.

In July 2011, the school district announced a new name sponsor for the venue, after the Pine Belt Auto Group signed a $500,000 contract for the naming rights for five years.

In January 2018, the name was officially changed to the "RWJBarnabas Health Arena" after the district signed a five-year deal with RWJBarnabas Health under which the district will be paid a total of $637,500 for the naming rights.
