= West Tuckerton, New Jersey =

Populated place in Ocean County, New Jersey, US

- Unincorporated community
- West Tuckerton's location in Ocean County (Inset: Ocean County in New Jersey) West Tuckerton, New Jersey (New Jersey) West Tuckerton, New Jersey (the United States)
- Coordinates: 39°36′05″N 74°21′13″W
- Country: United States
- State: New Jersey
- County: Ocean
- Township: Little Egg Harbor
- Elevation: 20 ft (6 m)
- ZIP Code: 08087
- GNIS feature ID: 0881732

West Tuckerton is an unincorporated community located within Little Egg Harbor Township in Ocean County, in the U.S. state of New Jersey. It is commonly mistaken as part of Tuckerton Borough, which it borders. West Tuckerton is usually defined as Little Egg Harbor's "town center", but the boundaries extend all the way to the Bay and contains many subdivisions that are not normally considered part of West Tuckerton and usually mistaken to be part of neighboring Mystic Island.
