= Pinelands Regional School District =

School district in Ocean County, New Jersey, US

Address
- 520 Nugentown Road Little Egg Harbor, Ocean County, New Jersey, 08087
- Coordinates: 39.612389°N 74.358295°W

District information
- Grades: 7-12
- Superintendent: Melissa McCooley (currently suspended); Kimberly Clark (acting)
- Business administrator: Amanda Miller
- Schools: 2

Students and staff
- Enrollment: 1,592 (as of 2023–24)
- Faculty: 143.6 FTEs
- Student–teacher ratio: 11.1:1

Other information
- District Factor Group: B
- Website: www.pinelandsregional.org
Ind.	Per pupil	District spending	Rank (*)	7-12 average	%± vs. average
1A	Total Spending	$22,510	33	$18,891	19.2%
1	Budgetary Cost	16,954	35	14,586	16.2%
2	Classroom Instruction	9,327	26	8,339	11.8%
6	Support Services	2,936	38	2,114	38.9%
8	Administrative Cost	1,695	27	1,561	8.6%
10	Operations & Maintenance	2,192	35	1,798	21.9%
13	Extracurricular Activities	658	12	673	−2.2%
16	Median Teacher Salary	58,422	4	65,769
Data from NJDoE 2014 Taxpayers' Guide to Education Spending. *Of 7-12 districts with any number of students. Lowest spending=1; Highest=47

Pinelands Regional School District is a regional school district in Ocean County, in the U.S. state of New Jersey, serving students from Eagleswood Township, Little Egg Harbor Township and Tuckerton Borough along with the Burlington County municipality of Bass River Township.

As of the 2023–24 school year, the district, comprised of two schools, had an enrollment of 1,592 students and 143.6 classroom teachers (on an FTE basis), for a student–teacher ratio of 11.1:1.

The district participates in the Interdistrict Public School Choice Program, which allows non-resident students to attend school in the district at no cost to their parents, with tuition covered by the resident district. Available slots are announced annually by grade.

== History ==
Pinelands Regional High School officially opened on September 5, 1979, as a Junior-Senior High School, originally housing students in seventh through twelfth grades from Tuckerton, Little Egg Harbor, Bass River, and Eagleswood. Prior to the opening of the school, students from those communities had attended Southern Regional School District in the Manahawkin section of Stafford Township, which had been dealing for years with overcrowding.

The building originally held grades 7–8 on the third floor, 9–10 on the second, and 11–12 on the first. The building featured an experimental open classroom design, where a large group of students of varying skill levels would be in a single, large classroom with several teachers overseeing them; and contained no interior walls. With students complaining that they were distracted by the noise from other classes, the rooms were walled off and separated by floor-to-ceiling folding partitions.

In 1991, Pinelands Middle School opened across the street for students in grades 7–8. Also in the 1990s, a new building was completed next to the high school, which houses a daycare center called "Rainbow Express". Students taking childcare classes attend class in this building to help with the daycare kids. In 2002, the Middle School was expanded and the 9th grade was moved there, at which time it was renamed "Pinelands Regional Junior High School".

In 2017, voters approved a bond referendum for renovations to both schools, including new roofing, bathrooms, new masonry in the High School building, and other cosmetic and safety upgrades. Renovation work on the High School was halted after workers discovered asbestos and roofing nails dislodged in the commons area. The high school building was closed for the entirety of the 2018–19 school year while renovations were completed; portable classrooms were installed at the junior high school to accommodate five grades of students, while 7th graders attended the nearby Frog Pond Elementary School.

In 2018, Melissa McCooley, already superintendent of Little Egg Harbor schools, also became superintendent of Pinelands Regional schools, having two positions at one time.

In September 2019, the high school re-opened, housing grades 9-12 for the first time since 2002.

The district had been classified by the New Jersey Department of Education as being in District Factor Group "B", the second-lowest of eight groupings. District Factor Groups organize districts statewide to allow comparison by common socioeconomic characteristics of the local districts. From the lowest socioeconomic status to highest, the categories are A, B, CD, DE, FG, GH, I and J.

== Schools ==
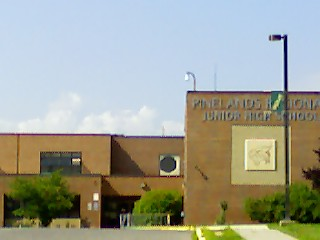
Pinelands Regional Junior High School

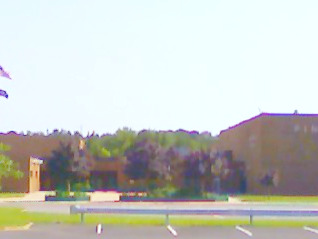
Pinelands Regional High School

Schools in the district (with 2023-24 enrollment data from the National Center for Education Statistics) are:

- Pinelands Regional Junior High School had 503 students in grades 7–8. Opened in September 1991.
  - F. Eric Pschorr, principal
- Pinelands Regional High School had 1,077 students in grades 9–12. Opened in September 1979.
  - Troy Henderson, principal

Both schools are located directly across the street from each other on Nugentown Road, near the border of Little Egg Harbor and Tuckerton.

== WCAT ==
WCAT is a Television station on local channel 21 for the area that the district serves. Most of the cast and crew is made up of students who take the class as an elective. The channel shows live morning announcements at 7:32am daily, followed by a commercial or short skit made by members of the WCAT class. Throughout the day, especially during lunch periods, other school programs or past school events are shown on the channel, usually shown on TVs in the cafeteria. Throughout the rest of the day, however, the channel is composed of school or community announcements typical of public-access television cable TV networks.

== Notable faculty ==
- Sarann Kraushaar, former vice-principal of the school, who was the mistress of murderer Robert O. Marshall, whose slayings inspired the bestselling book Blind Faith, and was later a miniseries of the same name, in which a character based on Kraushaar and a fictional incarnation of the school is featured.
- Lily McBeth (born 1934), transgender former substitute teacher at the school who made national news after she underwent a sex-change operation.

== Administration ==
Core members of the district's administration are:

- Melissa McCooley, superintendent (currently suspended)
- Kimberly Clark, acting superintendent
- Amanda Miller, business administrator and board secretary

== Board of education ==
The district's board of education, comprised of nine members, sets policy and oversees the fiscal and educational operation of the district through its administration. As a Type II school district, the board's trustees are elected directly by voters to serve three-year terms of office on a staggered basis, with three seats up for election each year held (since 2012) as part of the November general election. The board appoints a superintendent to oversee the district's day-to-day operations and a business administrator to supervise the business functions of the district. Representatives are elected on the basis of the constituent population, with six seats allocated to Little Egg Harbor Township, and one each allocated to Bass River Township, Eagleswood Township and Tuckerton.
