= Pinelands Regional High School =

School district in Ocean County, New Jersey, US

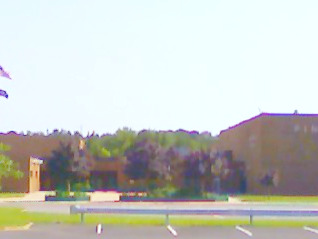

Location
- 590 Nugentown Road; Little Egg Harbor Township, Ocean County, New Jersey 08087; United States; 39.613208°N 74.362346°W

Information
- Type: Public high school
- Established: September 1979
- School district: Pinelands Regional School District
- NCES School ID: 341300005917
- Principal: Troy Henderson
- Faculty: 79.7 FTEs
- Grades: 9-12
- Enrollment: 1,063 (as of 2024–25)
- Student to teacher ratio: 13.4:1
- Campus: Suburban
- Colors: Green; Gold
- Athletics conference: Shore Conference
- Team name: Wildcats
- Accreditation: Middle States Association of Colleges and Schools
- Publication: The Scratching Post
- Yearbook: A Cat Tale
- Website: www.pinelandsregional.org/o/phs

Pinelands Regional High School (PRHS) is a four-year regional public high school that serves students in ninth through twelfth grades from Eagleswood Township, Little Egg Harbor Township and Tuckerton in Ocean County and from Bass River Township, in Burlington County, in the U.S. state of New Jersey, operating as part of the Pinelands Regional School District. The school is overseen by the New Jersey Department of Education and has been accredited by the Middle States Association of Colleges and Schools Commission on Elementary and Secondary Schools since 1986.

As of the 2024–25 school year, the school had an enrollment of 1,063 students and 79.7 classroom teachers (on an FTE basis), for a student–teacher ratio of 13.4:1. There were 446 students (42.0% of enrollment) eligible for free lunch and 82 (7.7% of students) eligible for reduced-cost lunch.

== History ==
Prior to the opening of the school, students from those towns had attended Southern Regional School District in Manahawkin. Constructed on a site covering 79 acres (32 ha) at a cost of $9.7 million (equivalent to $43.0 million in 2025), Pinelands Regional High School officially opened on September 5, 1979, as a Junior-Senior High School, originally housing grades 7–11 from Tuckerton, Little Egg Harbor, Bass River, and Eagleswood, while seniors finished their education at Southern Regional.

The building originally housed grades 7–8 on the third floor, 9–10 on the second, and 11–12 on the first. During the first school year (1979-1980) there was no senior class, as those students were allowed finish the year at Southern Regional High School. The building featured an experimental "open classroom" design, where a large group of students of varying skill levels would be in a single, large classroom with several teachers overseeing them; and contained no interior walls. However, this format didn't last long, and in the 1980s, the rooms were walled off, and separated by floor-to-ceiling folding partitions.

In 1991, Pinelands Middle School opened across the street for students in grades 7–8. Also in the 90s, a new building was completed next to the high school, which houses a daycare center called "Rainbow Express". Students taking Child Care classes go to class in this building to help with the daycare kids. In 2002, the Middle School was expanded and the 9th grade was moved there. When the expansion was completed at the Middle School, it was renamed "Pinelands Regional Junior High School" while the High School was renamed the "Senior High School", although this name is rarely used.

After rejecting all three referendum questions the previous November, voters approved all three bond questions in January 2017 to cover the costs of a $53.6 million renovation and upgrade job to address structural issues in the high school and junior high school. By October, the school was closed indefinitely due to complications in the construction process, with classes temporarily moved to available locations at the junior high school. In September 2019, the high school re-opened, housing grades 9–12 for the first time since 2002.

== Awards, recognition and rankings ==
The school was the 185th-ranked public high school in New Jersey out of 339 schools statewide in New Jersey Monthly magazine's September 2014 cover story on the state's "Top Public High Schools", using a new ranking methodology. The school had been ranked 173rd in the state of 328 schools in 2012, after being ranked 262nd in 2010 out of 322 schools listed. The magazine ranked the school 241st in 2008 out of 316 schools. The school was ranked 254th in the magazine's September 2006 issue, which surveyed 316 schools across the state.

Schooldigger.com ranked the school 254th out of 376 public high schools statewide in its 2010 rankings (a decrease of 2 positions from the 2009 rank) which were based on the combined percentage of students classified as proficient or above proficient on the language arts literacy and mathematics components of the High School Proficiency Assessment (HSPA).

== Athletics ==
The Pinelands Regional High School Wildcats compete in Division B South of the Shore Conference, an athletic conference comprised of public and private high schools in Monmouth and Ocean counties along the Jersey Shore. The league operates under the jurisdiction of the New Jersey State Interscholastic Athletic Association (NJSIAA). With 796 students in grades 10-12, the school was classified by the NJSIAA for the 2019–20 school year as Group III for most athletic competition purposes, which included schools with an enrollment of 761 to 1,058 students in that grade range. The school was classified by the NJSIAA as Group III South for football for 2024–2026, which included schools with 695 to 882 students.

The school's Amy Beykrich was the individual cross country champion in Group II in 1995.

The school's cheerleading team was state champions in 2012, the team's fifth state championship, after winning four consecutive titles from 2004 through 2007. The team finished third in the nation in the years of 2010, 2011 and 2012 at the UCA National Cheerleading Championship.

Pinelands finished a historic 2026 season by going 11-1, which featured a perfect 9-0 regular season and saw them clinch the B South Division Title for the first time since 1987. They would reach the South Jersey Group III sectional final before losing 29-13 to Seneca.

== Drama department ==
Pinelands Regional's drama and theater program has been highly successful, especially in the past several years. In 2010, the team won 19 awards at the annual Speech and Theatre Association of New Jersey competition at Rutgers University, including 8 Governor's awards, which are the highest honors in the state to be given for education. In 2017, the school had been honored with the Governor's Awards in Arts Theatre Competition for the 12th year in a row.

== Cat TV ==
Cat TV is Pinelands Regional's local Public-access television cable TV station sponsored by Comcast Cable. It is located on channel 21 for the area that the district serves. Most of the cast and crew is comprised of students who take the video production classes as an elective. The channel shows live morning announcements at 8:15 am daily, followed by a commercial or short skit made by members of the video productions class. Throughout the day, especially during lunch periods, other school programs or past school events are shown on the channel. The remainder of the time the channel broadcasts school and community events through the Infochannel program, along with a simulcast of lite-rock station WWZY. The communities which it serves are Little Egg Harbor Township, Tuckerton, Eagleswood Township and Bass River Township.

== Administration ==
The school's principal is Troy Henderson. His core administration team includes three assistant principals.

== Notable alumni ==
- Gaten Matarazzo (born 2002, class of 2020), actor who has appeared in the Netflix original series Stranger Things.
- Britt Rescigno, chef

== Notable faculty ==
- Sarann Kraushaar, former vice-principal of the school, who was the mistress of murderer Robert O. Marshall, whose slayings inspired the bestselling book Blind Faith, and was later a miniseries of the same name, in which a character based on Kraushaar and a fictional incarnation of the school is featured.
- Lily McBeth (born 1934), transgender former substitute teacher at the school who made national news after undergoing a sex-change operation and quit a position as a substitute teacher at the school.
