= Osbornsville, New Jersey =

Populated place in Ocean County, New Jersey, US

- Unincorporated community
- Osbornsville's location in Ocean County (Inset: Ocean County in New Jersey) Osbornsville, New Jersey (New Jersey) Osbornsville, New Jersey (the United States)
- Coordinates: 40°02′18″N 74°06′27″W
- Country: United States
- State: New Jersey
- County: Ocean
- Township: Brick
- Elevation: 13 ft (4 m)
- GNIS feature ID: 879025

Osbornsville (or Osbornville) is an unincorporated community located within Brick Township in Ocean County, in the U.S. state of New Jersey.

== History ==
The settlement was named for early settlers, the Osborn family. In 1882, Osbornsville was described as "a thrifty, flourishing village of 720 inhabitants", and in 1909, it was described as an "especially favorable location for a summer resort".

An airport for small aircraft opened in Osbornville in 1942. Known as Osbornville Airport, Huppert Airport, and Ocean County Airport, it had two unpaved runways and an Aeronca Aircraft Corporation dealership, and was used for flight training, passenger flights, and aircraft service. The airport ceased operation in 1954 after the main hangar and 10 aircraft were destroyed by fire. The property was subdivided into building lots in 1958, and became Sky Manor Estates, one of the first housing developments built after the Garden State Parkway opened to commuters. Several streets in Sky Manor have aviation-themed names, such as Boeing Drive, Lockheed Road, and Northrop Road.
