= Point Pleasant Beach High School =

Public secondary school in Ocean County, New Jersey, United States

Location
- 700 Trenton Avenue; Point Pleasant Beach, Ocean County, New Jersey 08742; United States; 40.08932°N 74.051917°W

Information
- Type: Public high school
- Motto: "The Few, The Proud, The Beach"
- School district: Point Pleasant Beach School District
- NCES School ID: 341332004702
- Principal: Nathan Grosshandler
- Faculty: 38.3 FTEs
- Grades: 9-12
- Enrollment: 326 (as of 2023–24)
- Student to teacher ratio: 8.5:1
- Colors: Red and white
- Athletics conference: Shore Conference
- Team name: Garnet Gulls
- Accreditation: Middle States Association of Colleges and Schools
- Website: www.ptbeach.com/o/ppbhs

Point Pleasant Beach High School is a four-year, comprehensive community public high school that serves students in ninth through twelfth grades from Point Pleasant Beach in Ocean County, in the U.S. state of New Jersey, operating as the lone secondary school of the Point Pleasant Beach School District. The school has been accredited by the Middle States Association of Colleges and Schools Commission on Elementary and Secondary Schools since 1939 and is accredited through July 2025.

In addition to the students of Point Pleasant Beach, the high school serves the students of Bay Head and Lavallette for grades 9-12 and those from Mantoloking for K-12, as part of sending/receiving relationships, as well as some students who attend on a tuition basis. The district earned more than $650,000 in revenue by accepting 85 tuition-paying students in 2015–16, many of whom played on the school's athletic teams, leading to claims that the school is competing unfairly with other schools that don't accept outside students.

As of the 2023–24 school year, the school had an enrollment of 326 students and 38.3 classroom teachers (on an FTE basis), for a student–teacher ratio of 8.5:1. There were 23 students (7.1% of enrollment) eligible for free lunch and 12 (3.7% of students) eligible for reduced-cost lunch.

== History ==
The building in the block between Trenton and Forman Avenues was originally constructed in 1908, replacing a building nearby built in 1886 when Point Pleasant Beach was still part of Brick Township. It has been renovated and expanded several times since. Students from Brick Township, New Jersey attended the school until Brick Township High School opened in September 1958. The school served students from both Point Pleasant Beach and Point Pleasant Borough students until the Point Pleasant Borough High School was built in 1963.

In March 2009, the school debuted the musical The Wedding Singer as the first amateur performance of the show in New Jersey.

== Awards, recognition and rankings ==
The school was the 83rd-ranked public high school in New Jersey out of 339 schools statewide in New Jersey Monthly magazine's September 2014 cover story on the state's "Top Public High Schools", using a new ranking methodology. The school had been ranked 78th in the state of 328 schools in 2012, after being ranked 58th in 2010 out of 322 schools listed. The magazine ranked the school 59th in 2008 out of 316 schools, and was the top-ranked school in Ocean County in 2010 (Point Pleasant Boro High School was next with a ranking of 133rd). The school was ranked 68th in the magazine's September 2006 issue, which included 316 schools across the state. In 2009, the school was ranked 59th in the state. Schooldigger.com ranked the school tied for 70th out of 381 public high schools statewide in its 2011 rankings (an increase of 104 positions from the 2010 ranking) which were based on the combined percentage of students classified as proficient or above proficient on the mathematics (89.7%) and language arts literacy (96.6%) components of the High School Proficiency Assessment (HSPA).

== Athletics ==
The Point Pleasant Beach High School Garnet Gulls compete in Division B Central of the Shore Conference, an athletic conference comprised of public and private high schools in Monmouth and Ocean counties along the Jersey Shore. The league operates under the jurisdiction of the New Jersey State Interscholastic Athletic Association (NJSIAA). With 251 students in grades 10–12, the school was classified by the NJSIAA for the 2019–20 school year as Group I for most athletic competition purposes, which included schools with an enrollment of 75 to 476 students in that grade range. The school was classified by the NJSIAA as Group I South for football for 2024–2026, which included schools with 185 to 482 students. The mascot is the Garnet Gull, and the school colors are red and white.

The school participates in joint cooperative boys / girls bowling, gymnastics, ice hockey and boys / girls swimming teams with Point Pleasant Beach High School as the host school / lead agency. These co-op programs operate under agreements scheduled to expire at the end of the 2023–24 school year.

The boys track team won the indoor track Group I state championship in 1978.

The girls' track team won the Group I state indoor relay championship in 1984.

The boys' tennis team won the Group I state championship in 2002 (vs. Jonathan Dayton High School) and 2003 (vs. Middlesex High School). The 2002 team became the county's first tennis program to win a state title, after winning the Group I state championship by defeating Cresskill High School 4–1 in the semifinals and then topping Jonathan Dayton 3–2 in the finals.

The 2008 girls' tennis team won the Central Jersey Group I state sectional title with a 3–2 win over Highland Park High School. The team lost to Leonia High School 3½-1½ in the semifinals of the 2008 Group I state tournament. The 2010 girls' tennis team won the Group I state sectional title and went on to win the Group I state title with a 4–1 win against Haddon Township High School.

The 2010–11 seasons proved to be one of the most successful athletic years in the school's history. Girls' soccer, girls' tennis, cross country, ice hockey, boys' and girls' swimming, baseball and softball all won divisional titles with many of the teams going deep into the Shore Conference Tournament. Several of the teams qualified for the state playoffs, with girls' tennis winning the overall title.

In 2010, the girls' soccer team won their conference title, division title, and the Central Jersey Group I state sectional championship with a 1–0 win against Metuchen High School, the first sectional title in the history of the program.

The 2011-12 boys' soccer team won the NJSIAA Central Jersey Group I sectional title, the program's first, with a 1–0 over Burlington City High School and finishing the season with a record of 13–8–1.

The girls' basketball team won the Group I state championship in 2013, defeating Bloomfield Tech High School by a score of 56–54 in the tournament final played at the Pine Belt Arena.

The 2013 boys' basketball team won both a divisional title and the Central Jersey Group I sectional title, the first in program history, with a 69–40 win over Bound Brook High School. The team won the Group I title in 2013 with a 43–29 win against Jonathan Dayton High School in the finals played at the Rutgers Athletic Center.

In 2013, the football team finished the season with a record of 11–2 after defeating division rival Shore Regional High School by a score of 12–7 to win the Central Jersey Group I state sectional title, the program's first in its history, avenging a 31–0 loss to Shore Regional just a week earlier in the Shore Conference divisional title game.

The school maintains a rivalry with nearby St. Rose High School and Shore Regional High School. The school has had a longstanding football rivalry with Shore Regional, which leads the series with an overall record of 30-12 through the 2017 season, including the games in which the two teams faced each other in the Central Jersey Group I championship game in both 2013 and 2014. NJ.com listed the rivalry at 29th on their 2017 list "Ranking the 31 fiercest rivalries in N.J. HS football".

The boys' wrestling team won the Central Jersey Group I state sectional championship in 2016-2018 and 2020. The 2014 wrestling team set a school record for wins and finished 27–5. They also won their fourth straight divisional title and were Central Jersey Group 1 finalists. The divisional title was their 18th in the past 25 years. The 2015-16 wrestling team defeated Manville High School 37–25 to win the Central Jersey Group I state sectional title, the first in the program's history.

The ice hockey team won the Dowd Cup in 2020.

The baseball team won the Central Jersey Group I state sectional championship in 2022, 2023 and 2024. The 2024 team finished with a record of 25–5, including a 14–0 record in the Shore Conference Class B Central division, ending the season with a 14–4 loss to Pompton Lakes High School in the Group I championship game, the program's first title game appearance.

== Administration ==
The school's principal is Nathan Grosshandler.

== Notable alumni ==
- Jason Cairns, retired soccer forward who played professionally for the Cincinnati Riverhawks and the New Jersey Stallions
- Matt Farrell (born 1996), basketball player
- Katelynn Flaherty (born 1996), former basketball player for the Michigan Wolverines, who is the school's all-time leading scorer in points, man or woman, with 2,776 career points
- Jack Ford, TV legal commentator
- Alfred M. Gray Jr. (1928–2024), 29th Commandant of the Marine Corps, from July 1, 1987, to June 30, 1991
- James W. Holzapfel (born 1944), member of the New Jersey Senate since 2012
- Paul Kanitra (born 1979), politician who has represented the 10th legislative district in the New Jersey General Assembly since 2024
- Leonard Lomell (1920–2011), U.S. Army Ranger who played a pivotal role in destroying German gun emplacements on D-Day
