= Ocean Township School District (Ocean County, New Jersey) =

School district in Ocean County, New Jersey, US

Address
- 64 Railroad Avenue Waretown, Ocean County, New Jersey, 08758; United States
- Coordinates: 39.788817°N 74.200444°W

District information
- Grades: PreK-6
- Superintendent: Christopher Lommerin
- Business administrator: Steven Terhune
- Schools: 2

Students and staff
- Enrollment: 510 (as of 2018–19)
- Faculty: 53.6 FTEs
- Student–teacher ratio: 9.5:1

Other information
- District Factor Group: CD
- Website: District website
| Ind. | Per pupil | District spending | Rank (*) | K-6 average | %± vs. average |
|---|---|---|---|---|---|
| 1A | Total Spending | $18,798 | 39 | $18,891 | −0.5% |
| 1 | Budgetary Cost | 16,395 | 46 | 13,649 | 20.1% |
| 2 | Classroom Instruction | 9,844 | 41 | 8,366 | 17.7% |
| 6 | Support Services | 2,633 | 42 | 2,161 | 21.8% |
| 8 | Administrative Cost | 1,515 | 25 | 1,467 | 3.3% |
| 10 | Operations & Maintenance | 2,159 | 52 | 1,552 | 39.1% |
| 13 | Extracurricular Activities | 97 | 38 | 39 | 148.7% |
| 16 | Median Teacher Salary | 61,672 | 42 | 57,437 |
Data from NJDoE 2014 Taxpayers' Guide to Education Spending. *Of K-6 districts with any number of students. Lowest spending=1; Highest=59

The Ocean Township School District is a community public school district that serves students in pre-kindergarten through sixth grade from Ocean Township, in Ocean County, in the U.S. state of New Jersey.

As of the 2018–19 school year, the district, comprised of two schools, had an enrollment of 510 students and 53.6 classroom teachers (on an FTE basis), for a student–teacher ratio of 9.5:1.

The district is classified by the New Jersey Department of Education as being in District Factor Group "CD", the sixth-highest of eight groupings. District Factor Groups organize districts statewide to allow comparison by common socioeconomic characteristics of the local districts. From lowest socioeconomic status to highest, the categories are A, B, CD, DE, FG, GH, I and J.

For seventh through twelfth grades, public school students attend the schools of the Southern Regional School District, which serves the five municipalities in the Long Beach Island Consolidated School District — Barnegat Light, Harvey Cedars, Long Beach Township, Ship Bottom and Surf City — along with students from Beach Haven and Stafford Township, together with the students from Ocean Township who attend as part of a sending/receiving relationship. Schools in the district (with 2018–19 enrollment data from the National Center for Education Statistics) are Southern Regional Middle School with 934 students in grades 7–8 and Southern Regional High School with 1,952 students in grades 9–12. Both schools are in the Manahawkin section of Stafford Township.

== Schools ==
Schools in the district (with 2018–19 enrollment data from the National Center for Education Statistics) are:

- Waretown Elementary School with an enrollment of 309 students in pre-K to 3rd grade
  - Ariane Phillips, principal
- Frederic A. Priff Elementary School with 198 students in grades 4 - 6
  - Sarah Reinhold, principal

== Administration ==
Core members of the district's administration are:

- Christopher S. Lommerin, superintendent
- Steven Terhune, business administrator and board secretary

== Board of education ==
The district's board of education, comprised of nine members, sets policy and oversees the fiscal and educational operation of the district through its administration. As a Type II school district, the board's trustees are elected directly by voters to serve three-year terms of office on a staggered basis, with three seats up for election each year held (since 2012) as part of the November general election. The board appoints a superintendent to oversee the district's day-to-day operations and a business administrator to supervise the business functions of the district.
