= Central Regional School District =

School district in Ocean County, New Jersey, US

Address
- 509 Forest Hills Parkway Bayville, Ocean County, New Jersey, 08721; United States
- Coordinates: 39.893°N 74.2006°W

District information
- Grades: 7-12
- Established: September 1954
- Superintendent: Michelle CarneyRay-Yoder
- Business administrator: Kevin O'Shea
- Schools: 2

Students and staff
- Enrollment: 2,285 (as of 2023–24)
- Faculty: 187.4 FTEs
- Student–teacher ratio: 12.2:1

Other information
- District Factor Group: B
- Website: www.wearecrsd.com
| Ind. | Per pupil | District spending | Rank (*) | 7-12 average | %± vs. average |
|---|---|---|---|---|---|
| 1A | Total Spending | $19,830 | 18 | $18,891 | 5.0% |
| 1 | Budgetary Cost | 14,220 | 12 | 14,586 | −2.5% |
| 2 | Classroom Instruction | 7,967 | 13 | 8,339 | −4.5% |
| 6 | Support Services | 1,969 | 14 | 2,114 | −6.9% |
| 8 | Administrative Cost | 1,575 | 17 | 1,561 | 0.9% |
| 10 | Operations & Maintenance | 1,711 | 13 | 1,798 | −4.8% |
| 13 | Extracurricular Activities | 807 | 19 | 673 | 19.9% |
| 16 | Median Teacher Salary | 67,101 | 22 | 65,769 |
Data from NJDoE 2014 Taxpayers' Guide to Education Spending. *Of 7-12 districts with any number of students. Lowest spending=1; Highest=47

The Central Regional School District is a regional public school district in Ocean County, in the U.S. state of New Jersey, which serves students in seventh through twelfth grades from the municipalities of Berkeley Township, Island Heights, Ocean Gate, Seaside Heights and Seaside Park.

As of the 2023–24 school year, the district, comprised of two schools, had an enrollment of 2,285 students and 187.4 classroom teachers (on an FTE basis), for a student–teacher ratio of 12.2:1.

The district participates in the Interdistrict Public School Choice Program, which allows non-resident students to attend school in the district at no cost to their parents, with tuition covered by the resident district. Available slots are announced annually by grade.

== History ==
The district was established in September 1954 with Berkeley Township, Island Heights, Lacey Township, Ocean Gate, Seaside Heights and Seaside Park as the constituent municipalities.

Students from the six constituent municipalities had previously attended the Toms River Regional Schools, before the new district completed its school building that was constructed on a site covering 87 acres (35 ha) at a cost of $1,430,000 (equivalent to $17.2 million in 2025). The school opened to students in September 1956 as Central Regional Junior-Senior High School with students from the six constituent municipalities, along with students from Brick Township, who attended as part of a sending/receiving relationship. The formal dedication was deferred to late February 1957 due to construction delays.

With the withdrawal of grades 7 and 8 starting in the 1980–81 school year and the opening of Lacey Township High School in 1981, Lacey Township began dissolving its participation in the Central Regional district.

14-year-old female student Adriana Kuch committed suicide in February 2023 after videos of her being physically attacked in a hallway of the school surfaced online. Her father believes that public humiliation and continued online bullying after this event spurred his daughter to end her own life. Later that month, Superintendent Triantafillos Parlapanides resigned after it was reveled that he had disclosed private information about the student to a UK newspaper; the district named Douglas Corbett, an assistant superintendent and former principal, as acting superintendent.

The district had been classified by the New Jersey Department of Education as being in District Factor Group "B", the second-lowest of eight groupings. District Factor Groups organize districts statewide to allow comparison by common socioeconomic characteristics of the local districts. From lowest socioeconomic status to highest, the categories are A, B, CD, DE, FG, GH, I and J.

== Schools ==
Schools in the district (with 2023–24 enrollment data from the National Center for Education Statistics) are:

- Central Regional Middle School with 707 students in grades 7 and 8
  - Joseph F. Firetto, principal
- Central Regional High School with 1,563 students in grades 9 - 12
  - Angello Mazzuca, principal

== Administration ==
Core members of the district's administration are:

- Michelle CarneyRay-Yoder, superintendent
- Kevin O'Shea, business administrator and board secretary

== Board of education ==
The district's board of education, comprised of nine members, sets policy and oversees the fiscal and educational operation of the district through its administration. As a Type II school district, the board's trustees are elected directly by voters to serve three-year terms of office on a staggered basis, with three seats up for election each year held (since 2012) as part of the November general election. The board appoints a superintendent to oversee the district's day-to-day operations and a business administrator to supervise the business functions of the district.
