= Lily McBeth =

American activist

Lily B. McBeth
- Born: August 20, 1934
- Died: September 24, 2014 (aged 80)
- Occupation: Substitute teacher
- Known for: transgender activism

Lily B. McBeth (August 20, 1934 – September 24, 2014) was an American transgender teacher from Tuckerton, New Jersey. A substitute teacher, McBeth underwent gender affirming surgery in 2005. Her actions were hailed as a model of tolerance and acceptance of transgender Americans. She had three grown children from a previous marriage of 33 years. She was a retired medical sales and marketing executive. She was an active surfer, sailor, skier and duck hunter. As a soldier, she served in the U.S. Army as a Senior Medical Corpsman with a tour duty in Alaska. She said that she had always perceived herself as female and identified with other women. She said that for many years, she was afraid to address her gender identity and felt that her first priority was keeping her family together for the sake of her children..

McBeth worked as a substitute teacher at Little Egg Harbor Township School District, Pinelands Regional School District and Eagleswood Elementary School District for five years prior to her transition and returned after completing surgery to resume her teaching career. Some in the community did not think she should have been allowed to return to teaching. One parent took out a full-page advertisement in a local newspaper alerting parents to what had happened. Parents expressed fear that some of her students would not understand transgender identity. After listening to parents and citizens providing public input, the school district board decided to uphold their previous 4 to 1 vote for her reinstatement. This decision was hailed and criticized by politicians, journalists, and activists around the world. While she continued working as a substitute in Eagleswood School District she reapplied and was put on the substitute teachers list in the Pinelands Regional School in Little Egg Harbor Township, New Jersey, in fall 2006. The School Board appointed her to this position after a meeting at which they heard no negative comments; the vote to accept her was unanimous, with one member abstaining.

In 2009, McBeth retired from substituting, claiming that she had received fewer substituting assignments, which she attributed to being a trans woman. She was involved in local theater productions, church choir, and volunteering to re-establish clam colonies in Barnegat Bay.

McBeth died on September 24, 2014, at the age of 80.
