= Toms River Regional Schools =

School district in Ocean County, New Jersey, US

Address
- 1144 Hooper Avenue Toms River, Ocean County, New Jersey, 08753; United States
- Coordinates: 39.976587°N 74.183212°W

District information
- Grades: K-12
- Superintendent: Micheal Citta
- Schools: 18

Students and staff
- Enrollment: 14,654 (as of 2023–24)
- Faculty: 1,078.7 FTEs
- Student–teacher ratio: 13.6:1

Other information
- District Factor Group: DE
- Website: www.trschools.com
| Ind. | Per pupil | District spending | Rank (*) | K-12 average | %± vs. average |
|---|---|---|---|---|---|
| 1A | Total Spending | $14,549 | 2 | $18,891 | −23.0% |
| 1 | Budgetary Cost | 11,626 | 5 | 14,783 | −21.4% |
| 2 | Classroom Instruction | 7,120 | 4 | 8,763 | −18.7% |
| 6 | Support Services | 1,479 | 7 | 2,392 | −38.2% |
| 8 | Administrative Cost | 1,051 | 3 | 1,485 | −29.2% |
| 10 | Operations & Maintenance | 1,354 | 19 | 1,783 | −24.1% |
| 13 | Extracurricular Activities | 335 | 87 | 268 | 25.0% |
| 16 | Median Teacher Salary | 58,000 | 16 | 64,043 |
Data from NJDoE 2014 Taxpayers' Guide to Education Spending. *Of K-12 districts with more than 3,500 students. Lowest spending=1; Highest=103

Toms River Regional Schools is a comprehensive regional public school district primarily located in the quickly growing coastal community of Toms River, located in Ocean County, in the U.S. state of New Jersey, along the state's Jersey Shore. The district includes Toms River and the adjoining boroughs of Beachwood, Pine Beach and South Toms River. In the 2020–21 school year it was the second-largest suburban school district in the state, and the sixth-largest school district in New Jersey (after Newark, Elizabeth, Jersey City, Paterson and Edison). It is also the largest school district in the state that is not an Abbott District.

As of the 2023–24 school year, the district, comprised of 18 schools, had an enrollment of 14,654 students and 1,078.7 classroom teachers (on an FTE basis), for a student–teacher ratio of 13.6:1.

The district has three high schools -- Toms River High School South, Toms River High School North, and Toms River High School East—as well as three middle schools—Toms River Intermediate School East, Toms River Intermediate School North (formerly Intermediate West), and Toms River Intermediate School South.

To raise money for the schools, the district created Toms River Fest, a major festival held during the summer in 2005, 2006 and 2008.

== History ==
In previous eras, the district segregated students by race. In 1948 the district had a separate elementary school for black students. Journal of Negro Education stated the school was "very crude and is situated out in the woods."

When Central Regional High School opened in September 1956, sending/receiving relationships under which students from Berkeley Township, Island Heights, Lacey Township, Ocean Gate, Seaside Heights and Seaside Park attended the district's schools for grades 7-12 were ended. The Toms River district had announced that it could no longer accommodate students from these six municipalities after that date.

Constructed at a cost of $3.9 million (equivalent to $33.8 million in 2025), Toms River High School North opened in 1969 in order to alleviate overcrowding in the original high school (which was renamed as Toms River High School South), which was found to be too small to accommodate the fast-growing community. When the school opened it served students living north of Route 37, while those living south of that line would attend Toms River South, including those from the constituent districts of Beachwood, Pine Beach and South Toms River. The first class to graduate wasn't until 1971, since all of the seniors were kept at TRHSS for the class of 1970.

By 1974, the district was facing split sessions for students, as the district's first and second high schools, Toms River High School South and Toms River High School North, had a total of 4,600 students, nearly 50% above capacity. To address the overcrowding, a March 1975 bond referendum was proposed to raise $15 million—the largest ever in county history—for construction of a third high school, which was rejected by a margin of nearly a 1,000 votes. Toms River High School East opened in September 1979 on a 79-acre (32 ha) site in a building constructed at a cost of $10.9 million (equivalent to $48.4 million in 2025). Opened at a time of rising energy prices, the building was designed so that each classroom had only two windows in order to reduce heat loss through the glass.

With the opening of Intermediate South in September 2005, constructed at a cost of $27 million, all sixth grade classes were shifted from the district's 12 elementary schools to the three middle schools in order to alleviate overcrowding. Also at that time, Intermediate West was renamed Intermediate North.

After the Seaside Park School District closed in 2010, a sending / receiving relationship was established to allow students in grades K-6 from Seaside Park to attend the Toms River Schools. In 2017, the Appellate Division affirmed a decision by the New Jersey Department of Education allowing students from Seaside Park the option of attending school for grades K-6 in either Toms River or in the Lavallette School District, under the terms of a dual sending/receiving relationship. The Lavallette district had actively supported the proposal when the original petition was submitted in 2015 and the Appellate Division rejected the objections raised by the Toms River district, noting that no protest had been made when Seaside Park had submitted its original petition.

The district had been classified by the New Jersey Department of Education as being in District Factor Group "DE", the fifth-highest of eight groupings. District Factor Groups organize districts statewide to allow comparison by common socioeconomic characteristics of the local districts. From lowest socioeconomic status to highest, the categories are A, B, CD, DE, FG, GH, I and J.

In 2018, the district had received requests to change what were perceived as a racially insensitive mascot depicting Native Americans, particularly the Toms River High School South Indians, whose logo depicts a Native American in a headdress, while supporters of retaining the name say that it honors Native Americans.

Facing a loss of state aid and demands from the New Jersey Department of Education that the district must approve a budget for the 2025–26 school year, the district announced in July 2025 that it would file for bankruptcy. Ignoring the bankruptcy threat, the state took over the district's budgeting process for the second consecutive year and imposed a 13% increase for the school year.

== Awards and recognition ==
- The Toms River Regional School District ranked first in Ocean County and second in the state for the lowest per pupil cost for the 2006-2007 fiscal year, according to the New Jersey Department of Education's Comparative Spending Guide.
- For the 2005–06 school year, the district was recognized with the "Best Practices Award" by the New Jersey Department of Education for its "Career Day" Career Education program at East Dover Elementary School.
- For the 1993–94 school year, Toms River Alternate School - High School South was named as a "Star School" by the New Jersey Department of Education, the highest honor that a New Jersey school can achieve.

== Schools ==
Schools in the district (with 2023–24 enrollment data from the National Center for Education Statistics) are:

Elementary schools

- Beachwood Elementary School (with 481 students; in grades K–5)
  - Kimberly Sierotowicz, principal
- Cedar Grove Elementary School (957; PreK–5)
  - Stacey Monetti, principal
- Joseph A. Citta Elementary School (522; K–5)
  - Michael Pallen, principal
- East Dover Elementary School (601; PreK–5)
  - Matthew Gray, principal
- Hooper Avenue Elementary School (697; K–5)
  - Jason Hughes, principal
- North Dover Elementary School (386; K–5)
  - Colleen McGrath, principal
- Pine Beach Elementary School (384; K–5)
  - Tricia Moran, principal
- Silver Bay Elementary School (604; PreK–5)
  - Courtney Norcross, principal
- South Toms River Elementary School (310; K–5)
  - Dennis Holzapfel, principal
- Walnut Street Elementary School (718; K–5)
  - Richard DeMarco, principal
- Washington Street Elementary School (337; K–5)
  - Anna Kasper, principal
- West Dover Elementary School (409; K–5)
  - Shannon Brown, principal

Intermediate schools

- Toms River Intermediate East (1,278; 6–8)
  - James Cleveland principal
- Toms River Intermediate North (932; 6–8)
  - Lynn Fronzak, principal
- Toms River Intermediate South (1,095; 6–8)
  - Paul Gluck, principal

High schools

- Toms River High School East (1,444; 9–12)
  - Erin Anders, principal
- Toms River High School North (1,962; 9–12)
  - Ed Keller, principal
- Toms River High School South (1,371; 9–12)
  - Kevin Raylman, principal

== Administration ==
Core members of the district's administration are:

- Michael S. Citta, superintendent
- William J. Doering, business administrator and board secretary

Frank J. Roselli assumed the role of interim superintendent of schools on October 21, 2010, following the sudden retirement of longtime superintendent Michael J. Ritacco, who earlier that day surrendered to the FBI and was charged in an 18-count fraud indictment. Ritacco was accused and ultimately convicted of accepting between one and two million dollars in bribes from the school district's insurance broker. Roselli was appointed superintendent on January 18, 2011.

In the spring of 2013, after suffering a heart attack, Roselli announced his retirement. Thomas Gialanella was appointed interim superintendent, effective July 1, 2013, and Marianne Gaffney was appointed interim assistant superintendent, replacing Joseph Pizza as of August 1, 2013. Subsequently, due to Gialanella's inability to start on July 1, James Hauenstein was named interim superintendent for the month of July 2013.

David Healy took over as permanent superintendent on July 1, 2014, after being named by the board on March 11, 2014. Healy had been superintendent in the Matawan-Aberdeen Regional School District.

Michael S. Citta, who was Principal of Toms River High School South, was named as superintendent in February 2022.

== Board of education ==
The district's board of education, composed of nine members, sets policy and oversees the fiscal and educational operation of the district through its administration. As a Type II school district, the board's trustees are elected directly by voters to serve three-year terms of office on a staggered basis, with three seats up for election each year held (since 2012) as part of the November general election. The board appoints a superintendent to oversee the district's day-to-day operations and a business administrator to supervise the business functions of the district. Seats on the district's board of education are allocated based on the population of the constituent municipalities, with six seats assigned to Toms River and the other three municipalities—Beachwood, Pine Beach and South Toms River—each assigned one seat.

== District facilities ==
The Bennett Indoor Athletic Complex is an air-supported structure that provides an indoor venue for athletics to the Toms River Regional Schools. It is part of the Bennett Complex, which also features outdoor facilities. The Bennett Complex is located between Hooper Elementary and Toms River Intermediate East at 1519 Hooper Avenue in Toms River. It is named after long time Superintendent John Bennett, who served the district from 1960 to 1977. Amongst other events, the Bennett Complex has hosted the track meet component of the NJSIAA Tournament of Champions in 2007, 2008, 2009, 2010, 2011, 2012 (for indoor athletics only), 2013, and 2014. The Indoor Athletic Complex is also known as The Bubble, and is home to many New Jersey State indoor athletic meets (including state championships). The Indoor Complex features a 200-meter six-lane track with and eight-lane straightaway, a FinishLynx electronic timing system, and accommodates field events such as shot put, high jump, pole vault, long jump, and triple jump. The Indoor Complex was first installed for the 2005–2006 school year. The Indoor Complex was damaged by Hurricane Sandy, but was repaired and reopened in January 2013.

The RWJBarnabas Health Arena is a public arena connected to High School North, opened in 2003. There have been many sponsorships and name changes since its induction, including the Ritacco Center, the Poland Spring Arena and the Pine Belt Arena. The 3,500-seat facility received its current name, the RWJBarnabas Health Arena, under the terms of a five-year deal reached in December 2017 under which the district will be paid $600,000 for the naming rights. The facility is used for school assemblies, pep rallies and gym classes, and for the graduation ceremonies for the district's high schools and middle schools. It is also used for the High School North Mariner's girls and boys' basketball teams.
