= Point Pleasant Beach School District =

School district in Ocean County, New Jersey, US

Address
- 299 Cooks Lane Point Pleasant Beach, Ocean County, New Jersey, 08742; United States
- Coordinates: 40.081331°N 74.061354°W

District information
- Grades: PreK to 12
- Superintendent: William T. Smith
- Business administrator: Brian F. Savage
- Schools: 2

Students and staff
- Enrollment: 646 (as of 2023–24)
- Faculty: 75.0 FTEs
- Student–teacher ratio: 8.6:1

Other information
- District Factor Group: FG
- Website: www.ptbeach.com
Ind.	Per pupil	District spending	Rank (*)	K-12 average	%± vs. average
1A	Total Spending	$19,475	34	$18,891	3.1%
1	Budgetary Cost	15,972	40	14,783	8.0%
2	Classroom Instruction	9,026	38	8,763	3.0%
6	Support Services	2,256	34	2,392	−5.7%
8	Administrative Cost	1,474	10	1,485	−0.7%
10	Operations & Maintenance	2,102	45	1,783	17.9%
13	Extracurricular Activities	1,071	49	268	299.6%
16	Median Teacher Salary	63,980	33	64,043
Data from NJDoE 2014 Taxpayers' Guide to Education Spending. *Of K-12 districts with up to 1,800 students. Lowest spending=1; Highest=49

The Point Pleasant Beach School District is a comprehensive community public school district that serves students in pre-kindergarten through twelfth grade from Point Pleasant Beach, in Ocean County, in the U.S. state of New Jersey.

As of the 2023–24 school year, the district, comprised of two schools, had an enrollment of 646 students and 75.0 classroom teachers (on an FTE basis), for a student–teacher ratio of 8.6:1.

The district had been classified by the New Jersey Department of Education as being in District Factor Group "FG", the fourth-highest of eight groupings. District Factor Groups organize districts statewide to allow comparison by common socioeconomic characteristics of the local districts. From lowest socioeconomic status to highest, the categories are A, B, CD, DE, FG, GH, I and J.

In addition to the students of Point Pleasant Beach the district serves the students of Bay Head and Lavallette for grades 9–12 and those from Mantoloking for K-12, as part of sending/receiving relationships.

== Schools ==
Schools in the district (with 2023–24 enrollment data from the National Center for Education Statistics) are:

Elementary school

- G. Harold Antrim Elementary School 310 students in grades PreK–8
  - Tara Weber, principal

High School

- Point Pleasant Beach High School 326 students in grades 9–12
  - Nathan Grosshandler, principal

== Administration ==
Core members of the district's administration are:

- William T. Smith, superintendent
- Brian F. Savage, business administrator and board secretary

== Board of education ==
The district's board of education, comprised of five members, sets policy and oversees the fiscal and educational operation of the district through its administration. As a Type II school district, the board's trustees are elected directly by voters to serve three-year terms of office on a staggered basis, with either one or two seats up for election each year held (since 2012) as part of the November general election. The board appoints a superintendent to oversee the district's day-to-day operations and a business administrator to supervise the business functions of the district. An additional board trustee is appointed to represent Lavallette.
