= Interdistrict Public School Choice Program =

New Jersey educational program

The Interdistrict Public School Choice Program is a program designed to expand educational choices for New Jersey students by providing them with the option of attending a school district outside their district of residence without cost to their parents and paid for by the state of New Jersey. Districts must apply to participate and must designate open seats by grade where they will accept non-resident students. Each year the New Jersey Department of Education selects the choice districts from those districts that have submitted an application. For 2023-24 there will be 122 participating districts.

== Participating school districts ==
Atlantic County

- Folsom Borough School District at Folsom Elementary School

Bergen County

- Englewood Public School District at Dwight Morrow High School

Burlington County

- Washington Township School District at Green Bank Elementary School

Camden County

- Brooklawn Public School District

Cape May County

- Lower Township School District

Cumberland County

- Cumberland Regional High School

Gloucester County

- South Harrison Township School District

Hudson County

- Hoboken Public Schools

Hunterdon County

- Bloomsbury School District

Monmouth County

- Upper Freehold Regional School District at Allentown High School

Morris County

- Mine Hill School District

Ocean County

- Stafford Township School District

Passaic County

- Manchester Regional High School

Salem County

- Salem City School District

Union County

- David Brearley High School, as part of the Kenilworth Public Schools
