= Ocean County, New Jersey =

County in New Jersey, United States

- County
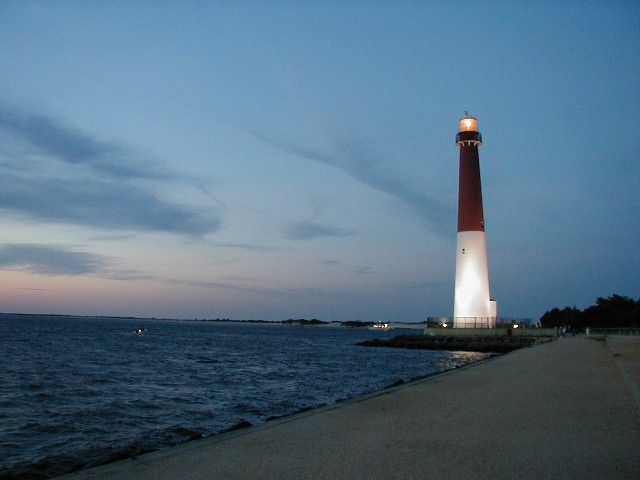
- Sunrise at Barnegat Lighthouse on Long Beach Island, facing the Atlantic Ocean

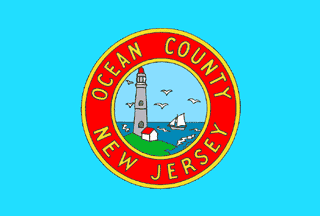
- Flag Seal

- Location within the U.S. state of New Jersey
- Interactive map of Ocean County, New Jersey
- Coordinates: 39.87°N 74.25°W
- Country: United States
- State: New Jersey
- Founded: 1850
- Named for: Atlantic Ocean
- Seat: Toms River
- Largest municipality: Lakewood Township (population); Jackson Township (area)

Government
  - Commissioner Director: John P. Kelly (R, term ends December 31, 2025)

Area
  - Total: 914.84 sq mi (2,369.4 km^{2})
  - Land: 628.29 sq mi (1,627.3 km^{2})
  - Water: 286.55 sq mi (742.2 km^{2}) 31.3%

Population (2020)
  - Total: 637,229
  - Estimate (2025): 673,746 ▲
  - Density: 1,014.2/sq mi (391.60/km^{2})
- Time zone: UTC−5 (Eastern)
  - Summer (DST): UTC−4 (EDT)
- Congressional districts: 2nd, 4th
- Website: co.ocean.nj.us

Ocean County is a county in the U.S. state of New Jersey, and the southernmost county in the New York metropolitan area. The county borders the Atlantic Ocean on the east and in terms of total area is the state's largest county. Its county seat is Toms River. The county is part of the Jersey Shore region of the state.

Since 2020, Ocean County has been the fastest-growing county in New Jersey, with a population of 637,229 recorded at the 2020 United States census, its highest decennial count ever and ranking the county as the state's sixth-most populous county, with an increase of 60,662 (+10.5%) from the 576,567 enumerated at the 2010 census, which in turn reflected an increase of 65,651 (+12.8%) from the 510,916 counted in the 2000 census. Since 2010, Ocean County's population has been growing faster than the United States as a whole. The United States Census Bureau's Population Estimates Program estimated a 2025 population of 673,746, an increase of 36,517 (+5.7%) from the 2020 decennial census. Ocean County’s most populous and fastest-growing place is Lakewood Township, with an estimated 139,866 residents as of 2023, while Jackson Township covers 100.62 square miles (260.6 km^{2}), the largest total area of any municipality in the county.

Ocean County is located 50 miles (80 km) east of Philadelphia, 70 miles (110 km) south of New York City, and 25 miles (40 km) north of Atlantic City, making it a prime vacation destination for residents of these cities during the summer. As with the entire Jersey Shore, summer traffic routinely clogs local roadways throughout the season. Over 31% of Ocean County's total area is water.

Ocean County is part of the New York metropolitan area. The county is also home to many tourist attractions frequented by Philadelphia metropolitan area residents, including the beachfront communities of Seaside Heights, Long Beach Island, and Point Pleasant Beach, and Six Flags Great Adventure, an amusement park in Jackson Township that was the home to the world's tallest and second-fastest roller coaster, Kingda Ka. Ocean County is a gateway to New Jersey's Pine Barrens, one of the largest protected land areas on the East Coast.

== History ==
Paleo-Indians migrated to what is now Ocean County around 11,500 BC. They were a skilled tribe that utilized the natural elements of the area, and they set the “foundation for the area’s rich cultural heritage”.

The Dutch were the first Europeans to settle in the area in the early 17th century, but the British took it over and started exploiting the natural resources of the area.

Toms River, one of the county's oldest communities, was established in 1768.

In 1782, under the command of British Captain Joshua Huddy, Toms River was burned.

Prior to its creation, Ocean County was almost entirely within Shrewsbury Township in Monmouth County, with the exception of Tuckerton and Little Egg Harbor Township. Ocean County was established on February 15, 1850, from portions of Monmouth county; Little Egg Harbor Township was annexed from Burlington County on March 30, 1891. It derives its name from the Atlantic Ocean that it borders.

In the mid 19th century, railroads were built, boosting the economy and tourism to the area.

In 1937, at the Lakehurst military base, the Hindenburg crashed.

Growth in Ocean County accelerated following the opening of the Garden State Parkway in 1954, with many new residents being among those who worked in Northern New Jersey and wanted to live further away from the congestion of the big cities, while still being in commuting distance to their jobs. The Parkway brought increased tourism to the county.

In 1964, Ocean County College opened.

On July 1, 1974, Great Adventure, located in Jackson, opened its doors for the first time.

The most populous municipality in the county is the rapidly growing Lakewood Township with 135,158 residents in 2020, its highest decennial count ever and an increase of 42,315 (+45.6%) from its 2010 census count of 92,843. Jackson Township, which covers 100.62 square miles (260.6 km^{2}), is the largest municipality in Ocean County by area.

== Geography ==
According to the U.S. Census Bureau, as of the 2020 Census, the county had a total area of 914.84 square miles (2,369.4 km^{2}), making it the largest county in New Jersey in terms of total area (ahead of Burlington County), of which 628.29 square miles (1,627.3 km^{2}) was land (68.7%) and 286.55 square miles (742.2 km^{2}) was water (31.3%).

Much of the county is flat and coastal, with an extensive shoreline and many beaches along the Jersey Shore, including Barnegat Light, Beach Haven, Harvey Cedars, Lavallette, Mantoloking, Seaside Heights, Seaside Park, Ship Bottom, and Surf City. The highest point is one of three unnamed hills (one in Jackson Township, the other two in Plumsted Township) that reach at least 230 feet (70 m) in elevation. The lowest elevation in the county is at sea level along the county's lengthy Atlantic Ocean and Barnegat Bay coastlines.

=== Climate ===
Climate data for Jackson Township, New Jersey
Month	Jan	Feb	Mar	Apr	May	Jun	Jul	Aug	Sep	Oct	Nov	Dec	Year
Mean daily maximum °F (°C)	41 (5)	44 (7)	51 (11)	61 (16)	71 (22)	80 (27)	85 (29)	83 (28)	77 (25)	67 (19)	57 (14)	46 (8)	64 (18)
Mean daily minimum °F (°C)	22 (−6)	24 (−4)	30 (−1)	39 (4)	49 (9)	59 (15)	64 (18)	62 (17)	55 (13)	43 (6)	35 (2)	27 (−3)	42 (6)
Average precipitation inches (mm)	3.92 (100)	3.30 (84)	4.79 (122)	4.07 (103)	3.73 (95)	3.80 (97)	4.60 (117)	4.69 (119)	3.79 (96)	3.90 (99)	4.11 (104)	4.51 (115)	49.21 (1,251)

Climate data for Beach Haven Beach, New Jersey (1981–2010 averages)
Month	Jan	Feb	Mar	Apr	May	Jun	Jul	Aug	Sep	Oct	Nov	Dec	Year
Mean daily maximum °F (°C)	40.6 (4.8)	42.5 (5.8)	49.2 (9.6)	57.7 (14.3)	67.9 (19.9)	77.0 (25.0)	82.7 (28.2)	81.6 (27.6)	75.6 (24.2)	65.1 (18.4)	55.1 (12.8)	45.3 (7.4)	61.8 (16.6)
Daily mean °F (°C)	33.4 (0.8)	35.4 (1.9)	41.7 (5.4)	50.5 (10.3)	60.3 (15.7)	69.7 (20.9)	75.4 (24.1)	74.5 (23.6)	68.2 (20.1)	57.1 (13.9)	47.7 (8.7)	38.2 (3.4)	54.4 (12.4)
Mean daily minimum °F (°C)	26.3 (−3.2)	28.2 (−2.1)	34.3 (1.3)	43.2 (6.2)	52.7 (11.5)	62.4 (16.9)	68.2 (20.1)	67.5 (19.7)	60.7 (15.9)	49.0 (9.4)	40.3 (4.6)	31.1 (−0.5)	47.1 (8.4)
Average precipitation inches (mm)	3.21 (82)	3.06 (78)	3.97 (101)	3.40 (86)	2.80 (71)	2.68 (68)	3.80 (97)	4.09 (104)	2.83 (72)	3.44 (87)	2.90 (74)	3.32 (84)	39.50 (1,003)
Average relative humidity (%)	68.1	65.8	64.5	65.3	69.0	72.6	71.9	73.3	72.4	70.2	69.5	68.4	69.3
Average dew point °F (°C)	24.0 (−4.4)	25.1 (−3.8)	30.6 (−0.8)	39.3 (4.1)	50.1 (10.1)	60.5 (15.8)	65.7 (18.7)	65.4 (18.6)	59.0 (15.0)	47.5 (8.6)	38.2 (3.4)	28.7 (−1.8)	44.6 (7.0)
Source: PRISM

Toms River, New Jersey

Climate chart (precipitation, max. and min. temperature)
J	F	M	A	M	J	J	A	S	O	N	D
3.9 41 24	3.3 44 25	4.8 51 32	4.1 61 41	3.7 71 51	3.8 80 61	4.6 85 66	4.7 83 64	3.8 77 58	3.9 67 46	4.1 57 38	4.5 46 29
- █ Average max. and min. temperatures in °F
- █ Precipitation totals in inches
- Source: The Weather Channel
Metric conversion
J	F	M	A	M	J	J	A	S	O	N	D
100 5 −4	84 7 −4	122 11 0	103 16 5	95 22 11	97 27 16	117 29 19	119 28 18	96 25 14	99 19 8	104 14 3	115 8 −2
- █ Average max. and min. temperatures in °C
- █ Precipitation totals in mm

Ocean County's area comprises 31.3% water. The coastal county along the Atlantic Ocean has a humid subtropical climate (Cfa and including the coast). In recent years, average temperatures in the county seat of Toms River have ranged from a low of 24 °F (−4 °C) in January to a high of 85 °F (29 °C) in July, although a record low of −19 °F (−28 °C) was recorded in January 1982 and a record high of 105 °F (41 °C) was recorded in July 1999. Average monthly temperatures in Tuckerton near the south end range from 33.2 °F (0.7 °C) in January to 75.7 °F (24.3 °C) in July.

The highest monthly average temperature for the county was 78.8 °F (26.0 °C) in July 2020; the lowest was 17.2 °F (−8.2 °C) in February 1934.

Average monthly precipitation ranged from 3.30 inches (84 mm) in February to 4.79 inches (122 mm) in March. Areas closer to the coast typically experience more mild winters and cooler summers due to the Atlantic Ocean's influence.

The highest total monthly precipitation recorded for the county was 15.67 in (39.8 cm) in August 2011, the same month Hurricane Irene hit the New Jersey coast; the lowest was .02 in (0.051 cm) recorded in October 2024.

== Demographics ==
Historical population
Census	Pop.	Note	%±
1850	10,032		—
1860	11,176		11.4%
1870	13,628		21.9%
1880	14,455		6.1%
1890	15,974		10.5%
1900	19,747		23.6%
1910	21,318		8.0%
1920	22,155		3.9%
1930	33,069		49.3%
1940	37,706		14.0%
1950	56,622		50.2%
1960	108,241		91.2%
1970	208,470		92.6%
1980	346,038		66.0%
1990	433,203		25.2%
2000	510,916		17.9%
2010	576,567		12.8%
2020	637,229		10.5%
2025 (est.)	673,746		5.7%
Historical sources: 1790–1990 1970–2010; 2010 2000–2010 2020

=== 2020 census ===
As of the 2020 census, the county had a population of 637,229 and 238,812 households, with an average household size of 2.62. The census also reported a population density of 1,014.2 inhabitants per square mile (391.6/km^{2}) and a housing unit density of 470.6 per square mile (181.7/km^{2}).

The median age was 41.5 years; 24.3% of residents were under the age of 18 and 22.7% were 65 years of age or older. For every 100 females there were 93.8 males, and for every 100 females age 18 and over there were 90.4 males.

The racial makeup of the county was 83.8% White, 3.0% Black or African American, 0.4% American Indian and Alaska Native, 1.8% Asian, <0.1% Native Hawaiian and Pacific Islander, 4.4% from some other race, and 6.6% from two or more races. Hispanic or Latino residents of any race comprised 10.4% of the population.

96.3% of residents lived in urban areas, while 3.7% lived in rural areas.

Of the 238,812 households, 27.8% had children under the age of 18 living in them. Of all households, 51.9% were married-couple households, 15.2% were households with a male householder and no spouse or partner present, and 27.2% were households with a female householder and no spouse or partner present. About 28.0% of all households were made up of individuals and 17.0% had someone living alone who was 65 years of age or older.

There were 294,429 housing units, of which 18.9% were vacant. Among occupied housing units, 77.6% were owner-occupied and 22.4% were renter-occupied. The homeowner vacancy rate was 2.0% and the rental vacancy rate was 6.7%.

=== Racial and ethnic composition ===
Ocean County, New Jersey – Racial and ethnic composition Note: the US Census treats Hispanic/Latino as an ethnic category. This table excludes Latinos from the racial categories and assigns them to a separate category. Hispanics/Latinos may be of any race.
Race / Ethnicity (NH = Non-Hispanic)	Pop 1980	Pop 1990	Pop 2000	Pop 2010	Pop 2020	% 1980	% 1990	% 2000	% 2010	% 2020
White alone (NH)	325,934	403,371	459,174	495,534	520,578	94.19%	93.11%	89.87%	85.95%	81.69%
Black or African American alone (NH)	9,166	11,405	14,431	16,583	17,649	2.65%	2.63%	2.82%	2.88%	2.77%
Native American or Alaska Native alone (NH)	391	571	500	454	523	0.11%	0.13%	0.10%	0.08%	0.08%
Asian alone (NH)	1,708	3,707	6,426	9,924	11,339	0.49%	0.86%	1.26%	1.72%	1.78%
Native Hawaiian or Pacific Islander alone (NH)	x	x	75	92	111	x	x	0.01%	0.02%	0.02%
Other race alone (NH)	395	199	392	558	3,899	0.11%	0.05%	0.08%	0.10%	0.61%
Mixed race or Multiracial (NH)	x	x	4,280	5,639	16,801	x	x	0.84%	0.98%	2.64%
Hispanic or Latino (any race)	8,444	13,950	25,638	47,783	66,329	2.44%	3.22%	5.02%	8.29%	10.41%
Total	346,038	433,203	510,916	576,567	637,229	100.00%	100.00%	100.00%	100.00%	100.00%

=== 2010 census ===
The 2010 United States census counted 576,567 people, 221,111 households, and 149,250 families in the county. The population density was 917 inhabitants per square mile (354/km^{2}). There were 278,052 housing units at an average density of 442.2 per square mile (170.7/km^{2}). The racial makeup was 90.98% (524,577) White, 3.15% (18,164) Black or African American, 0.17% (966) Native American, 1.75% (10,081) Asian, 0.02% (129) Pacific Islander, 2.46% (14,165) from other races, and 1.47% (8,485) from two or more races. Hispanic or Latino residents of any race were 8.29% (47,783) of the population.

Of the 221,111 households, 26.7% had children under the age of 18; 53.9% were married couples living together; 9.8% had a female householder with no husband present and 32.5% were non-families. Of all households, 27.8% were made up of individuals and 16.4% had someone living alone who was 65 years of age or older. The average household size was 2.58 and the average family size was 3.16.

23.4% of the population were under the age of 18, 7.5% from 18 to 24, 22.2% from 25 to 44, 25.9% from 45 to 64, and 21% who were 65 years of age or older. The median age was 42.6 years. For every 100 females, the population had 92 males. For every 100 females ages 18 and older there were 88.3 males.

=== 2000 census ===
As of the 2000 United States census there were 510,916 people, 200,402 households, and 137,876 families residing in the county. The population density was 803 inhabitants per square mile (310/km^{2}). There were 248,711 housing units at an average density of 151/km^{2} (390/mi^{2}). The racial makeup of the county was 93.05% White, 2.99% Black or African American, 0.14% Native American, 1.28% Asian, 0.02% Pacific Islander, 1.24% from other races, and 1.29% from two or more races. 5.02% of the population were Hispanic or Latino of any race. Among those who listed their ancestry, 25.3% were of Italian, 23.6% Irish, 18.7% German, 8.8% Polish and 8.5% English ancestry according to Census 2000. There were 200,402 households, out of which 28.10% had children under the age of 18 living with them, 56.40% were married couples living together, 9.20% had a female householder with no husband present, and 31.20% were non-families. 27.00% of all households were made up of individuals, and 16.50% had someone living alone who was 65 years of age or older. The average household size was 2.51 and the average family size was 3.06.

In the county, 23.30% of the population was under the age of 18, 6.60% was from 18 to 24, 26.00% from 25 to 44, 21.90% from 45 to 64, and 22.20% was 65 years of age or older. The median age was 41 years. For every 100 females, there were 90.40 males. For every 100 females age 18 and over, there were 86.40 males. The median income for a household in the county was $46,443, and the median income for a family was $56,420. Males had a median income of $44,822 versus $30,717 for females. The per capita income for the county was $23,054. About 4.8% of families and 7.0% of the population were below the poverty line, including 10.0% of those under age 18 and 5.6% of those age 65 or over.

As of the 2000 Census, Mantoloking was the wealthiest community in the state of New Jersey with a per capita money income of $114,017 as of 1999.

== Economy ==
The Bureau of Economic Analysis calculated that the county's gross domestic product was $23.8 billion in 2022, which ranked 12th of 21 in the state. This was a 4.1% increase from the prior year, the 5th largest percent change in the state. The 2022 GDP numbers reflected the second year in a row of positive growth for the county, after 2020 saw a -0.4% change from 2019.

Ocean County is home to the Ocean County Mall in Toms River, featuring a gross leasable area of 898,000 square feet (83,400 m^{2}). The now-closed Sears site will be replaced with 100,000 square feet (9,300 m^{2}) of retail space.

== Government ==
=== County government ===
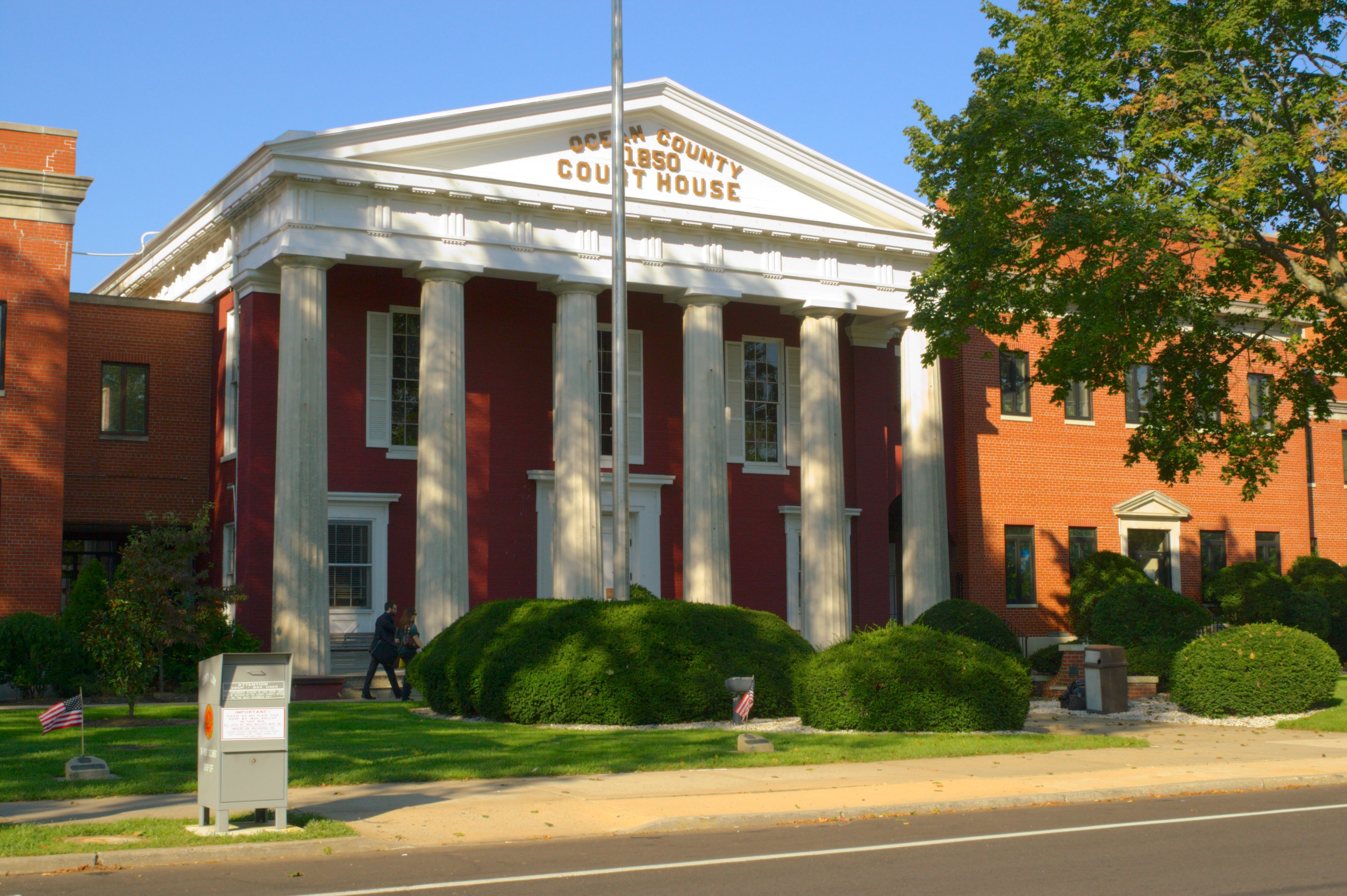
The Ocean County Courthouse in Toms River was built in 1851.

Ocean County is governed by a Board of County Commissioners comprised of five members who are elected on an at-large basis in partisan elections and serving staggered three-year terms of office, with either one or two seats coming up for election each year as part of the November general election. At an annual reorganization held in the beginning of January, the board chooses a Director and a deputy director from among its members. In 2016, freeholders were paid $30,000 and the freeholder director was paid an annual salary of $31,000. This remained unchanged in 2018.

As of 2025, Ocean County's Commissioners are (with terms for chair and vice-chair ending every December 31):

Commissioner	Party, Residence, Term
Robert Arace	R, Manchester Township, 2027
Jennifer Bacchione	R, Berkeley Township, 2027
Virginia E. Haines	R, Toms River, 2025
John P. Kelly	R, Eagleswood Township, 2025
Frank Sadeghi	R, Toms River, 2026

Pursuant to Article VII Section II of the New Jersey State Constitution, each county in New Jersey is required to have three elected administrative officials known as "constitutional officers." These officers are the County Clerk and County Surrogate (both elected for five-year terms of office) and the County Sheriff (elected for a three-year term). Constitutional officers elected on a countywide basis are: Constitutional officers elected on a countywide basis are:

Office	Party, Residence, Term
County Clerk Scott M. Colabella	R, Barnegat Light, 2025
Sheriff Michael G. Mastronardy	R, Toms River, 2025
Surrogate Jeffrey Moran	R, Beachwood, 2028

No Democrat has won a countywide office since 1989. The Ocean County Prosecutor is Bradley D. Billhimer, who was nominated by Governor Phil Murphy. Billhimer was sworn in by New Jersey Attorney General Gurbir Grewal on October 12, 2018. Ocean County constitutes Vicinage 14 of the New Jersey Superior Court and is seated at the Ocean County Courthouse Complex in Toms River; the Assignment Judge for Vicinage 14 is Marlene Lynch Ford. Ocean County operates the Ocean County Southern Service Center in Manahawkin. This center offers access to all of the Ocean County government services without the need for residents to travel to the county seat located about 20 miles (32 km) to the north.

=== Federal representatives ===
The 2nd and 4th Congressional Districts cover the county. For the 119th United States Congress, New Jersey's 2nd congressional district is represented by Jeff Van Drew (R, Dennis Township). For the 119th United States Congress, New Jersey's 4th congressional district is represented by Chris Smith (R, Manchester Township).

=== State representatives ===
The 33 municipalities of Ocean County are covered by four legislative districts.

District	Senate	Assembly	Municipalities
9th	Carmen Amato (R)	Brian E. Rumpf (R) Greg Myhre (R)	Barnegat Township, Barnegat Light, Beach Haven, Beachwood, Berkeley Township, Eagleswood Township, Harvey Cedars, Lacey Township, Lakehurst, Little Egg Harbor Township, Long Beach Township, Manchester Township, Ocean Township, Ocean Gate, Pine Beach, Ship Bottom, Stafford Township, Surf City and Tuckerton.
10th	James W. Holzapfel (R)	Gregory P. McGuckin (R) Paul Kanitra (R)	Bay Head, Brick Township, Island Heights, Lavallette, Mantoloking, Point Pleasant, Point Pleasant Beach, Seaside Park, Seaside Heights, South Toms River, and Toms River Township. The remainder of this district includes portions of Monmouth County.
12th	Owen Henry (R)	Alex Sauickie (R) Robert D. Clifton (R)	Jackson Township and Plumsted Township. The remainder of this district includes portions of Burlington County, Middlesex County & Monmouth County.
30th	Robert Singer (R)	Sean T. Kean (R) Avi Schnall (D)	Lakewood Township. The remainder of this district includes portions of Monmouth County.

== Politics ==
United States presidential election results for Ocean County, New Jersey
Year	Republican		Democratic		Third party(ies)	
Year	No.	%	No.	%	No.	%
1896	3,384	72.59%	1,068	22.91%	210	4.50%
1900	3,182	65.81%	1,413	29.22%	240	4.96%
1904	3,666	65.94%	1,709	30.74%	185	3.33%
1908	3,326	65.15%	1,634	32.01%	145	2.84%
1912	919	18.60%	1,858	37.61%	2,163	43.79%
1916	3,386	61.26%	2,076	37.56%	65	1.18%
1920	6,840	74.84%	2,138	23.39%	161	1.76%
1924	8,677	70.99%	2,594	21.22%	951	7.78%
1928	12,301	73.19%	4,452	26.49%	54	0.32%
1932	10,513	56.95%	7,508	40.67%	439	2.38%
1936	11,293	52.84%	9,889	46.27%	190	0.89%
1940	13,394	60.38%	8,762	39.50%	26	0.12%
1944	13,317	63.32%	7,683	36.53%	32	0.15%
1948	16,740	70.43%	6,366	26.79%	661	2.78%
1952	23,490	72.80%	8,660	26.84%	117	0.36%
1956	28,033	74.80%	9,367	24.99%	79	0.21%
1960	31,430	60.56%	20,113	38.75%	355	0.68%
1964	25,985	40.78%	36,892	57.90%	837	1.31%
1968	41,995	53.87%	26,909	34.52%	9,059	11.62%
1972	77,979	72.43%	27,710	25.74%	1,978	1.84%
1976	77,875	56.93%	56,413	41.24%	2,493	1.82%
1980	98,433	62.47%	46,923	29.78%	12,212	7.75%
1984	124,391	70.23%	51,012	28.80%	1,710	0.97%
1988	124,587	65.38%	64,474	33.83%	1,497	0.79%
1992	95,984	44.39%	75,431	34.88%	44,828	20.73%
1996	82,830	40.81%	94,243	46.43%	25,903	12.76%
2000	105,684	48.84%	102,104	47.18%	8,605	3.98%
2004	154,204	60.13%	99,839	38.93%	2,424	0.95%
2008	160,677	58.43%	110,189	40.07%	4,111	1.50%
2012	146,475	58.16%	102,300	40.62%	3,079	1.22%
2016	179,079	64.71%	87,150	31.49%	10,496	3.79%
2020	217,740	63.76%	119,456	34.98%	4,320	1.26%
2024	227,232	67.40%	105,789	31.38%	4,114	1.22%

In terms of percentage of registered voters, Ocean County is the most Republican county in New Jersey, a state that characteristically votes Democratic. In its history, it has failed to support a Republican for president only three times. The last Democratic presidential candidate to win Ocean County was Bill Clinton in 1996, who carried the county with 46% of the vote. The last Democrat to win a majority in the county was Lyndon Johnson in 1964. The only other time it did not back a Republican was in 1912 when it voted for Theodore Roosevelt's Progressive Party with a plurality of the vote. In 2024, the county's Republican tilt increased in support of Donald Trump, the best such performance since Reagan's 1984 landslide.

As of 2024, all of its state legislators, County commissioners, and countywide constitutional officers are Republicans. As of October 1, 2021, there were a total of 458,230 registered voters in Ocean County, of whom 171,085 (37.3%) were registered as Republicans, 102,005 (22.3%) were registered as Democrats and 179,085 (39.1%) were registered as unaffiliated. There were 6,055 voters (1.3%) registered to other parties. Among the county's 2010 Census population, 63.2% were registered to vote, including 82.6% of those ages 18 and over.

Senate Class 1 election results

United States Senate election results for Ocean County, New Jersey1
Year	Republican		Democratic		Third party(ies)	
Year	No.	%	No.	%	No.	%
2024	197,040	63.66%	109,610	35.41%	2,883	0.93%
2018	141,902	63.29%	75,597	33.72%	6,723	3.00%
2012	132,413	56.11%	99,362	42.10%	4,229	1.79%
2006	92,819	57.24%	64,621	39.85%	4,730	2.92%
2000	115,686	56.35%	82,596	40.23%	7,013	3.42%
1994	76,250	54.61%	59,405	42.54%	3,976	2.85%
1988	98,161	53.21%	84,812	45.97%	1,512	0.82%
1982	67,701	54.76%	55,046	44.53%	878	0.71%

Senate Class 2 election results

United States Senate election results for Ocean County, New Jersey2
Year	Republican		Democratic		Third party(ies)	
Year	No.	%	No.	%	No.	%
2020	207,751	63.09%	116,036	35.24%	5,501	1.67%
2014	79,254	57.44%	55,631	40.32%	3,082	2.23%
2013	68,166	64.38%	36,665	34.63%	1,050	0.99%
2008	139,480	54.98%	109,393	43.12%	4,839	1.91%
2002	80,592	52.59%	69,328	45.24%	3,315	2.16%
1996	92,505	48.16%	91,041	47.40%	8,527	4.44%
1990	76,948	56.08%	54,714	39.88%	5,547	4.04%
1984	75,923	44.13%	94,076	54.69%	2,033	1.18%

=== State elections ===
Governor election results

Gubernatorial election results for Ocean County, New Jersey
Year	Republican		Democratic		Third party(ies)	
Year	No.	%	No.	%	No.	%
2025	185,957	67.03%	90,323	32.56%	1,160	0.42%
2021	145,756	67.54%	68,615	31.79%	1,439	0.67%
2017	98,135	62.11%	56,582	35.81%	3,279	2.08%
2013	125,781	75.76%	37,930	22.85%	2,311	1.39%
2009	124,238	65.73%	53,761	28.44%	11,023	5.83%
2005	93,693	54.19%	71,953	41.62%	7,242	4.19%
2001	77,726	47.12%	84,538	51.25%	2,690	1.63%
1997	84,897	53.76%	57,944	36.69%	15,076	9.55%
1993	87,943	51.44%	78,132	45.70%	4,879	2.85%
1989	62,700	42.09%	83,587	56.12%	2,669	1.79%
1985	90,670	73.67%	30,948	25.15%	1,455	1.18%
1981	78,757	59.48%	52,036	39.30%	1,610	1.22%
1977	45,513	42.27%	59,307	55.09%	2,843	2.64%
1973	32,502	37.17%	53,688	61.41%	1,240	1.42%
1969	48,076	69.10%	20,085	28.87%	1,415	2.03%
1965	28,879	53.58%	23,982	44.49%	1,041	1.93%
1961	24,753	57.14%	18,154	41.90%	416	0.96%
1957	18,185	56.00%	14,247	43.87%	44	0.14%
1953	16,326	63.24%	9,302	36.03%	187	0.72%

== Education ==
=== Tertiary education ===
Ocean County College is the two-year community college for Ocean County, one of a network of 19 county colleges statewide. The school is in Toms River and was founded in 1964.

Georgian Court University in Lakewood Township is a private Roman Catholic Sisters of Mercy college, which opened in 1908 on the former winter estate of millionaire George Jay Gould I, son of railroad tycoon Jay Gould. Lakewood is also home to Beth Medrash Govoha, a Haredi yeshiva with 5,000 students, making it one of the largest yeshivas in the world and the largest outside the State of Israel.

Stockton University has a campus located in Manahawkin offering undergraduate and graduate colleges of the arts, sciences and professional studies of the New Jersey state system of higher education.

=== Primary and secondary schools ===
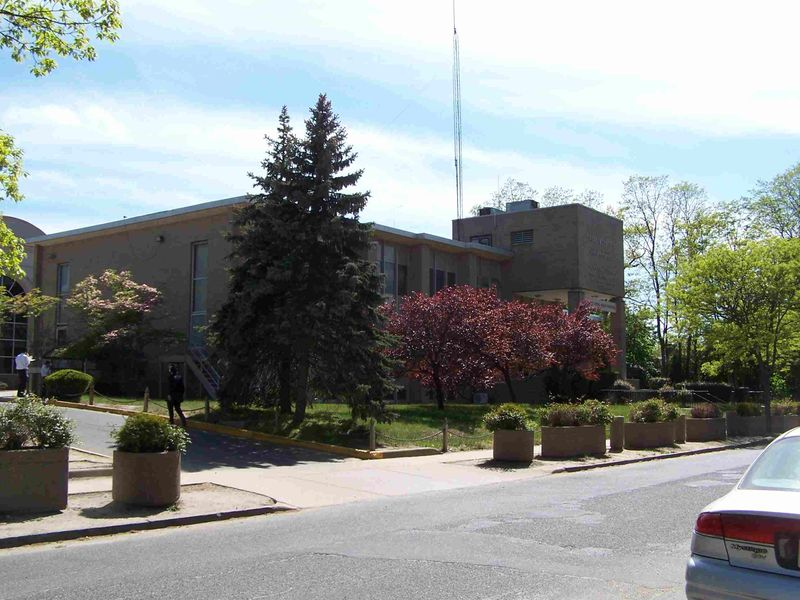
Beth Medrash Govoha in Lakewood is the world's largest yeshiva outside of Israel.

School districts in the county include:

K-12

- Barnegat Township School District
- Brick Public Schools
- Jackson School District
- Lacey Township School District
- Lakewood School District
- Manchester Township School District
- Plumsted Township School District
- Point Pleasant Beach School District
- Point Pleasant School District
- Toms River Regional Schools

Secondary

- Central Regional School District
- Ocean County Vocational Technical School
- Pinelands Regional School District
- Southern Regional School District

Elementary (K-6, except as noted)

- Bay Head School District (K-8)
- Beach Haven School District
- Berkeley Township School District
- Eagleswood Township School District
- Island Heights School District
- Lakehurst School District (K-8)
- Lavallette School District (K-8)
- Little Egg Harbor Township School District
- Long Beach Island Consolidated School District
- Ocean Gate School District
- Ocean Township School District
- Seaside Heights School District
- Seaside Park School District (non-operating)
- Stafford Township School District
- Tuckerton School District

New Jersey's largest suburban school district, Toms River Regional Schools, is located in Ocean County. Toms River is also home to the county's only Roman Catholic high school, Monsignor Donovan High School, operated by the Roman Catholic Diocese of Trenton, which also has six elementary schools located in the county.

In addition to multiple public high schools, the county has an extensive vocational high school program, known as the Ocean County Vocational Technical School district. In addition to its campuses in Brick, Toms River, Waretown, and Jackson, it contains three magnet schools:

- Marine Academy of Technology and Environmental Science (MATES)
- OCVTS Performing Arts Academy – theater, dance, and vocal
- OCVTS Academy of Law and Public Safety (ALPS)

== Attractions ==
Ocean County has an extensive shoreline stretching along the Atlantic Ocean, including the Jersey Shore communities and oceanfront boardwalk resorts of Seaside Heights and Point Pleasant Beach.

Six Flags Great Adventure, America's largest Six Flags theme park, was home to the world's tallest and formerly fastest roller coaster, Kingda Ka, which closed in November 2024. The park also contains Six Flags Hurricane Harbor, New Jersey's largest water park, and the 2,200-acre (890 ha) Safari Off Road Adventure, the largest drive-thru animal safari outside of Africa.

Approximately 40 miles (64 km) of barrier beaches form the Barnegat and Little Egg Harbor Bays, offering ample watersports. It also is home of the Tuckerton Seaport, a 40-acre (160,000 m^{2}) maritime history village in Tuckerton. In addition to being the northeast gateway to New Jersey's Pine Barrens, Ocean County is also home to several state parks:

- Barnegat Lighthouse State Park covers 32 acres (13 ha) surrounding Barnegat Lighthouse at the northern tip of Long Beach Island.
- Island Beach State Park has 3,000 acres (1,200 ha) of coastal dunes.
- Double Trouble State Park includes 8,000 acres (3,200 ha) of land in the New Jersey Pine Barrens.
- Brendan T. Byrne State Forest includes 37,000 acres (15,000 ha) and was formerly known as Lebanon State Forest.
- Forked River State Marina

ShoreTown Ballpark located in Lakewood, opened in 2001 with 6,588 reserved seats and is home of the Jersey Shore BlueClaws, the High-A affiliate of the Philadelphia Phillies.

=== National protected area ===
- Edwin B. Forsythe National Wildlife Refuge covers 48,000 acres (19,000 ha) of wetlands and coastal habitat in Atlantic and Ocean counties.

== Media ==
The Asbury Park Press and The Press of Atlantic City are daily newspapers that cover Ocean County. Micromedia Publications publishes six weekly local newspapers in the county; their seventh covers Howell Township, New Jersey in Monmouth County, New Jersey.

92.7 WOBM provides news, traffic and weather updates. WOBM-FM radio started broadcasting from the Bayville section of Berkeley Township in March 1968. The station relocated to studios in Toms River in 2013.

91.9 WBNJ provides local news, PSAs and events; as well as weather updates.

== Transportation ==
=== Roads and highways ===
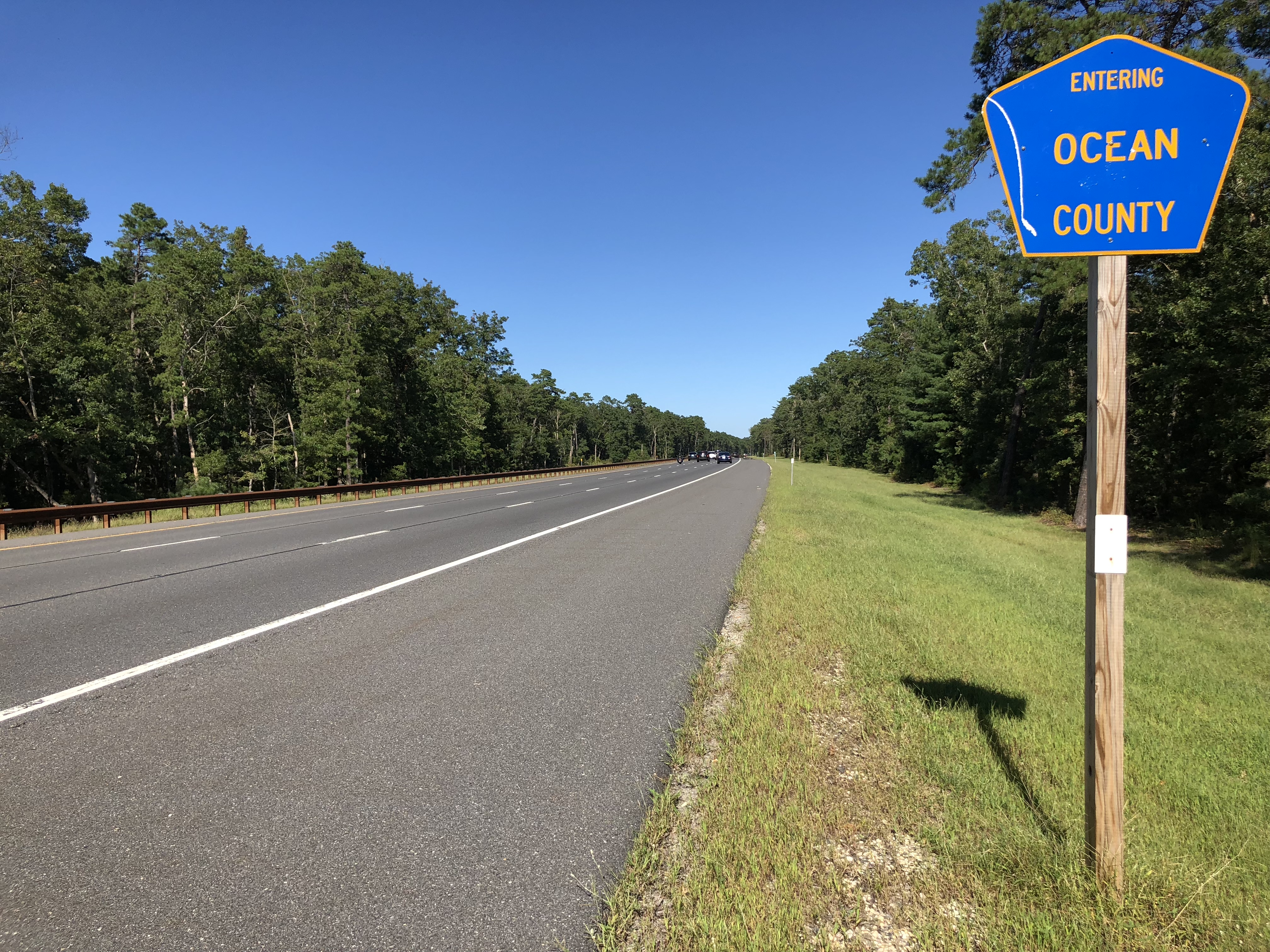
Entering Ocean County on the northbound Garden State Parkway in Little Egg Harbor Township

The county had a total of 2,958.5 miles (4,761.2 km) of roadways, of which 2,164.2 miles (3,482.9 km) are maintained by the municipality, 615.5 miles (990.6 km) by Ocean County and 140.19 miles (225.61 km) by the New Jersey Department of Transportation and 38.59 miles (62.10 km) by the New Jersey Turnpike Authority.

Ocean County has various major roads that pass through. Those routes are listed below:

- U.S. Route 9 (The only U.S. Highway in the county)
- Route 13
- Route 35
- Route 37
- Route 70
- Route 72
- Route 88
- Route 166
- Interstate 195 (The only Interstate to pass through Ocean County; It runs entirely in Jackson Township)
- The Garden State Parkway extends 38.5 miles (62.0 km) from Bass River Township in Burlington County in the south to Wall Township in Monmouth County to the north.

Several prominent 500 series county highways make up an important portion of the automobile corridors in Ocean County. These include County Road 526, County Road 527, County Road 528, County Road 530, County Road 532, County Road 539, County Road 547, County Road 549, County Road 554, and County Road 571.

=== Public transportation ===
==== Train ====
NJ Transit's (NJT) North Jersey Coast Line, which serves New York Penn Station and passes through Middlesex County and Monmouth counties, offers service at the Bay Head and Point Pleasant Beach stations, located at the northernmost corner of the county. The Monmouth Ocean Middlesex Line is a passenger rail project proposed by NJT to serve the northern central part of the county. Southern Ocean County is also located about 25 miles (40 km) from the Atlantic City Line, which provides service to Philadelphia.

==== Bus ====
===== NJ Transit =====
Bus service is provided on NJ Transit bus routes 130, 132, 136, and 139 to and from Lakewood Bus Terminal on the U.S. Route 9 corridor. Expanded use Route 9 BBS (bus bypass shoulder lanes) is under study. Bus route 559 provides service along U.S. Route 9 between Lakewood Township and Pleasantville before continuing to Atlantic City.

Bus route 137 provides service in three variants. One is a nonstop express between Toms River and the Port Authority Bus Terminal in Midtown Manhattan that operates seven days a week. The other two are rush hour only services, one operating along County Route 549 between Toms River and Brick Township before continuing to New York City. The other begins and ends in Lakewood Township, operating via County Line Road to the Brick park and ride before continuing to New York.

Bus route 67 operates between Toms River and Newark, providing service along County Route 549 between Toms River and Brick before continuing onto Lakewood and points north. Bus Route 317 crosses the county in an east–west fashion on its route between Philadelphia and Asbury Park. This route also provides service to Fort Dix, Camden, and other destinations. Bus route 319 makes a single stop in Toms River on its route between Atlantic City and New York.

===== Ocean Ride =====
Ocean Ride is a county wide system with 12 regular routes, many serving Ocean County Mall, which acts as transfer hub. Of these routes, only the OC 10 (Lavallette to Toms River) operates Monday-Saturday, with the OC 4 (Point Pleasant to Lakewood) operating Monday-Friday. All other routes run 2–3 days a week. Ocean Ride also provides paratransit service throughout the county.

===== Other services =====
Academy Bus provides service between various areas in the northern part of the county and New York City. Many of the retirement communities contract for the operation of shuttle buses to connect the communities with various shopping centers in the county.

== Municipalities ==
The 33 municipalities in Ocean County with 2010 census data for population, housing units, and area in square miles are: Other, unincorporated communities in the county are listed alongside their parent municipality (or municipalities). Most of these areas are census-designated places that have been created by the United States Census Bureau for enumeration purposes within a Township. The numbers in parentheses stand for the numbers on the map.

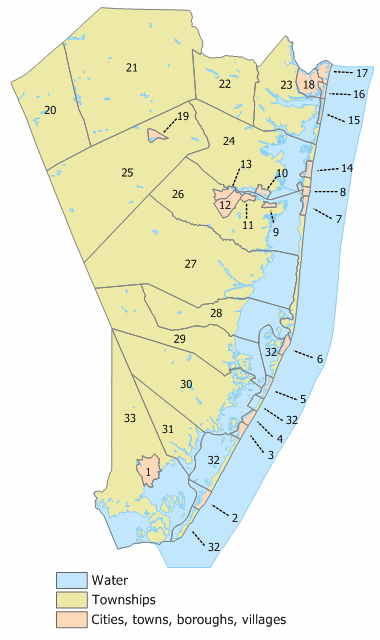
Index map of Ocean County municipalities (see index key in table below)

Interactive map of municipalities in Ocean County.

Municipality (map index)	Map key	Mun. type	Pop.	Housing units	Total area	Water area	Land area	Pop. density	Housing density	School district	Unincorporated communities/notes
Barnegat	29	township	24,296	9,085	40.78	6.41	34.38	609.0	264.35	Barnegat Township	Barnegat CDP (3,894), Howardsville, Ocean Acres (part; 925), Warren Grove
Barnegat Light	6	borough	640	1,282	0.85	0.12	0.73	785.1	1,753.6	Southern Regional (7–12); Long Beach Island (PK-6)	
Bay Head	16	borough	930	1,023	0.70	0.12	0.58	1,662.8	1,757.3	Point Pleasant Beach (9–12) (S/R); Bay Head (K-8)	
Beach Haven	2	borough	1,027	2,667	2.32	1.34	0.98	1,196.0	2,726.2	Southern Regional (7–12); Beach Haven (PK-6)	
Beachwood	12	borough	10,859	3,826	2.85	0.00	2.85	3,878.4	1,343.5	Toms River	
Berkeley Township	26	township	43,754	23,818	56.00	13.13	42.86	962.5	555.7	Central Regional (7–12); Berkeley Township (PK-6)	Bayville (20,512), Cedar Beach, Crossley, Glen Cove, Holiday; City-Berkeley CDP (12,943), Holiday; City South CDP (4,124), Holiday; Heights CDP (2,143), Holly Park, Pelican Island, Silver Ridge CDP (1,167)
Brick	23	township	73,620	33,677	32.32	6.60	25.72	2,919.4	1,309.6	Brick	Adamston, Breton Woods, Burrsville, Cedarcroft, Herbertsville, Laurelton, Osbornsville, Parkway Pines
Eagleswood	31	township	1,722	760	18.86	2.80	16.06	99.8	47.3	Pinelands Regional (7–12); Eagleswood (PK-6)	West Creek
Harvey Cedars	5	borough	391	1,214	1.19	0.63	0.56	604.6	2,178.0	Southern Regional (7–12); Long Beach Island (PK-6)	
Island Heights	10	borough	1,650	831	0.91	0.30	0.61	2,738.3	1,360.2	Central Regional (7–12); Islands Heights (K-6)	
Jackson	21	township	58,544	20,342	100.62	1.38	99.24	552.7	205.0	Jackson	Bennetts Mills, Cassville, Harmony, Holmeson (part; 5,231), Jackson Mills, Prospertown, Vista Center CDP (2,370), Whitesville
Lacey Township	27	township	28,655	11,573	98.53	15.27	83.26	332.0	139.0	Lacey Township	Aserdaten, Barnegat Pines, Forked; River CDP (5,274), Lanoka Harbor
Lakehurst	19	borough	2,636	943	1.01	0.09	0.91	2,900.8	1,030.7	Manchester (9–12) (S/R); Lakehurst (PK-8)	
Lakewood	22	township	135,158	26,337	24.98	0.41	24.58	3,777.7	1,071.6	Lakewood	Lakewood CDP (69,398), Leisure; Village CDP (4,966), Leisure Village; East CDP (4,189)
Lavallette	14	borough	1,787	3,207	0.95	0.15	0.81	2,319.2	3,966.8	Point Pleasant Beach (9–12) (S/R); Lavallette (K-8)	
Little Egg Harbor	33	township	20,784	10,324	73.05	25.69	47.37	423.6	218.0	Pinelands Regional (7–12); Little Egg Harbor (PK-6)	Mystic Island CDP (8,301), Nugentown, Parkertown Warren Grove, West; Tuckerton
Long Beach	32	township	3,153	9,216	22.04	16.59	5.44	560.5	1,693.0	Southern Regional (7–12); Long Beach Island (PK-6)	High Bar Harbor, Loveladies, North; Beach Haven CDP (2,198)
Manchester Township	25	township	45,115	25,886	82.69	1.07	81.62	527.7	317.2	Manchester	Bullock, Cedar Glen Lakes CDP (1,517), Cedar Glen West CDP (1,379), Crestwood; Village CDP (8,426), Leisure Knoll CDP (3,692), Leisure Village West (3,493), Pine Lake; Park CDP (8,913), Pine Ridge at Crestwood CDP (2,537), Ridgeway, Roosevelt City, Wheatland, Whiting
Mantoloking	15	borough	331	535	0.64	0.26	0.39	767.9	1,387.9	Point Pleasant Beach (9–12) (S/R)	
Ocean Gate	9	borough	1,932	1,203	0.45	0.01	0.45	4,490.3	2,686.1	Central Regional (7–12); Ocean Gate (PK-6)	
Ocean Township	28	township	8,835	4,291	32.04	11.49	20.56	405.3	208.8	Southern Regional (7–12) (S/R) (9–12); Ocean Township (PK-6)	Brookville, Waretown CDP (1,483)
Pine Beach	11	borough	2,139	903	0.62	0.00	0.61	3,465.4	1,471.2	Toms River	
Plumsted	20	township	8,072	3,067	40.15	0.44	39.71	212.1	77.2	Plumsted Township	Archertown, Brindletown, New; Egypt CDP (2,357)
Point Pleasant	18	borough	18,941	8,331	4.17	0.68	3.49	5,272.1	2,388.1	Point Pleasant	
Point Pleasant Beach	17	borough	4,766	3,373	1.74	0.32	1.43	3,270.1	2,364.4	Point Pleasant Beach	Clark's Landing
Seaside Heights	8	borough	2,440	3,003	0.75	0.13	0.62	4,662.9	4,850.2	Central Regional (7–12); Seaside Heights (PK-6)	
Seaside Park	7	borough	1,436	2,703	0.77	0.12	0.65	2,429.4	4,158.7	Central Regional (7–12); Lavallette (K-6) (Opt. 1); Toms River (K-6) (Opt. 2)	
Ship Bottom	3	borough	1,098	2,066	1.00	0.29	0.71	1,620.6	2,896.3	Southern Regional (7–12); Long Beach Island (PK-6)	
South Toms River	13	borough	3,643	1,160	1.23	0.06	1.17	3,146.7	990.8	Toms River	
Stafford Township	30	township	28,617	13,604	54.88	9.03	45.85	578.8	296.7	Southern Regional (7–12); Stafford Township (PK-6)	Beach Haven West CDP (4,143), Cedar Run, Manahawkin CDP (2,413), Mayetta, Ocean Acres (part; 15,217), Warren Grove
Surf City	4	borough	1,243	2,566	0.92	0.17	0.75	1,616.5	3,442.4	Southern Regional (7–12); Long Beach Island (PK-6)	
Toms River	24	township	95,438	43,334	52.88	12.40	40.49	2,253.5	1,070.3	Toms River	Cattus Island, Chadwick Beach Island, Dover Beaches North CDP (1,277), Dover Beaches South CDP (1,331), Gilford Park, Pelican Island, Silverton, Toms River CDP (92,830)
Tuckerton	1	borough	3,577	1,902	3.80	0.44	3.36	995.1	565.5	Pinelands Regional (7–12); Tuckerton (PK-6)	
Ocean County		county	637,229	278,052	915.40	286.62	628.78	917.0	442.2		

=== Former municipalities ===
- Island Beach (1933–1965)
- Dover Township (renamed Toms River in 2006)

== See also ==
- National Register of Historic Places listings in Ocean County, New Jersey
