= Southern Regional School District =

School district in Ocean County, New Jersey, US

Address
- 105 Cedar Bridge Road Manahawkin, Ocean County, New Jersey, 08050; United States
- Coordinates: 39.711145°N 74.258617°W

District information
- Grades: 7-12
- Superintendent: Craig Henry
- Business administrator: Steven Terhune
- Schools: 2

Students and staff
- Enrollment: 2,726 (as of 2023–24)
- Faculty: 228.4 FTEs
- Student–teacher ratio: 11.9:1

Other information
- District Factor Group: FG
- Website: www.srsd.net
Ind.	Per pupil	District spending	Rank (*)	7-12 average	%± vs. average
1A	Total Spending	$20,421	23	$18,891	8.1%
1	Budgetary Cost	15,984	22	14,586	9.6%
2	Classroom Instruction	9,670	35	8,339	16.0%
6	Support Services	2,132	19	2,114	0.9%
8	Administrative Cost	1,480	15	1,561	−5.2%
10	Operations & Maintenance	2,117	30	1,798	17.7%
13	Extracurricular Activities	518	4	673	−23.0%
16	Median Teacher Salary	74,949	36	65,769
Data from NJDoE 2014 Taxpayers' Guide to Education Spending. *Of 7-12 districts with any number of students. Lowest spending=1; Highest=47

The Southern Regional School District is a regional public school district in Ocean County, in the U.S. state of New Jersey, serving students in seventh grade through twelfth grade. The district serves the five municipalities in the Long Beach Island Consolidated School District – Barnegat Light, Harvey Cedars, Long Beach Township, Ship Bottom and Surf City – along with students from Beach Haven and Stafford Township. Also attending the district are students from Ocean Township, who attend the school on a tuition basis as part of a sending/receiving relationship with the Ocean Township School District. The student body has grown in with population growth in the area. The high school was forced to add a large addition in the mid-1990s due to overcrowding.

As of the 2023–24 school year, the district, comprised of two schools, had an enrollment of 2,726 students and 228.4 classroom teachers (on an FTE basis), for a student–teacher ratio of 11.9:1.

== History ==
Southern Regional High School opened in 1957 as a junior-senior high school, housing students from Stafford Township, Barnegat, Ocean Township (including its Waretown neighborhood), Tuckerton, Little Egg Harbor, Eagleswood Township, Bass River Township, and all six towns of Long Beach Island. At the time of its founding in 1957, the district had a roughly equal number of students from Long Beach Island and Stafford Township.

Prior to the opening of Southern Regional, students from Barnegat, Waretown, and Long Beach Island attended the former Barnegat High School, while students from Stafford, Eagleswood, Tuckerton, Little Egg Harbor, and Bass River attended the former Tuckerton High School, which currently houses Tuckerton's elementary school.

At first, the school only had two sports; boys' baseball and boys' basketball. Football was added in 1958, and wrestling came two years later. Girls had "Sports Nights" instead of competitive teams. It would not be until the 1960s when women's sports would first appear at Southern. Due to the quick growth of the area, a new wing and expanded gymnasium were added in 1966.

In 1970, Southern Regional Middle School opened its doors to 7th and 8th graders. However, it soon became overcrowded. Starting in 1979, students from Tuckerton, Little Egg Harbor, Bass River, and Eagleswood, would attend the newly opened Pinelands Regional High School in Tuckerton. At the same time, an expansion was built onto the middle school, all ninth graders were moved from the high school to the middle school.

The high school went through several changes throughout the 1990s. In December 1991, maintenance crews installing a heating system sparked a fire that damaged the guidance area and several science labs, which were later remodeled. The school also caught fire two years later after an explosion occurred in the school's main electric panel. While a new wing of classrooms was added to the high school in 1996, a new two-story building was opened in 1998 adjacent to the existing high school, with the old high school building housing ninth and tenth graders known as the "9/10 building". At the same time, the middle school went back to housing the seventh and eighth graders.

In 2004, Barnegat High School opened in Barnegat Township, starting with a freshman class and adding a class each school year. June 2007 marked Southern Regional's last graduating class with students from Barnegat. Barnegat High School became a full 9-12 high school in September 2007, ending its sending relationship. With nearly 80% of the district's tax levy coming from residents of Long Beach Island and its small school-age population, municipal officials in Beach Haven and Long Beach Township have considered studies to analyze a possible withdrawal from the district.

As of 2016, the overwhelming majority of students are from Stafford Township, accounting for nearly 90% of enrollment. These demographic changes have led to significant discrepancies in the cost per pupil sent to the district from each community, with Harvey Cedars and Long Beach Township paying more than $200,000 per pupil, while Stafford Township's costs are $3,600 for each student. These widely different costs result from a formula that uses the taxable property value in each municipality to apportion costs, which means that municipalities with relatively high property values and small numbers of students pay a higher share of total district costs. Some residents of Long Beach Island communities are seeking to amend the formula to take advantage of a 1993 law that allows districts to use both property value and enrollment to allocate property taxes, that that would require passage of referendums in each municipality.

The district had been classified by the New Jersey Department of Education as being in District Factor Group "FG", the fourth-highest of eight groupings. District Factor Groups organize districts statewide to allow comparison by common socioeconomic characteristics of the local districts. From lowest socioeconomic status to highest, the categories are A, B, CD, DE, FG, GH, I and J.

== Curriculum ==
Southern Regional offers over 200 courses from which students can select. The courses are designed to appeal to a wide variety of student interests. Advanced Placement Program (AP) courses are offered in English, history, mathematics, science, art, music, and world languages. Technology-related courses, from the traditional to the highly technical (electronics, graphics and photography lab, computer assisted design, programming, and Internet), focus on problem solving, experimental design, and creativity.

The health and physical education program are electives, based with a strong emphasis on lifelong wellness and making intelligent lifestyle choices. Project Adventure, an outdoor education program, and behind the wheel driver education are also offered. Additionally, Southern Regional has an "Honor Unit" Air Force Junior ROTC program, which concentrates on aerospace science, leadership training, and community service. The special needs of students are addressed as well, through self-contained, resource, adaptive success, and in-class support programs. Mainsail (alternative) and ESL (English as a Second Language) programs are offered for eligible students. In addition to the academic programs, Southern Regional offers students over 70 co-curricular and interscholastic programs.

== Schools ==
Schools in the district (with 2023–24 enrollment data from the National Center for Education Statistics) are:

- Southern Regional Middle School with 849 students in grades 7 and 8
  - Elisabeth Brahn, principal
- Southern Regional High School with 1,865 students in grades 9–12
  - Joe Medica, principal

Both schools in the district are in the Manahawkin of Stafford Township, and are located next to each other, divided by the main road leading into the school zone. Upon entrance into the school zone, Southern's Middle School is located on the left and the high school is located on the right.

== Administration ==
Core members of the district's administration are:

- Craig Henry, superintendent
- Steven Terhune, business administrator and board secretary

Henry was the county's highest-paid superintendent in the 2023–24 school year, with a salary of $247,302, more than 36% above the statewide average pay of $181,037.

== Board of education ==
The district's board of education is comprised of ten members who set policy and oversee the fiscal and educational operation of the district through its administration. As a Type II school district, the board's trustees are elected directly by voters to serve three-year terms of office on a staggered basis, with three seats up for election each year held (since 2012) as part of the November general election. The board appoints a superintendent to oversee the district's day-to-day operations and a business administrator to supervise the business functions of the district.
