= Long Beach Island Consolidated School District =

School district in Ocean County, New Jersey, US

Address
- 200 Barnegat Avenue Surf City, Ocean County, New Jersey, 08008; United States
- Coordinates: 39.658251°N 74.174793°W

District information
- Grades: PreK-6
- Superintendent: Peter J. Kopack
- Business administrator: Christine Kelly
- Schools: 2

Students and staff
- Enrollment: 215 (as of 2020–21)
- Faculty: 30.7 FTEs
- Student–teacher ratio: 7.0:1

Other information
- District Factor Group: FG
- Website: www.lbischools.org
Ind.	Per pupil	District spending	Rank (*)	K-6 average	%± vs. average
1A	Total Spending	$23,943	55	$18,891	26.7%
1	Budgetary Cost	22,754	58	13,649	66.7%
2	Classroom Instruction	12,782	57	8,366	52.8%
6	Support Services	3,986	56	2,161	84.5%
8	Administrative Cost	1,839	44	1,467	25.4%
10	Operations & Maintenance	3,679	59	1,552	137.0%
13	Extracurricular Activities	14	9	39	−64.1%
16	Median Teacher Salary	64,081	50	57,437
Data from NJDoE 2014 Taxpayers' Guide to Education Spending. *Of K-6 districts with any number of students. Lowest spending=1; Highest=59

The Long Beach Island Consolidated School District is a regional consolidated public school district which serves students in pre-kindergarten through sixth grade from five communities bordering the Atlantic Ocean on Long Beach Island, in Ocean County, in the U.S. state of New Jersey. Communities served by the district are Barnegat Light, Harvey Cedars, Long Beach Township, Ship Bottom and Surf City.

As of the 2020–21 school year, the district, comprised of two schools, had an enrollment of 215 students and 30.7 classroom teachers (on an FTE basis), for a student–teacher ratio of 7.0:1.

Students in public school for seventh through twelfth grades attend the Southern Regional School District, which serves the five municipalities in the Long Beach Island Consolidated School District, along with students from Beach Haven and Stafford Township, as well as students from Ocean Township (including its Waretown section) who attend as part of a sending/receiving relationship. Schools in the district (with 2020–21 enrollment data from the National Center for Education Statistics) are Southern Regional Middle School with 902 students in grades 7–8 and Southern Regional High School with 1,975 students in grades 9–12. Both schools are in the Manahawkin section of Stafford Township.

== History ==
The district had been classified by the New Jersey Department of Education as being in District Factor Group "FG", the fourth-highest of eight groupings. District Factor Groups organize districts statewide to allow comparison by common socioeconomic characteristics of the local districts. From lowest socioeconomic status to highest, the categories are A, B, CD, DE, FG, GH, I and J.

As part of an effort to reduce costs associated with multiple aging facilities, the district announced in 2016 that it was considering closing the Long Beach Island Grade School and consolidating all students at Ethel A. Jacobsen Elementary School. The plan would require a $16 million bond to cover the costs of expanding and upgrading Jacobsen School to add two new wings, which would add about $50 per year in property taxes for the average homeowner, excluding any contribution from state aid or revenue from the sale of the old building.

== Schools ==
Schools in the district (with 2020–21 enrollment data from the National Center for Education Statistics) are:

- Ethel Jacobsen School in Surf City with 111 students in pre-kindergarten to second grade
  - Frank Birney, principal
- Long Beach Island Grade School in Ship Bottom with 125 students in grades 3 – 6
  - Peter J. Kopack, principal

== Administration ==
Core members of the district's administration are:

- Peter J. Kopack, superintendent
- Meghan Lee, school business administrator and board secretary

== Board of education ==
The district's board of education is comprised of nine members who set policy and oversee the fiscal and educational operation of the district through its administration. As a Type II school district, the board's trustees are elected directly by voters to serve three-year terms of office on a staggered basis, with three seats up for election each year held (since 2012) as part of the November general election. The board appoints a superintendent to oversee the district's day-to-day operations and a business administrator to supervise the business functions of the district. Of the nine seats, four are allocated to Long Beach Township and two to Surf City, with the other three constituent municipalities each allocated one seat.
