= Ship Bottom, New Jersey =

Borough in Ocean County, New Jersey, US

- Borough
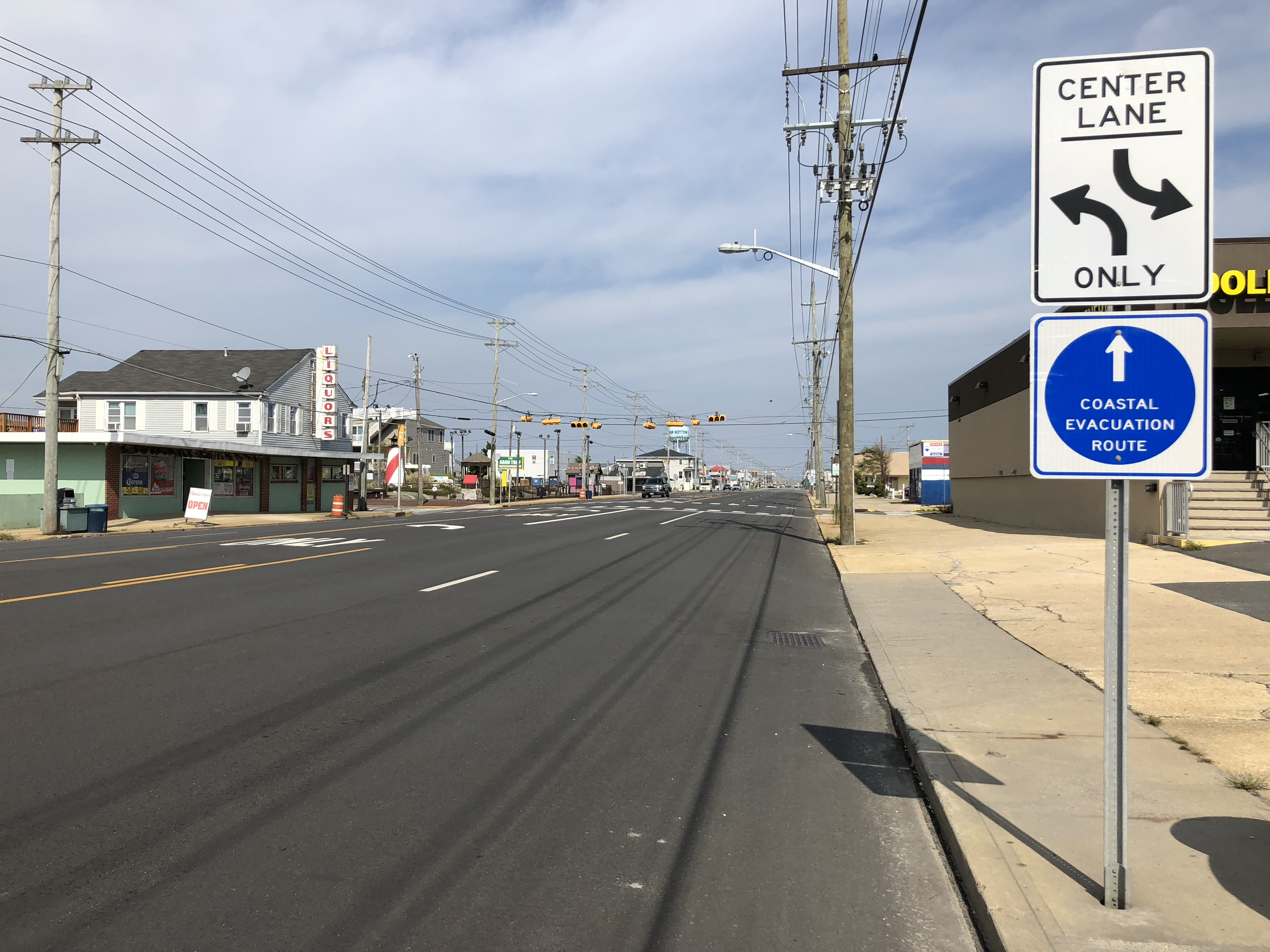
- Long Beach Boulevard in Ship Bottom

- Seal
- Motto: "Gateway to Long Beach Island"
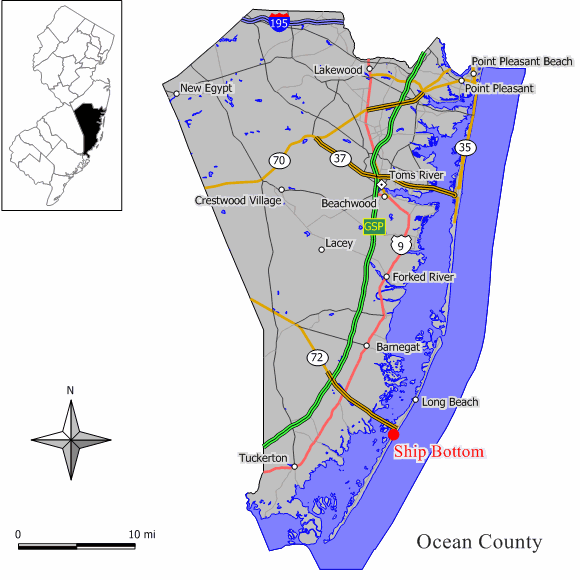
- Map of Ship Bottom in Ocean County. Inset: Location of Ocean County highlighted in the State of New Jersey.

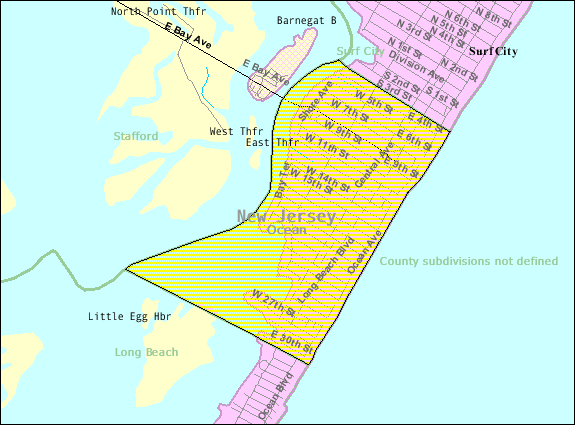
- Census Bureau map of Ship Bottom, New Jersey

- Location in Ocean County Location in New Jersey Location in the United States
- Coordinates: 39.645354°N 74.183003°W
- Country: United States
- state: New Jersey
- County: Ocean
- Incorporated: March 3, 1925 as Ship Bottom-Beach Arlington
- Renamed: 1947 as Ship Bottom

Government
  - Type: Borough
  - Body: Borough Council
  - Mayor: William Huelsenbeck (R, term ends December 31, 2026)
  - Administrator: Kathleen Flanagan
  - Municipal clerk: Kristy DeBoer

Area
  - Total: 1.00 sq mi (2.58 km^{2})
  - Land: 0.71 sq mi (1.84 km^{2})
  - Water: 0.28 sq mi (0.73 km^{2}) 28.48%
  - Rank: 500th of 565 in state 24th of 33 in county
- Elevation: 3 ft (0.91 m)

Population (2020)
  - Total: 1,098
  - Estimate (2023): 1,114
  - Rank: 527th of 565 in state 28th of 33 in county
  - Density: 1,541.8/sq mi (595.3/km^{2})
  - Rank: 332nd of 565 in state 17th of 33 in county
- Time zone: UTC−05:00 (Eastern (EST))
  - Summer (DST): UTC−04:00 (Eastern (EDT))
- ZIP Code: 08008 – Beach Haven
- Area code: 609 exchanges: 207, 361, 492, 494
- FIPS code: 3402967110
- GNIS feature ID: 0885394
- Website: www.shipbottom.org

Ship Bottom is a borough situated on the Jersey Shore, within Ocean County in the U.S. state of New Jersey. As of the 2020 United States census, the borough's population was 1,098, a decrease of 58 (−5.0%) from the 2010 census count of 1,156, which in turn had reflected a decline of 228 (−16.5%) from the 1,384 counted in the 2000 census. The borough is located on Long Beach Island and borders the Atlantic Ocean. The summer population can climb as high as 20,000.

The borough's name was derived from a March 1817 incident in which a woman was saved from a wrecked ship that had capsized as her rescuers used axes to cut through the bottom of the hull.

What is now Ship Bottom was originally incorporated as the borough of Ship Bottom-Beach Arlington by an act of the New Jersey Legislature on March 3, 1925, from portions of Long Beach Township, based on the results of a referendum held on May 23, 1925. The borough name was shortened to Ship Bottom in 1947.

The borough is known as the "Gateway to Long Beach Island", as Route 72 provides the sole road access from Manahawkin in Stafford Township, ending in Ship Bottom as it crosses Manahawkin Bay via the Manahawkin Bay Bridge (formally known as the Dorland J. Henderson Memorial Bridge).

== Geography ==
According to the United States Census Bureau, the borough had a total area of 0.99 square miles (2.58 km^{2}), including 0.71 square miles (1.84 km^{2}) of land and 0.28 square miles (0.73 km^{2}) of water (28.48%).

Unincorporated communities, localities and place names located partially or completely within the borough include Beach Arlington.

The borough borders the Ocean County municipalities of Long Beach Township, Stafford Township, and Surf City.

== Demographics ==
Historical population
Census	Pop.	Note	%±
1930	277		—
1940	396		43.0%
1950	533		34.6%
1960	717		34.5%
1970	1,079		50.5%
1980	1,427		32.3%
1990	1,352		−5.3%
2000	1,384		2.4%
2010	1,156		−16.5%
2020	1,098		−5.0%
2023 (est.)	1,114	▲	1.5%
Population sources: 1930–2000 1930; 1940–2000 2000 2010 2020

=== 2010 census ===
The 2010 United States census counted 1,156 people, 555 households, and 329 families in the borough. The population density was 1,620.6 inhabitants per square mile (625.7/km^{2}). There were 2,066 housing units at an average density of 2,896.3 per square mile (1,118.3/km^{2}). The racial makeup was 92.91% (1,074) White, 1.30% (15) Black or African American, 0.17% (2) Native American, 0.43% (5) Asian, 0.00% (0) Pacific Islander, 3.98% (46) from other races, and 1.21% (14) from two or more races. Hispanic or Latino of any race were 9.17% (106) of the population.

Of the 555 households, 13.7% had children under the age of 18; 46.8% were married couples living together; 7.0% had a female householder with no husband present and 40.7% were non-families. Of all households, 32.8% were made up of individuals and 14.8% had someone living alone who was 65 years of age or older. The average household size was 2.08 and the average family size was 2.60.

12.0% of the population were under the age of 18, 6.9% from 18 to 24, 20.2% from 25 to 44, 32.0% from 45 to 64, and 28.8% who were 65 years of age or older. The median age was 54.2 years. For every 100 females, the population had 104.2 males. For every 100 females ages 18 and older there were 99.4 males.

The Census Bureau's 2006–2010 American Community Survey showed that (in 2010 inflation-adjusted dollars) median household income was $60,673 (with a margin of error of +/− $15,872) and the median family income was $97,841 (+/− $19,072). Males had a median income of $51,641 (+/− $9,381) versus $33,580 (+/− $4,778) for females. The per capita income for the borough was $41,184 (+/− $4,936). About 5.4% of families and 5.2% of the population were below the poverty line, including 6.3% of those under age 18 and 1.9% of those age 65 or over.

=== 2000 census ===
As of the 2000 United States census there were 1,384 people, 664 households, and 395 families residing in the borough. The population density was 1,991.1 inhabitants per square mile (768.8/km^{2}). There were 2,218 housing units at an average density of 3,191.0 per square mile (1,232.1/km^{2}). The racial makeup of the borough was 96.32% White, 0.29% African American, 0.72% Native American, 0.87% Asian, 1.08% from other races, and 0.72% from two or more races. Hispanic or Latino of any race were 5.78% of the population.

There were 664 households, out of which 14.3% had children under the age of 18 living with them, 47.3% were married couples living together, 8.0% had a female householder with no husband present, and 40.4% were non-families. 35.8% of all households were made up of individuals, and 17.0% had someone living alone who was 65 years of age or older. The average household size was 2.08 and the average family size was 2.65.

In the borough the population was spread out, with 14.8% under the age of 18, 5.9% from 18 to 24, 22.7% from 25 to 44, 29.7% from 45 to 64, and 26.9% who were 65 years of age or older. The median age was 50 years. For every 100 females, there were 92.8 males. For every 100 females age 18 and over, there were 94.2 males.

The median income for a household in the borough was $42,098, and the median income for a family was $60,417. Males had a median income of $36,382 versus $28,958 for females. The per capita income for the borough was $27,870. About 4.1% of families and 8.2% of the population were below the poverty line, including 15.0% of those under age 18 and 2.8% of those age 65 or over.

== Government ==
=== Local government ===
Ship Bottom is governed under the borough form of New Jersey municipal government, which is used in 218 municipalities (of the 564) statewide, making it the most common form of government in New Jersey. The governing body is comprised of the mayor and the borough council, with all positions elected at-large on a partisan basis as part of the November general election. The mayor is elected directly by the voters to a four-year term of office. The borough council includes six members elected to serve three-year terms on a staggered basis, with two seats coming up for election each year in a three-year cycle. The borough form of government used by Ship Bottom is a "weak mayor / strong council" government in which council members act as the legislative body with the mayor presiding at meetings and voting only in the event of a tie. The mayor can veto ordinances subject to an override by a two-thirds majority vote of the council. The mayor makes committee and liaison assignments for council members, and most appointments are made by the mayor with the advice and consent of the council. Each Council member chairs a committee that oversees a department: Revenue and Finance; Public Safety; Water/Sewer; Parks and Recreation; Public Property and Community Affairs; and Public Works.

As of 2022, the mayor of Ship Bottom Borough is Republican William Huelsenbeck, whose term of office ends on December 31, 2022. Members of the Ship Bottom Borough Council are Council President Edward English (R, 2023), Robert J. Butkus (R, 2022), David Hartman (R, 2023), Peter J. Rossi Sr. (R, 2024), Tom Tallon (R, 2022) and Joseph Valyo (R, 2024).

=== Federal, state and county representation ===
Ship Bottom is located in the 2nd Congressional District and is part of New Jersey's 9th state legislative district.

For the 119th United States Congress, New Jersey's 2nd congressional district is represented by Jeff Van Drew (R, Dennis Township). New Jersey is represented in the United States Senate by Democrats Cory Booker (Newark, term ends 2027) and Andy Kim (Moorestown, term ends 2031).

For the 2026–2027 session, the 9th legislative district of the New Jersey Legislature is represented in the State Senate by Carmen Amato (R, Berkeley Township) and in the General Assembly by Greg Myhre (R, Stafford Township) and Brian E. Rumpf (R, Little Egg Harbor Township).

Ocean County is governed by a Board of County Commissioners composed of five members who are elected on an at-large basis in partisan elections and serving staggered three-year terms of office, with either one or two seats coming up for election each year as part of the November general election. At an annual reorganization held in the beginning of January, the board chooses a director and a deputy director from among its members. As of 2025, Ocean County's Commissioners (with party affiliation, term-end year and residence) are:

John P. Kelly (R, 2025, Eagleswood Township), Virginia E. Haines (R, 2025, Toms River), Robert Arace (R, Manchester Township, 2027) Jennifer Bacchione (R, Berkeley Township, 2027) and Frank Sadeghi (R, 2026, Toms River).

Constitutional officers elected on a countywide basis are: Clerk Scott M. Colabella (R, 2025, Barnegat Light), Sheriff Michael G. Mastronardy (R, 2025; Toms River) and Surrogate Jeffrey Moran (R, 2028, Beachwood).

=== Politics ===
As of March 2011, there were a total of 988 registered voters in Ship Bottom, of which 142 (14.4%) were registered as Democrats, 497 (50.3%) were registered as Republicans and 349 (35.3%) were registered as Unaffiliated. There were no voters registered to other parties. Among the borough's 2010 Census population, 85.5% (vs. 63.2% in Ocean County) were registered to vote, including 97.1% of those ages 18 and over (vs. 82.6% countywide).

Gubernatorial election results for Ship Bottom
Year	Republican		Democratic		Third party(ies)	
Year	No.	%	No.	%	No.	%
2025	415	55.70%	330	44.30%	0	0.00%
2021	372	59.52%	252	40.32%	1	0.16%
2017	297	60.12%	189	38.26%	8	1.62%
2013	381	75.30%	120	23.72%	5	0.99%
2009	349	63.69%	161	29.38%	38	6.93%
2005	308	56.62%	214	39.34%	22	4.04%

In the 2012 presidential election, Republican Mitt Romney received 57.3% of the vote (335 cast), ahead of Democrat Barack Obama with 42.4% (248 votes), and other candidates with 0.3% (2 votes), among the 590 ballots cast by the borough's 998 registered voters (5 ballots were spoiled), for a turnout of 59.1%. In the 2008 presidential election, Republican John McCain received 57.2% of the vote (419 cast), ahead of Democrat Barack Obama with 40.3% (295 votes) and other candidates with 1.4% (10 votes), among the 732 ballots cast by the borough's 1,036 registered voters, for a turnout of 70.7%. In the 2004 presidential election, Republican George W. Bush received 57.3% of the vote (449 ballots cast), outpolling Democrat John Kerry with 41.5% (325 votes) and other candidates with 0.6% (7 votes), among the 784 ballots cast by the borough's 1,084 registered voters, for a turnout percentage of 72.3.

Presidential Elections Results
Year	Republican	Democratic	Third Parties
2024	53.6% 460	45.2% 388	1.2% 10
2020	51.9% 455	46.8% 410	1.3% 7
2016	57.9% 419	40.2% 291	1.9% 14
2012	57.3% 335	42.4% 248	0.3% 2
2008	57.2% 419	40.3% 295	1.4% 10
2004	57.3% 449	41.5% 325	0.6% 7

In the 2013 gubernatorial election, Republican Chris Christie received 75.3% of the vote (381 cast), ahead of Democrat Barbara Buono with 23.7% (120 votes), and other candidates with 1.0% (5 votes), among the 523 ballots cast by the borough's 967 registered voters (17 ballots were spoiled), for a turnout of 54.1%. In the 2009 gubernatorial election, Republican Chris Christie received 63.2% of the vote (349 ballots cast), ahead of Democrat Jon Corzine with 29.2% (161 votes), Independent Chris Daggett with 5.8% (32 votes) and other candidates with 0.9% (5 votes), among the 552 ballots cast by the borough's 1,005 registered voters, yielding a 54.9% turnout.

United States Senate election results for Ship Bottom1
Year	Republican		Democratic		Third party(ies)	
Year	No.	%	No.	%	No.	%
2024	430	52.00%	393	47.52%	4	0.48%
2018	349	55.40%	270	42.86%	11	1.75%
2012	318	57.30%	228	41.08%	9	1.62%
2006	289	57.57%	205	40.84%	8	1.59%

United States Senate election results for Ship Bottom2
Year	Republican		Democratic		Third party(ies)	
Year	No.	%	No.	%	No.	%
2020	457	53.70%	386	45.36%	8	0.94%
2014	251	62.28%	146	36.23%	6	1.49%
2013	202	62.93%	114	35.51%	5	1.56%
2008	400	60.24%	255	38.40%	9	1.36%

== Education ==
For pre-kindergarten through sixth grade, public school students attend the Long Beach Island Consolidated School District, which also serves students from Barnegat Light, Harvey Cedars, Long Beach Township and Surf City. As of the 2020–21 school year, the district, comprised of two schools, had an enrollment of 215 students and 30.7 classroom teachers (on an FTE basis), for a student–teacher ratio of 7.0:1. Schools in the district (with 2020–21 enrollment data from the National Center for Education Statistics) are Ethel Jacobsen School in Surf City with 111 students in pre-kindergarten to second grade and Long Beach Island Grade School in Ship Bottom with 125 students in grades 3–6. The district's board of education is comprised of nine members who are directly elected from the constituent municipalities on a staggered basis, with three members elected each year. Of the nine seats, one is elected from ShipBottom.

Students in public school for seventh through twelfth grades attend the Southern Regional School District, which serves the five municipalities in the Long Beach Island Consolidated School District, along with students from Beach Haven and Stafford Township, as well as students from Ocean Township (including its Waretown section) who attend as part of a sending/receiving relationship. Schools in the district (with 2020–21 enrollment data from the National Center for Education Statistics) are Southern Regional Middle School with 902 students in grades 7–8 and Southern Regional High School with 1,975 students in grades 9–12. Both schools are in the Manahawkin section of Stafford Township.

== Transportation ==
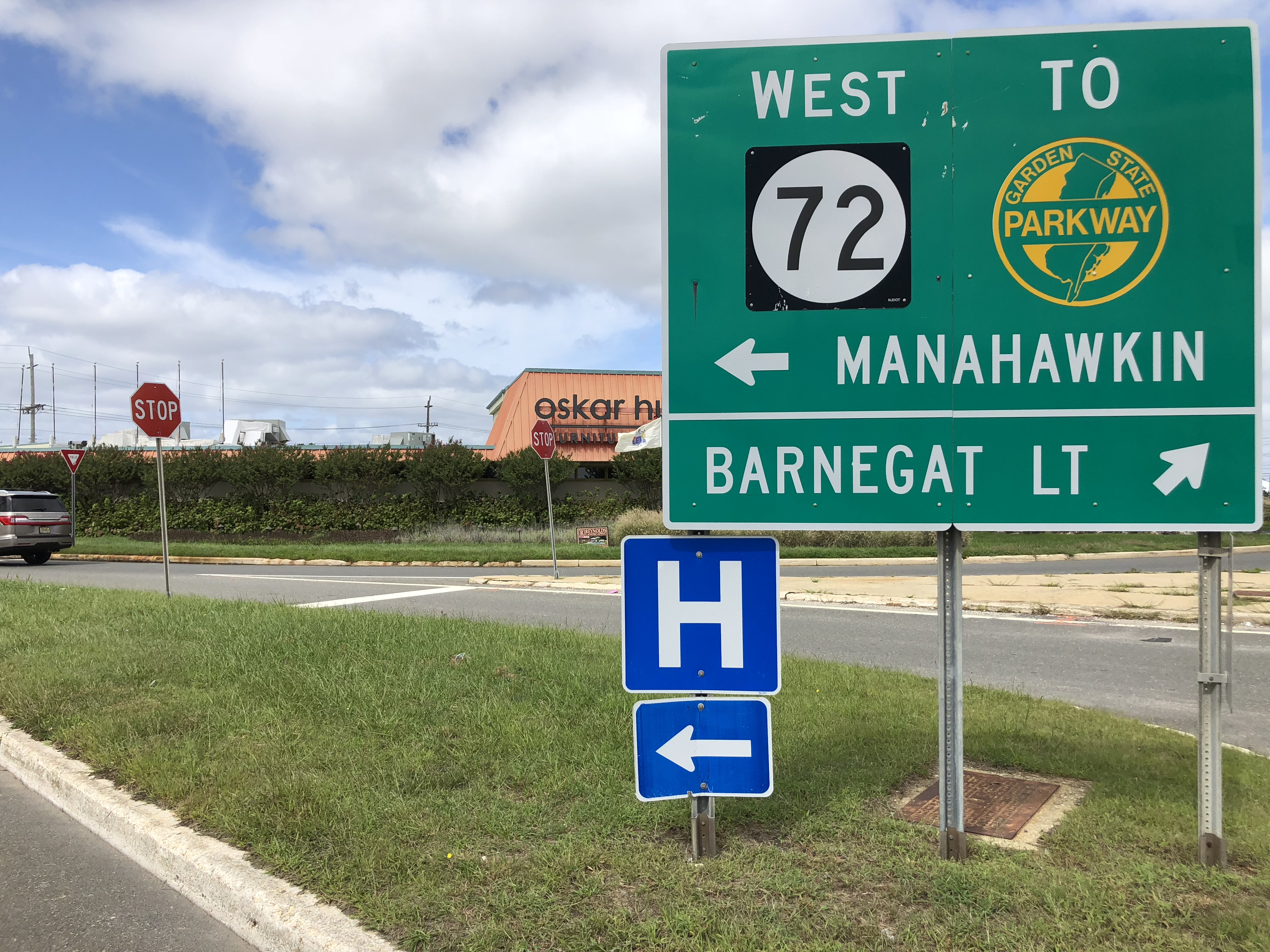
Route 72 westbound in Ship Bottom, the route's eastern terminus

=== Roads and highways ===
As of May 2010, the borough had a total of 18.57 miles (29.89 km) of roadways, of which 13.32 miles (21.44 km) were maintained by the municipality, 4.65 miles (7.48 km) by Ocean County and 0.60 miles (0.97 km) by the New Jersey Department of Transportation.

The eastern terminus of Route 72 is in Ship Bottom, which connects the borough to the Manahawkin section of Stafford Township via the Manahawkin Bay Bridge (formally known as the Dorland J. Henderson Memorial Bridge).

=== Public transportation ===
Ocean Ride local service is provided on the OC9 Long Beach Island route.

The LBI Shuttle operates along Long Beach Boulevard, providing free service every 5 to 20 minutes from 10:00 AM to 10:00 PM. It serves the Long Beach Island municipalities / communities of Barnegat Light, Loveladies, Harvey Cedars, North Beach, Surf City, Ship Bottom, Long Beach Township, Beach Haven and Holgate.

== Climate ==
According to the Köppen climate classification system, Ship Bottom has a humid subtropical climate (Cfa) with hot, moderately humid summers, cool winters and year-around precipitation. Cfa climates are characterized by all months having an average mean temperature above 32.0 °F (0.0 °C), at least four months with an average mean temperature at or above 50.0 °F (10.0 °C), at least one month with an average mean temperature at or above 71.6 °F (22.0 °C) and no significant precipitation difference between seasons. During the summer months in Ship Bottom, a cooling afternoon sea breeze is present on most days, but episodes of extreme heat and humidity can occur with heat index values at or above 95.0 °F (35.0 °C). During the winter months, episodes of extreme cold and wind can occur with wind chill values below 0.0 °F (−17.8 °C). The plant hardiness zone at Ship Bottom Beach is 7a with an average annual extreme minimum air temperature of 3.9 °F (−15.6 °C). The average seasonal (November–April) snowfall total is 12 to 18 inches (300 to 460 mm) and the average snowiest month is February, which corresponds with the annual peak in nor'easter activity.

Climate data for Ship Bottom Beach, NJ (1981–2010 Averages)
Month	Jan	Feb	Mar	Apr	May	Jun	Jul	Aug	Sep	Oct	Nov	Dec	Year
Mean daily maximum °F (°C)	40.2 (4.6)	42.4 (5.8)	49.2 (9.6)	57.7 (14.3)	68.0 (20.0)	77.2 (25.1)	82.6 (28.1)	81.4 (27.4)	75.5 (24.2)	64.9 (18.3)	54.9 (12.7)	45.1 (7.3)	61.7 (16.5)
Daily mean °F (°C)	33.1 (0.6)	35.2 (1.8)	41.6 (5.3)	50.3 (10.2)	60.3 (15.7)	69.6 (20.9)	75.3 (24.1)	74.3 (23.5)	67.9 (19.9)	56.8 (13.8)	47.5 (8.6)	37.9 (3.3)	54.2 (12.3)
Mean daily minimum °F (°C)	26.0 (−3.3)	28.0 (−2.2)	33.9 (1.1)	42.9 (6.1)	52.5 (11.4)	62.1 (16.7)	68.1 (20.1)	67.1 (19.5)	60.3 (15.7)	48.7 (9.3)	40.0 (4.4)	30.7 (−0.7)	46.8 (8.2)
Average precipitation inches (mm)	3.33 (85)	3.01 (76)	4.09 (104)	3.58 (91)	3.07 (78)	2.96 (75)	3.93 (100)	4.22 (107)	3.07 (78)	3.52 (89)	3.12 (79)	3.54 (90)	41.44 (1,053)
Average relative humidity (%)	66.9	65.0	63.2	64.5	67.3	71.6	71.1	72.5	71.6	70.2	68.9	67.8	68.4
Average dew point °F (°C)	23.3 (−4.8)	24.6 (−4.1)	30.0 (−1.1)	38.8 (3.8)	49.4 (9.7)	60.0 (15.6)	65.3 (18.5)	64.9 (18.3)	58.4 (14.7)	47.2 (8.4)	37.8 (3.2)	28.2 (−2.1)	44.1 (6.7)
Source: PRISM

Climate data for Atlantic City, NJ Ocean Water Temperature (24 SW Ship Bottom)
Month	Jan	Feb	Mar	Apr	May	Jun	Jul	Aug	Sep	Oct	Nov	Dec	Year
Daily mean °F (°C)	37 (3)	35 (2)	42 (6)	48 (9)	56 (13)	63 (17)	70 (21)	73 (23)	70 (21)	61 (16)	53 (12)	44 (7)	54 (12)
Source: NOAA

== Ecology ==
According to the A. W. Kuchler U.S. potential natural vegetation types, Ship Bottom would have a dominant vegetation type of Northern Cordgrass (73) with a dominant vegetation form of Coastal Prairie (20).

== Notable people ==
People who were born in, residents of, or otherwise closely associated with Ship Bottom include:

- Matt Cook (born 1984), actor known mostly for his roles as Mo McCracken on the TBS sitcom Clipped and as Lowell in the CBS sitcom Man with a Plan
- Zack Hanle (c. 1915–1999), was a cooking author and journalist who served as an editor of Bon Appetit, in addition to writing books about cooking, diet and exercise
- Matt Kmosko (born 1972), former U.S. soccer defender who played three and a half seasons in Major League Soccer
- Stanley B. Smullen (1906–1998), businessman who served briefly on the Philadelphia City Council

Preceded by Surf City	Beaches of New Jersey	Succeeded by North Beach Haven
