= Manahawkin Baptist Church =

Historic church in New Jersey, United States

- U.S. National Register of Historic Places
- New Jersey Register of Historic Places
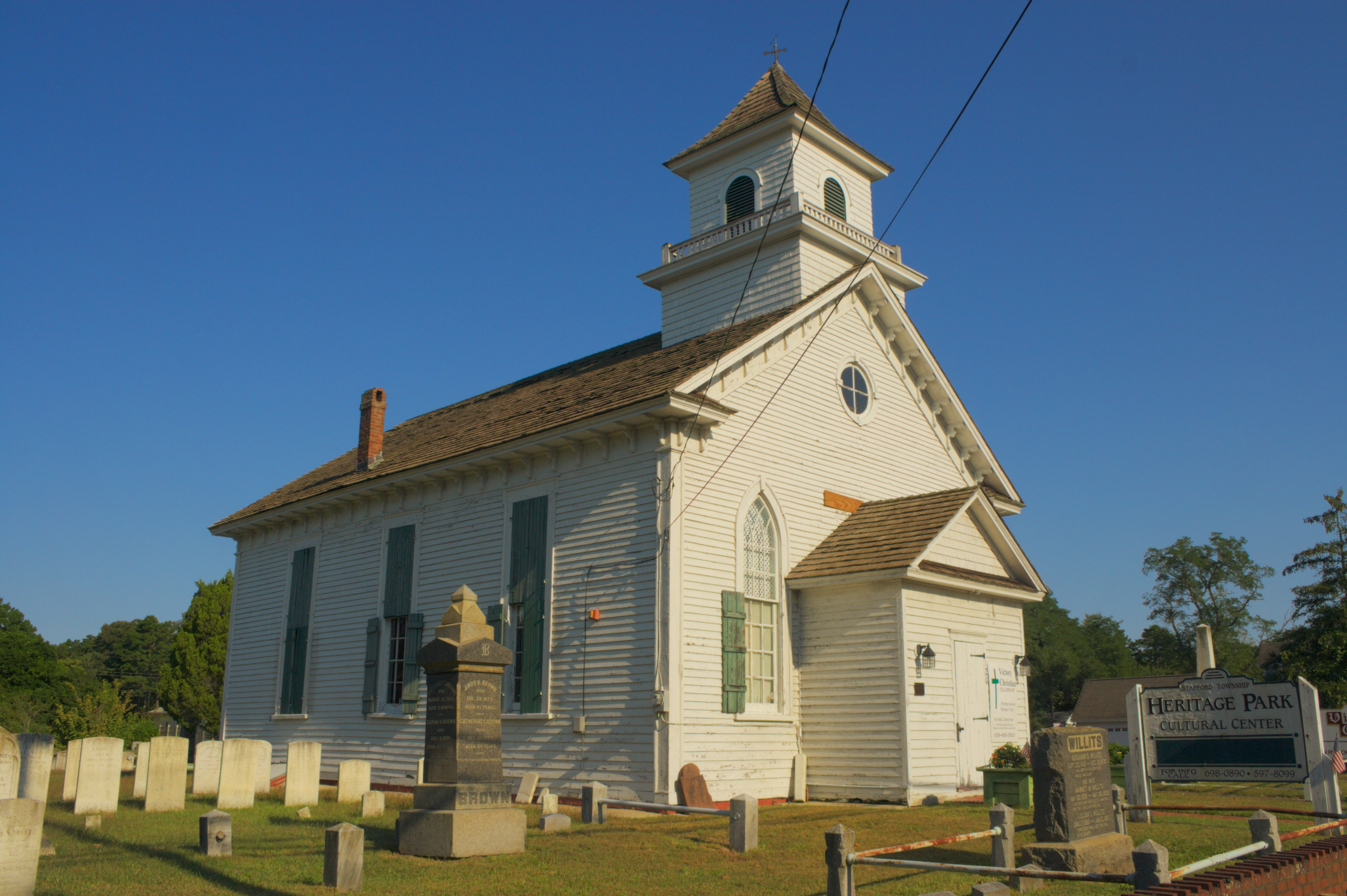

- Location within Ocean County, New Jersey Location within New Jersey Location within the United States
- Location: N. Main St. (US 9) and Lehigh Avenue, Manahawkin, New Jersey
- Coordinates: 39°41′55.1″N 74°15′27.5″W
- Built: 1864
- NRHP reference No.: 73001131
- NJRHP No.: 2323

Significant dates
- Added to NRHP: April 3, 1973
- Designated NJRHP: May 1, 1972

Manahawkin Baptist Church, also known as the Free Church of Manahawkin, is a historic church in the Manahawkin section of Stafford Township in Ocean County, New Jersey. The church was added to the National Register of Historic Places on April 3, 1973, for its significance in education, military history, and religion.

== History ==
The first church in the area was opened on August 24, 1758. According to local citizens, a house of worship was opened as early as 1745. A building was erected at this time and a tract of land given as a gift of the John Haywood family. They had settled in the area in 1743, after leaving their ancestral home in Coventry, England. At that time, it was the only church building in the area that became known as Ocean County. The first missionary, Reverend Thomas Thompson served the area from 1745 to 1751. He was assigned to Stafford Township by the "English Society for the Propagation of the Gospel in Foreign Parts." A spirit of tolerance was evident in the early church, as it ministered to people of several Protestant faiths.

In 1770, Captain Thomas Webb is reported to have visited the village, preached at the church, and formed a Baptist Society with nine members. In 1774, when the church called its first pastor, the Reverend H. Crossley, the congregation numbered 19.

During the Revolutionary War, in the "Skirmish at Manahawken", between Captain Rueben Randolphs's Manahawkin Militia and John Beacon's "Band of Pine Pirates" or "Refugees", wounded members of the Manahawkin Militia were cared for in the church. Several veterans of the Revolution are buried in the cemetery surrounding the church along with local residents and shipwreck victims. Services were discontinued during the War and the Baptist Society was not reorganized until 1801.

In 1805, the church baptized forty-four people and the membership increased to sixty-eight. On April 27, 1857, the church was incorporated under the laws of the state of New Jersey by the five trustees. By 1864, weakening walls prompted the appointment of a committee to start remodeling and rebuilding the structure. The rebuilt church with the original within it was completed under the leadership of Reverend A. H. Folwell.

On July 10, 1867, during the pastorate of Reverend E.S. Browe, the dedication service was held. The cost of rebuilding and redecorating the church building cost 2,776 dollars. The records show that all but $200.00 had come from church members and interested friends.

The centennial anniversary of the founding as a Baptist Society was held on August 25, 1870. The church building was the only school building in Stafford until after 1800 and the Bible was the only textbook. Reverend E.L. Stager became a pastor in February 1880 but died 2 years later at age 35. Following these events a series of ministers came and went, usually staying about a year. The first parsonage was built in 1882 near the church on Route 9.

On January 12, 1884, Reverend W.W. Eldridge was unanimously called as pastor. The women of the church cleaned the parsonage each week, as Eldridge was a single man. In September 1885, Reverend Warren N. Walden was called as pastor and remained in the position until his death in December 1893. The pastoral call was then extended to the Reverend E.F. Partridge in February 1898. The congregation voted to pay him a yearly sum of $300. A new organ was purchased in 1898, and most likely was the one that remained in the church until a Hammond organ was purchased in 1948.

In 1901, the pastoral call was offered to Herman Joorman, who eventually left the church to serve in the mission field.

From 1901 until 1948, more pastors served the church, with several working only part-time. In 1916, small rooms and a baptistry were added to the original church structure.

Sometime between 1920 and 1925 the church spire was struck by lightning and the spire, roof, and bell were damaged. At that time the steeple was lowered to its present height.

In 1938, church member Jim Shanklin and Jack Kilbert, a seminary student who had just moved to the area, led worship services. The practice continued until 1943 when Kilbert was killed by a mortar round that landed near his tent during the Battle of the Bulge.

Reverend Lauren D Rhine was extended the call to begin the charge here in April 1948. The faithful of the church had just entirely redecorated the church. A new roof was installed and the building was painted inside and out. On Mothers Day 1948 bible school was started with 8 attendees. By 1952 the number had grown to 115. During the summer of 1949, the first daily vacation bible school was started with eight teachers and thirty-nine pupils. By 1950, vacation bible school enrollment had increased to twelve teachers and sixty-eight pupils. At the annual meeting in 1950, the church voted to become a charter church in fellowship with the Association.

In the winter of 1952, a new parsonage was acquired on the corner of Main and Beach Streets in Manahawkin. Reverend and Mrs. Lauren Rhine were the first occupants. Beginner and primary school were held each week. The church membership totaled fifty-eight and the church supported two foreign missionaries.

From 1952 to 1955, the congregation bought 100 feet of land on Route 9, across from the existing building and proposed to build a 32 feet by 60 feet Sunday school there. According to the plans, the building would have a basement and one floor. The building committee chose Bill Shinn, a church member, and a local builder, to oversee the construction, which was completed with volunteer labor.

John Erwin was called to the pulpit on July 6, 1953. Pastor Erwin was the first full-time pastor, as he did not need another job to supplement the income provided by the church. IN 1955, according to the records from church treasurer Althea Fredrickson, $3500 of the church budget, which totaled, $4984, went to the pastor's salary.

Reverend Earl Comfort was called to be a pastor in January 1959. The parsonage was sold for $7500 and a new parsonage was built next to the Sunday School building in June 1961. Between 1962 and 1965 two pieces of property were acquired on the north side of the original church. Both were used for parking. The congregation decided to build a new sanctuary perpendicular to the Sunday School building. The addition would have Sunday School rooms in the basement.
