= Manahawkin Bay Bridge =

- Coordinates: 39°39′42″N 74°12′09″W
- Carries: 4 lanes of Route 72
- Crosses: Manahawkin Bay
- Locale: Ocean County, New Jersey
- Official name: Dorland J. Henderson Memorial Bridge
- Other name(s): The Causeway
- Named for: Dorland J. Henderson

Characteristics
- Design: Dorland J. Henderson
- Material: Steel girder

The Dorland J. Henderson Memorial Bridge, familiarly known as the Manahawkin Bay Bridge or (while technically inaccurate) The Causeway, is a steel girder bridge that spans Manahawkin Bay, carrying traffic along Route 72 between Long Beach Island (LBI) and the Manahawkin section of Stafford Township, in Ocean County, New Jersey. The bridge starts at Manahawkin and ends at Ship Bottom on Long Beach Island. The bridge spans five land masses: the mainland, Long Beach Island, and three intermediate land masses, of which two are small and one is rather large.

The bridge provides views of Barnegat Bay, Little Egg Harbor Bay and the Atlantic City skyline, less than 25 miles (40 km) away.

== Lighting system ==
The main span of the Manahawkin Bay Bridge sports a unique roadway lighting system, unofficially dubbed the "String of Pearls", was designed by NJDOT engineer Dorland J. Henderson; the bridge was officially named after him in 2000. The lighting system, which is made up of 768 separate fluorescent lights recessed in the bridge's side guard rails, was the first of its kind in the world. After being in continuous operation since the 1950s, replacement parts for the lighting system have become unavailable, rendering many of the fluorescent bulbs dark and irreplaceable. The original, fluorescent "String of Pearls" lighting system is being replaced by a modern LED lighting system mimicking the "String of Pearls" effect on the north and south exterior faces of the rehabilitated and new bridge spans, respectively. However, unlike the original, the new side rail lights will be for ornamental purposes as the roadway itself will be lit by traditional overhead lighting. In time for Memorial Day weekend 2016, the new lighting system on the south exterior face of the new bridge was illuminated. The north face will not be illuminated until restoration of the original bridge is completed.

== Structural problems ==
Documented cracks due to metal fatigue have been found in structural members of the bridge. The New Jersey Department of Transportation (NJDOT) had previously taken steps to address the fatigue cracking, including modifying bridge girders and beams with drill stops. The bridge was listed as being structurally deficient in 2004. As the sole access point to/from Long Beach Island and a vital coastal evacuation route in the case of a hurricane, the rapidly deteriorating condition of the bridge was of serious concern. From 2009 to 2010, NJDOT completed a rehabilitation of the deck surface to extend the life of the existing bridge. This project was completed at a cost of $5.5 million and financed through the American Recovery and Reinvestment Act.

== Replacement span ==
From 2010 to 2012, NJDOT completed reviews, design, and planning for a complete $350 million overhaul of the bridge to include a second parallel span to be built just south of the existing span. The new span will include wider shoulders, a bike lane, and a sidewalk for pedestrians. The work will be spread out over four stages. The contract for the first stage, construction of the new span alongside the old one, was awarded in spring 2013, with construction starting in May 2013, lasting through 2020. Future stages include the rehabilitation of the existing trestle bridges over the east and west thoroughfares, replacement of the existing span's entire superstructure, and work to improve the connections at both ends of the bridges with local roadways.
