= Stafford Township, New Jersey =

Township in Ocean County, New Jersey, US

- Township
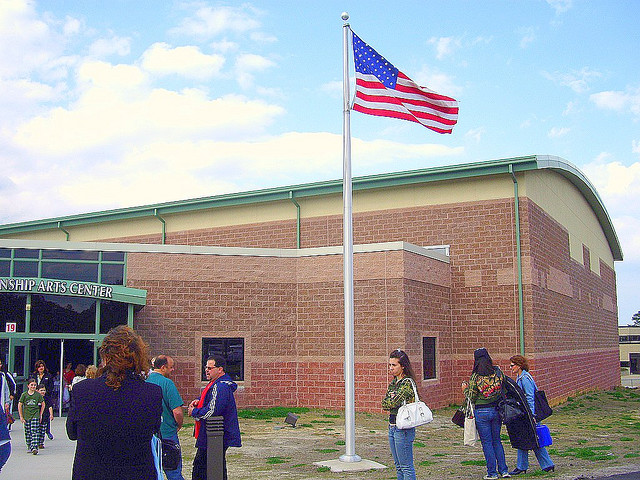
- The Stafford Performing Arts Center in Manahawkin

- logo

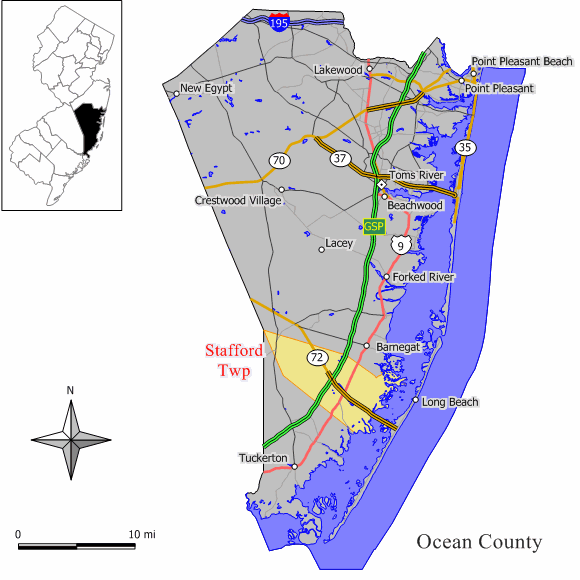
- Map of Stafford Township in Ocean County. Inset; Location of Ocean County highlighted in the State of New Jersey.

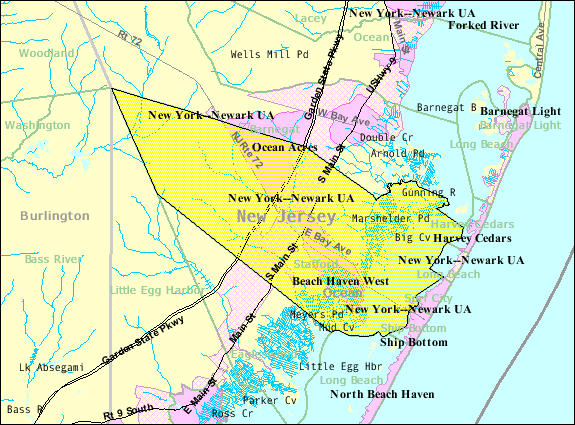
- Census Bureau map of Stafford Township, New Jersey

- Location in Ocean County Location in New Jersey Location in the United States
- Coordinates: 39.705726°N 74.264326°W
- Country: United States
- State: New Jersey
- County: Ocean
- Royal charter: March 3, 1750
- Incorporated: February 21, 1798
- Named for: Staffordshire, England

Government
  - Type: Faulkner Act (small municipality)
  - Body: Township Council
  - Mayor: Robert E. Henken (R, unexpired term ends December 31, 2024)
  - Administrator: Matthew von der Hayden
  - Municipal clerk: Susan Farrell

Area
  - Total: 54.71 sq mi (141.69 km^{2})
  - Land: 46.12 sq mi (119.44 km^{2})
  - Water: 8.59 sq mi (22.26 km^{2}) 15.71%
  - Rank: 29th of 565 in state 5th of 33 in county
- Elevation: 43 ft (13 m)

Population (2020)
  - Total: 28,617
  - Estimate (2023): 30,261
  - Rank: 86th of 565 in state 8th of 33 in county
  - Density: 620.6/sq mi (239.6/km^{2})
  - Rank: 427th of 565 in state 25th of 33 in county
- Time zone: UTC−05:00 (Eastern (EST))
  - Summer (DST): UTC−04:00 (Eastern (EDT))
- ZIP Code: 08050 – Manahawkin
- Area code: 609
- FIPS code: 3402970320
- GNIS feature ID: 0882069
- Website: www.staffordnj.gov

Stafford Township is a township situated on the Jersey Shore in southern Ocean County, within the U.S. state of New Jersey. As of the 2020 United States census, the township's population was 28,617, its highest decennial count ever and an increase of 2,082 (+7.8%) from the 26,535 recorded at the 2010 census, which in turn reflected an increase of 4,003 (+17.8%) from the 22,532 counted in the 2000 census.

Stafford Township is the gateway to the resort communities on Long Beach Island, with Route 72 providing the sole road access to the island, ending in Ship Bottom as it crosses Barnegat Bay via the Manahawkin Bay Bridge (formally known as the Dorland J. Henderson Memorial Bridge). The Garden State Parkway and U.S. Route 9 pass through the township and provide access to Route 72.

== History ==
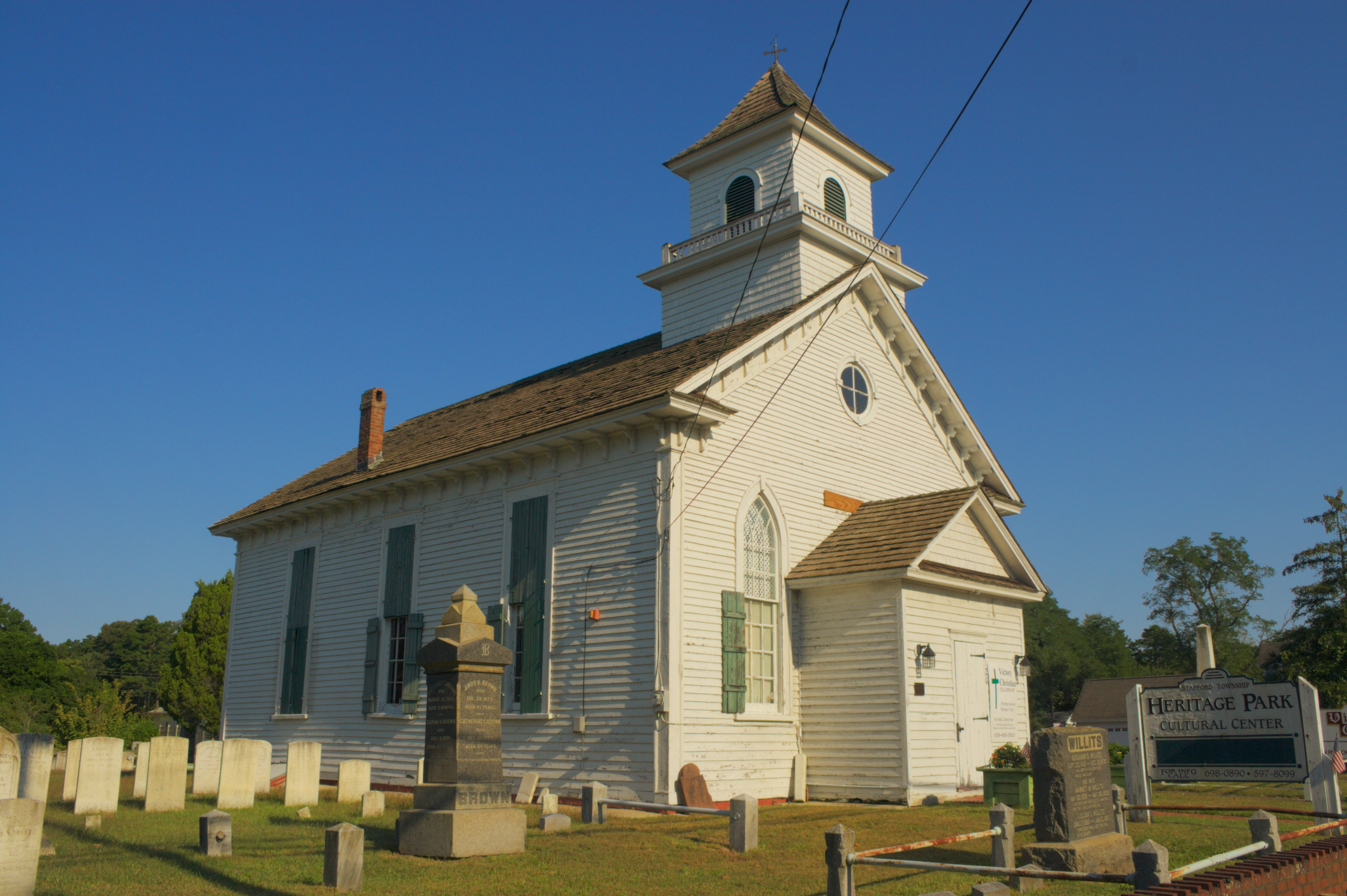
The Manahawkin Baptist Church, built in 1864

Stafford Township was formed by royal charter on March 3, 1750, from portions of Shrewsbury Township, while the area was still part of Monmouth County. It was incorporated as one of New Jersey's first 104 townships by the Township Act of 1798 of the New Jersey Legislature on February 21, 1798, and became part of the newly formed Ocean County on February 15, 1850. Portions of the township were taken to form Union Township (March 10, 1846, now Barnegat Township), Eagleswood Township (March 17, 1874), Long Beach City Borough (September 19, 1894, now Surf City) and Long Beach Township (March 23, 1899). The township was named after Staffordshire, England.

Historically, Stafford Township was a rural area, with the notable exception of the downtown hub of Manahawkin. Significant growth began in the 1950s with the development of resort communities like Beach Haven West and Ocean Acres. These developments coincided with the completion of the Garden State Parkway and the expansion of Route 72, which formerly ran along the two-lane Bay Avenue.

While growing quickly, development was still sparse. Route 72 was still mostly wooded, aside from several car dealerships, gas stations, a drive-in movie theater, and the Manahawkin Executive Airport. The pace of development increased during the 1980s with new residential projects, including the expansion of Beach Haven West and Ocean Acres, transforming the area from seasonal vacation homes to year-round residences. This period also saw the establishment of Stafford Square, the township's first major shopping center. The Manahawkin Airport closed in the early 1990s to make way for commercial developments, including a Walmart and Pathmark. However, part of the runway was left intact until the 2000s, when the St. Mary's of the Pines Catholic Church and All Saints Regional Catholic School were built on the land.

Stafford Township celebrates its history and community spirit through an annual Founders Day event held each June. Originating in 1964 as part of New Jersey’s 300th anniversary celebrations, Founders Day has grown into a vibrant tradition featuring a hometown parade, pie-eating contests, inflatable rides, the Miss Stafford, Jr. Miss Stafford, Little Miss Stafford, and Little Town Crier pageants, and concludes with a fireworks display.

In July 2021, the township buried a 50-year time capsule, which will be opened in 2070. Stafford Township officials included various items, and residents submitted memorabilia from 2020 to give future residents a glimpse of life in Stafford Township during the COVID-19 pandemic.

== Geography ==
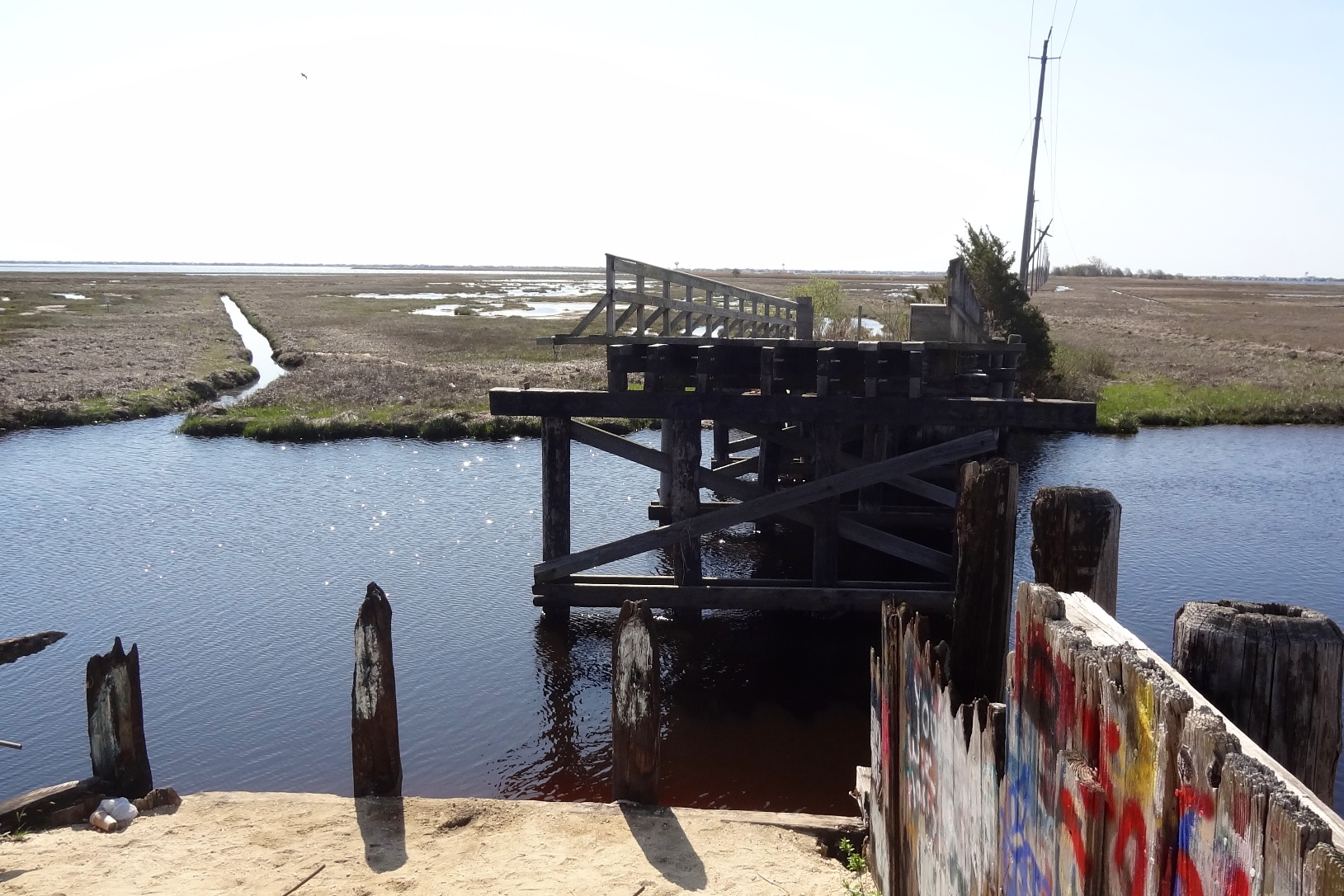
The "Bridge to nowhere" at the end of Stafford Avenue, part of the Edwin B. Forsythe National Wildlife Refuge

According to the United States Census Bureau, the township had a total area of 54.71 square miles (141.69 km^{2}), including 46.11 square miles (119.44 km^{2}) of land and 8.59 square miles (22.26 km^{2}) of water (15.71%). Stafford Township straddles the breadth of southern Ocean County from its eastern border at the Jersey Shore to the county's western border with Burlington County, New Jersey.

Beach Haven West (2010 Census population of 4,143) and Manahawkin (2,413) are unincorporated communities and census-designated places contained within Stafford Township, while Ocean Acres (16,142) is a census-designated place and unincorporated area split between Barnegat Township and Stafford Township.

Other unincorporated communities, localities and place names located partially or entirely within the township include Bayside, Beach View, Bonnet Island, Cedar Bonnet, Cedar Grove, Cedar Run, Manahawkin Landing, Mayetta, South Beach View, and Sunshine City. Warren Grove is an unincorporated rural area located within the township as well as portions of Barnegat Township and Little Egg Harbor Township in the heart of the Pine Barrens.

The township borders the Ocean County municipalities of Barnegat Township, Eagleswood Township, Harvey Cedars, Little Egg Harbor Township, Long Beach Township, Ship Bottom, and Surf City.

== Demographics ==
Historical population
Census	Pop.	Note	%±
1790	883		—
1810	1,239		—
1820	1,428		15.3%
1830	2,059		44.2%
1840	2,149		4.4%
1850	1,384	*	−35.6%
1860	1,436		3.8%
1870	1,514		5.4%
1880	1,008	*	−33.4%
1890	1,095		8.6%
1900	1,009	*	−7.9%
1910	934		−7.4%
1920	830		−11.1%
1930	1,039		25.2%
1940	1,253		20.6%
1950	1,347		7.5%
1960	1,930		43.3%
1970	3,684		90.9%
1980	10,385		181.9%
1990	13,325		28.3%
2000	22,532		69.1%
2010	26,535		17.8%
2020	28,617		7.8%
2023 (est.)	30,261		5.7%
Population sources: 1790–1920 1850–2000; 1850–1870 1850; 1870 1880–1890; 1890–1910 1910–1930; 1940–2000 2000; 2010 2020 * = Lost territory in previous decade.

=== 2020 census ===
The 2020 United States census counted 28,617 people in the township.

=== 2010 census ===
The 2010 United States census counted 26,535 people, 10,096 households, and 7,249 families in the township. The population density was 578.8 per square mile (223.5/km^{2}). There were 13,604 housing units at an average density of 296.7 per square mile (114.6/km^{2}). The racial makeup was 94.51% (25,077) White, 1.05% (278) Black or African American, 0.16% (42) Native American, 1.48% (394) Asian, 0.03% (8) Pacific Islander, 1.68% (445) from other races, and 1.10% (291) from two or more races. Hispanic or Latino of any race were 5.31% (1,410) of the population.

Of the 10,096 households, 29.5% had children under the age of 18; 58.9% were married couples living together; 9.2% had a female householder with no husband present and 28.2% were non-families. Of all households, 23.9% were made up of individuals and 13.6% had someone living alone who was 65 years of age or older. The average household size was 2.61 and the average family size was 3.10.

22.8% of the population were under the age of 18, 7.1% from 18 to 24, 21.8% from 25 to 44, 28.7% from 45 to 64, and 19.6% who were 65 years of age or older. The median age was 43.9 years. For every 100 females, the population had 93.3 males. For every 100 females ages 18 and older there were 90.0 males.

The Census Bureau's 2006–2010 American Community Survey showed that (in 2010 inflation-adjusted dollars) median household income was $68,250 (with a margin of error of +/− $3,646) and the median family income was $80,059 (+/− $4,290). Males had a median income of $60,398 (+/− $4,092) versus $43,138 (+/− $7,270) for females. The per capita income for the borough was $31,690 (+/− $1,364). About 2.9% of families and 4.0% of the population were below the poverty line, including 3.1% of those under age 18 and 6.8% of those age 65 or over.

=== 2000 census ===
As of the 2000 United States census there were 22,532 people, 8,535 households, and 6,435 families residing in the township. The population density was 484.3 inhabitants per square mile (187.0/km^{2}). There were 11,522 housing units at an average density of 247.6 per square mile (95.6/km^{2}). The racial makeup of the township was 96.79% White, 0.74% African American, 0.09% Native American, 0.96% Asian, 0.03% Pacific Islander, 0.51% from other races, and 0.88% from two or more races. Hispanic or Latino of any race were 2.41% of the population.

There were 8,535 households, out of which 31.7% had children under the age of 18 living with them, 63.6% were married couples living together, 8.5% had a female householder with no husband present, and 24.6% were non-families. 20.6% of all households were made up of individuals, and 10.5% had someone living alone who was 65 years of age or older. The average household size was 2.61 and the average family size was 3.01.

In the township the population was spread out, with 23.8% under the age of 18, 5.8% from 18 to 24, 27.7% from 25 to 44, 23.9% from 45 to 64, and 18.8% who were 65 years of age or older. The median age was 40 years. For every 100 females, there were 94.1 males. For every 100 females age 18 and over, there were 89.8 males.

The median income for a household in the township was $52,269, and the median income for a family was $59,072. Males had a median income of $44,706 versus $30,687 for females. The per capita income for the township was $25,397. About 2.3% of families and 4.0% of the population were below the poverty line, including 4.0% of those under age 18 and 6.1% of those age 65 or over.

== Government ==
=== Local government ===
Stafford Township is governed within the Faulkner Act, formally known as the Optional Municipal Charter Law, under the Small Municipality form of New Jersey municipal government. The township is one of 18 (of the 564) municipalities statewide that use this form of government, which is only available to municipalities with fewer than 12,000 residents at the time of adoption. The governing body is comprised of the Mayor and the six-member Township Council. The Mayor and Council members are elected to three-year terms on a concurrent basis in partisan elections. The mayor can vote on all issues. The seven-member governing body is empowered to enact local ordinances, levy municipal taxes and conduct the community's affairs. In a November 2010 referendum, voters approved a change to shift from nonpartisan elections held in May to partisan elections held as part of the November general election, with costs savings from the shift cited as the primary justification for the move.

As of 2024, the mayor of Stafford Township is Republican Robert E. Henken, who was appointed to serve an unexpired term of office ending December 31, 2024. Members of the Stafford Township Council are Council President Lisa D. Mower, Steven Esposito, Paul Krier, Owen LaRocca (appointed to serve an unexpired term), Amy Otte and Thomas N. Steadman; all are Republicans and all are serving terms which end concurrently in 2024.

After Greg Myhre stepped down from office to take a seat in the New Jersey General Assembly in January 2024, councilmember Robert Henken was appointed to fill his seat as mayor; in turn, Owen LaRocca was appointed to fill Henken's vacant council seat.

In November 2022, Steven Esposito was elected to fill a vacant council seat. Thomas Bresnahanhad been appointed the previous August to fill the seat after Anthony Guariglia had resigned.

=== Federal, state, and county representation ===
Stafford Township is in the 2nd Congressional District and is part of New Jersey's 9th state legislative district.

For the 119th United States Congress, New Jersey's 2nd congressional district is represented by Jeff Van Drew (R, Dennis Township). New Jersey is represented in the United States Senate by Democrats Cory Booker (Newark, term ends 2027) and Andy Kim (Moorestown, term ends 2031).

For the 2026–2027 session, the 9th legislative district of the New Jersey Legislature is represented in the State Senate by Carmen Amato (R, Berkeley Township) and in the General Assembly by Greg Myhre (R, Stafford Township) and Brian E. Rumpf (R, Little Egg Harbor Township).

Ocean County is governed by a Board of County Commissioners composed of five members who are elected on an at-large basis in partisan elections and serving staggered three-year terms of office, with either one or two seats coming up for election each year as part of the November general election. At an annual reorganization held in the beginning of January, the board chooses a director and a deputy director from among its members. As of 2025, Ocean County's Commissioners (with party affiliation, term-end year and residence) are:

John P. Kelly (R, 2025, Eagleswood Township), Virginia E. Haines (R, 2025, Toms River), Robert Arace (R, Manchester Township, 2027) Jennifer Bacchione (R, Berkeley Township, 2027) and Frank Sadeghi (R, 2026, Toms River).

Constitutional officers elected on a countywide basis are: Clerk Scott M. Colabella (R, 2025, Barnegat Light), Sheriff Michael G. Mastronardy (R, 2025; Toms River) and Surrogate Jeffrey Moran (R, 2028, Beachwood).

=== Politics ===
As of March 2011, there were a total of 18,029 registered voters in Stafford Township, of which 3,451 (19.1%) were registered as Democrats, 4,944 (27.4%) were registered as Republicans and 9,630 (53.4%) were registered as Unaffiliated. There were 4 voters registered as Libertarians or Greens. Among the township's 2010 Census population, 67.9% (vs. 63.2% in Ocean County) were registered to vote, including 88.0% of those ages 18 and over (vs. 82.6% countywide).

Gubernatorial election results for Stafford Township
Year	Republican		Democratic		Third party(ies)	
Year	No.	%	No.	%	No.	%
2025	9,043	63.94%	5,031	35.57%	70	0.49%
2021	7,844	69.54%	3,358	29.77%	78	0.69%
2017	4,456	59.29%	2,894	38.50%	166	2.21%
2013	5,602	74.38%	1,829	24.28%	101	1.34%
2009	5,746	65.37%	2,511	28.57%	533	6.06%
2005	4,065	55.05%	2,952	39.98%	367	4.97%

In the 2012 presidential election, Republican Mitt Romney received 57.9% of the vote (7,159 cast), ahead of Democrat Barack Obama with 41.0% (5,075 votes), and other candidates with 1.1% (138 votes), among the 12,480 ballots cast by the township's 18,963 registered voters (108 ballots were spoiled), for a turnout of 65.8%. In the 2008 presidential election, Republican John McCain received 57.3% of the vote (7,508 cast), ahead of Democrat Barack Obama with 40.8% (5,351 votes) and other candidates with 1.1% (150 votes), among the 13,113 ballots cast by the township's 18,430 registered voters, for a turnout of 71.2%. In the 2004 presidential election, Republican George W. Bush received 60.4% of the vote (7,396 ballots cast), outpolling Democrat John Kerry with 38.6% (4,722 votes) and other candidates with 0.5% (90 votes), among the 12,239 ballots cast by the township's 16,776 registered voters, for a turnout percentage of 73.0.

Presidential Elections Results
Year	Republican	Democratic	Third Parties
2024	66.0% 11,839	32.7% 5,867	1.3% 209
2020	62.4% 11,156	35.8% 6,408	1.8% 259
2016	65.8% 9,116	31.2% 4,316	3.0% 413
2012	57.9% 7,159	41.0% 5,075	1.1% 138
2008	57.3% 7,508	40.8% 5,351	1.1% 150
2004	60.4% 7,396	38.6% 4,722	0.5% 90

In the 2013 gubernatorial election, Republican Chris Christie received 74.4% of the vote (5,602 cast), ahead of Democrat Barbara Buono with 24.3% (1,829 votes), and other candidates with 1.3% (101 votes), among the 7,676 ballots cast by the township's 18,813 registered voters (144 ballots were spoiled), for a turnout of 40.8%. In the 2009 gubernatorial election, Republican Chris Christie received 64.9% of the vote (5,746 ballots cast), ahead of Democrat Jon Corzine with 28.3% (2,511 votes), Independent Chris Daggett with 4.9% (431 votes) and other candidates with 1.2% (102 votes), among the 8,859 ballots cast by the township's 18,174 registered voters, yielding a 48.7% turnout.

United States Senate election results for Stafford Township1
Year	Republican		Democratic		Third party(ies)	
Year	No.	%	No.	%	No.	%
2024	10,976	64.27%	5,971	34.96%	132	0.77%
2018	7,525	65.30%	3,650	31.68%	348	3.02%
2012	6,578	56.67%	4,741	40.85%	288	2.48%
2006	4,212	58.30%	2,837	39.27%	176	2.44%

United States Senate election results for Stafford Township2
Year	Republican		Democratic		Third party(ies)	
Year	No.	%	No.	%	No.	%
2020	10,817	62.58%	6,193	35.83%	276	1.60%
2014	3,640	60.32%	2,252	37.32%	142	2.35%
2013	2,855	63.84%	1,588	35.51%	29	0.65%
2008	6,755	56.04%	5,080	42.15%	218	1.81%

== Education ==
The Stafford Township School District serves students in pre-kindergarten through sixth grade. As of the 2018–19 school year, the district, comprised of five schools, had an enrollment of 2,198 students and 190.0 classroom teachers (on an FTE basis), for a student–teacher ratio of 11.6:1. Schools in the district (with 2018–19 enrollment data from the National Center for Education Statistics) are Oxycocus School with 178 students in pre-kindergarten, Ronald L. Meinders Primary Learning Center with 274 students in kindergarten, Ocean Acres Elementary School with 527 students in grades 1–2, McKinley Avenue Elementary School with 570 students in grades 3–4 and Stafford Intermediate School with 651 students in grades 5–6.

For seventh through twelfth grades, public school students are served by the Southern Regional School District, which serves the five municipalities in the Long Beach Island Consolidated School District—Barnegat Light, Harvey Cedars, Long Beach Township, Ship Bottom and Surf City—along with students from Beach Haven and Stafford Township, together with students from Ocean Township who attend as part of a sending/receiving relationship with the Ocean Township School District. Schools in the district (with 2018–2019 enrollment data from the National Center for Education Statistics) are Southern Regional Middle School with 934 students in grades 7–8 and Southern Regional High School with 1,952 students in grades 9–12. Both schools are in the Manahawkin section of Stafford Township.

Marine Academy of Technology and Environmental Science is a comprehensive and challenging career high school that is located on a hill in Manahawkin on the outskirts of the Southern Regional School District. MATES is part of the Ocean County Vocational Technical School and serves students from all of Ocean County.

St. Mary Academy, a K–8 school of the Roman Catholic Diocese of Trenton, is in Stafford Township, near Manahawkin CDP. It is managed by St. Mary Church of Barnegat. From 1997, until 2019 it operated as All Saints Regional Catholic School and was collectively managed by five churches. In 2019 St. Mary took entire control of the school, which remained on the same Manahawkin campus, and changed its name. The other churches no longer operate the school but still may send students there.

== Media ==
The Asbury Park Press and The Press of Atlantic City provide daily news coverage of the township, as does WOBM-FM radio. The township provides material and commentary to The Southern Ocean Times, which also serves Barnegat Township, Lacey Township, Long Beach Island, Ocean Township (Waretown) and Tuckerton as one of seven weekly papers from Micromedia Publications.

== Transportation ==
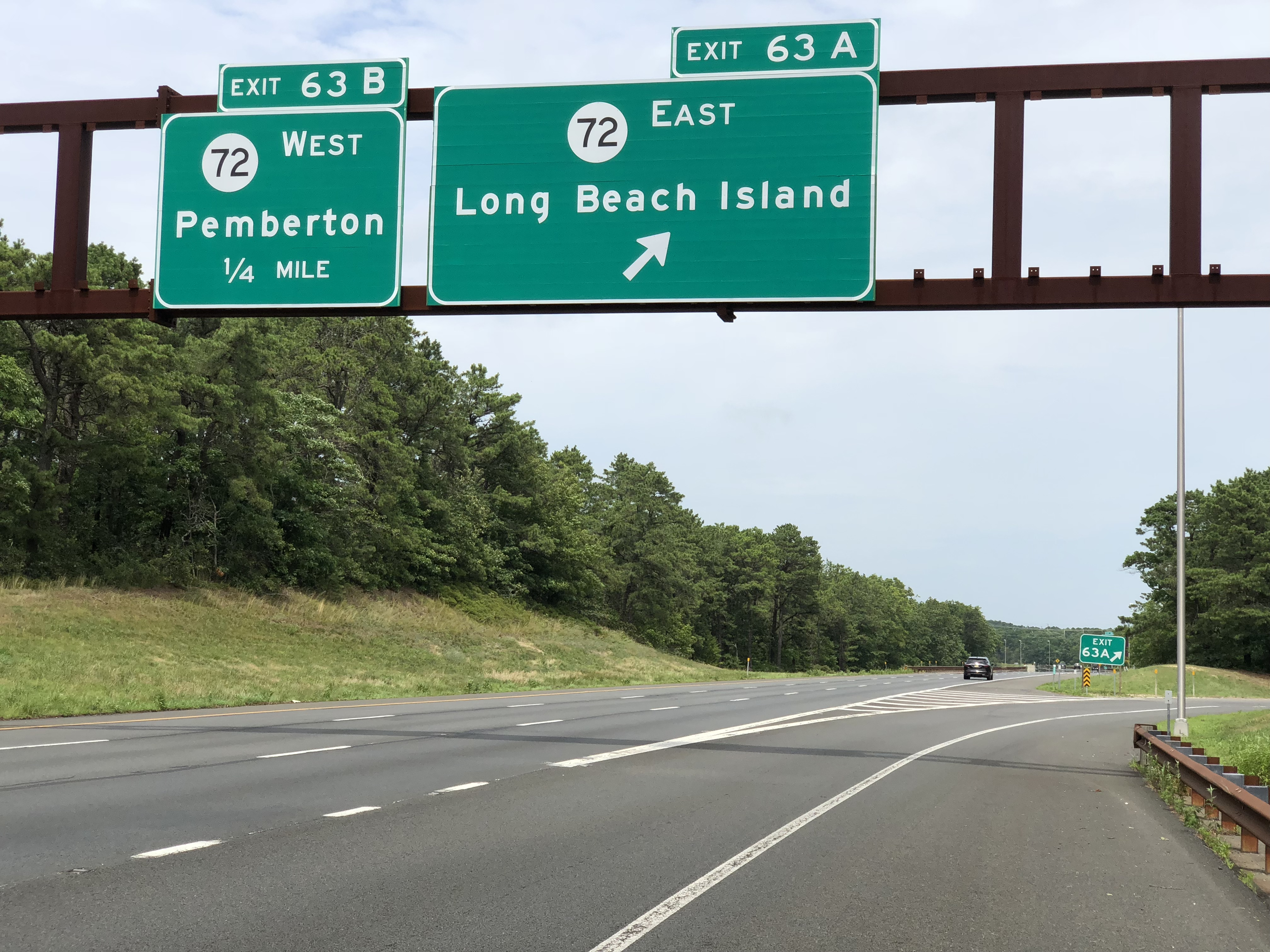
The northbound Garden State Parkway at the interchange with Route 72 in Stafford Township

=== Roads and highways ===
As of May 2010, the township had a total of 183.27 miles (294.94 km) of roadways, of which 143.29 miles (230.60 km) were maintained by the municipality, 20.06 miles (32.28 km) by Ocean County and 14.96 miles (24.08 km) by the New Jersey Department of Transportation and 4.96 miles (7.98 km) by the New Jersey Turnpike Authority.

Stafford is served by a few major roads. The most prominent of these is the Garden State Parkway, which enters the Stafford Township from Eagleswood Township in the south and exits northward into Barnegat Township. The Parkway intersects with Route 72 at Interchange 63 for Route 72 to Camden / Chatsworth / Manahawkin / Long Beach Island. In addition, U.S. Route 9 passes north–south through the center of the township and Route 72 passes from the northwest to the southeast. The most significant county road is CR 539, which traverses the western part of the township.

=== Public transportation ===
NJ Transit provides bus service to Atlantic City on the 559 bus route.

Ocean Ride local service is provided on the OC6 Little Egg Harbor – Stafford and the OC10 Long Beach Island routes.

== Notable people ==
People who were born in, residents of, or otherwise closely associated with Stafford Township include:

- Glenn Carson (born 1990), American football linebacker who played in the NFL for the Arizona Cardinals
- Doc Cramer (1905–1990), center fielder who played for four American League teams from 1929 to 1948
- Mike Gesicki (born 1995), tight end who plays for the Cincinnati Bengals
- Teresa Giudice (born 1972), reality television cast-member, best known for starring in The Real Housewives of New Jersey, who owned a summer home in the Beach Haven West section
- Clark Harris (born 1984), long snapper / tight end for the Cincinnati Bengals
- Paul Marshall Johnson Jr. (1955–2004), helicopter engineer who was beheaded in Saudi Arabia by a group connected to Al-Qaeda
- Kareem Rashad Sultan Khan (1987–2007), Muslim-American U.S. Army Specialist who died in Operation Iraqi Freedom
- William A. Newell (1817–1901), 18th Governor of New Jersey who later represented the state in the United States House of Representatives
- Martin Truex Jr. (born 1980), a NASCAR Cup Series driver who currently pilots Joe Gibbs Racing's #19 Toyota Camry and is the 2017 Monster Energy NASCAR Cup Series champion
- Martin Truex Sr. (1958–2025), former driver who competed in the Busch North Series
- Ryan Truex (born 1992), a NASCAR Xfinity Series driver who currently pilots Joe Gibbs Racing's #19 Toyota Supra part-time, having previously driven in the Truck Series and the Cup Series
- Ethan Vanacore-Decker (born 1994), professional soccer player for the Union Omaha in the United Soccer League
- Richard F. Visotcky (1929–2002), politician who served as mayor of Garfield, New Jersey and for 12 years as a member of the New Jersey General Assembly
