= Manahawkin, New Jersey =

Populated place in Ocean County, New Jersey, US

- Census-designated place
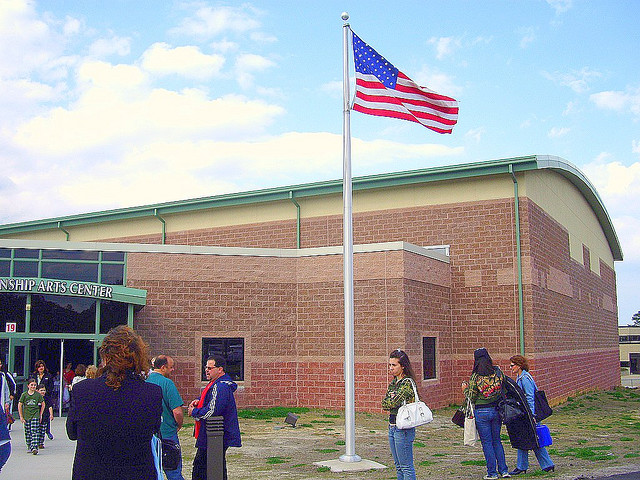
- The Stafford Performing Arts Center in Manahawkin

- Location of Manahawkin in Ocean County highlighted in red (left). Inset map: Location of Ocean County in New Jersey highlighted in orange (right).

- Location in Ocean County Location in New Jersey Location in the United States
- Coordinates: 39.693472°N 74.250229°W
- Country: United States
- State: New Jersey
- County: Ocean
- Township: Stafford

Area
  - Total: 1.94 sq mi (5.03 km^{2})
  - Land: 1.85 sq mi (4.78 km^{2})
  - Water: 0.097 sq mi (0.25 km^{2}) 4.98%
- Elevation: 23 ft (7 m)

Population (2020)
  - Total: 2,413
  - Density: 1,308.2/sq mi (505.09/km^{2})
- Time zone: UTC−05:00 (Eastern (EST))
  - Summer (DST): UTC−04:00 (Eastern (EDT))
- ZIP Code: 08050
- Area code: 609
- FIPS code: 34-42930
- GNIS feature ID: 02390114

Manahawkin is an unincorporated community and census-designated place (CDP) located within Stafford Township, in Ocean County, in the U.S. state of New Jersey. As of the 2020 United States census, the CDP's population was 2,413, its highest decennial count ever and an increase of 110 (+4.8%) from the 2,303 recorded at the 2010 census, which in turn had reflected an increase of 299 (+14.9%) from the 2,004 counted at the 2000 census. Manahawkin has been thought to be a Lenape word meaning "land of good corn", although this has been disputed by recent scholars claiming that it translates to "fertile land sloping into the water."

Manahawkin is the gateway to the resort communities on Long Beach Island, with Route 72 providing the sole road access, ending in Ship Bottom as it crosses Manahawkin Bay via the Manahawkin Bay Bridge (formally known as the Dorland J. Henderson Memorial Bridge).

== Geography ==
According to the United States Census Bureau, the CDP had a total area of 1.922 square miles (4.98 km^{2}), including 1.827 square miles (4.73 km^{2}) of it is land and 0.096 square miles (0.25 km^{2}) of water (4.98%) is water.

== Demographics ==
Historical population
Census	Pop.	Note	%±
1970	1,278		—
1980	1,469		14.9%
1990	1,594		8.5%
2000	2,004		25.7%
2010	2,303		14.9%
2020	2,413		4.8%
Population sources: 1950 1960 1970; 1980 1990 2000; 2010 2020

Manahawkin first appeared as an unincorporated community in the 1970 U.S. census; and then was listed as a census designated place in the 1980 U.S. census.

=== Racial and ethnic composition ===
Manahawkin CDP, New Jersey – Racial and ethnic composition Note: the US Census treats Hispanic/Latino as an ethnic category. This table excludes Latinos from the racial categories and assigns them to a separate category. Hispanics/Latinos may be of any race.
Race / Ethnicity (NH = Non-Hispanic)	Pop 2000	Pop 2010	Pop 2020	% 2000	% 2010	% 2020
White alone (NH)	1,914	2,030	1,903	95.51%	88.15%	78.86%
Black or African American alone (NH)	1	10	25	0.05%	0.43%	1.04%
Native American or Alaska Native alone (NH)	2	1	0	0.10%	0.04%	0.00%
Asian alone (NH)	29	58	33	1.45%	2.52%	1.37%
Native Hawaiian or Pacific Islander alone (NH)	0	0	0	0.00%	0.00%	0.00%
Other race alone (NH)	0	1	3	0.00%	0.04%	0.12%
Mixed race or Multiracial (NH)	20	13	62	1.00%	0.56%	2.57%
Hispanic or Latino (any race)	38	190	387	1.90%	8.25%	16.04%
Total	2,004	2,303	2,413	100.00%	100.00%	100.00%

=== 2020 census ===
As of the 2020 census, Manahawkin had a population of 2,413. The median age was 44.0 years. 21.0% of residents were under the age of 18 and 19.9% of residents were 65 years of age or older. For every 100 females there were 92.0 males, and for every 100 females age 18 and over there were 88.5 males age 18 and over.

100.0% of residents lived in urban areas, while 0.0% lived in rural areas.

There were 959 households in Manahawkin, of which 29.4% had children under the age of 18 living in them. Of all households, 49.1% were married-couple households, 15.8% were households with a male householder and no spouse or partner present, and 28.6% were households with a female householder and no spouse or partner present. About 29.0% of all households were made up of individuals and 16.6% had someone living alone who was 65 years of age or older.

There were 1,101 housing units, of which 12.9% were vacant. The homeowner vacancy rate was 2.8% and the rental vacancy rate was 1.7%.

=== 2010 census ===
The 2010 United States census counted 2,303 people, 931 households, and 586 families in the CDP. The population density was 1,260.7 people per square mile (486.8 people/km^{2}). There were 1,071 housing units at an average density of 586.3 units per square mile (226.4 units/km^{2}). The racial makeup was 91.58% (2,109) White, 0.43% (10) Black or African American, 0.43% (10) Native American, 2.52% (58) Asian, 0.00% (0) Pacific Islander, 4.17% (96) from other races, and 0.87% (20) from two or more races. Hispanic or Latino of any race were 8.25% (190) of the population.

Of the 931 households, 25.5% had children under the age of 18; 46.6% were married couples living together; 11.6% had a female householder with no husband present and 37.1% were non-families. Of all households, 30.9% were made up of individuals and 19.2% had someone living alone who was 65 years of age or older. The average household size was 2.47 and the average family size was 3.06.

20.0% of the population were under the age of 18, 8.5% from 18 to 24, 25.1% from 25 to 44, 29.2% from 45 to 64, and 17.3% who were 65 years of age or older. The median age was 42.7 years. For every 100 females, the population had 87.8 males. For every 100 females ages 18 and older there were 88.4 males.

=== 2000 census ===
As of the 2000 United States census there were 2,004 people, 757 households, and 555 families living in the CDP. The population density was 425.1 people/km^{2} (1,101 people/mi^{2}). There were 827 housing units at an average density of 175.4 units/km^{2} (454 units/mi^{2}). The racial makeup of the CDP was 96.86% White, 0.05% African American, 0.10% Native American, 1.45% Asian, 0.55% from other races, and 1.00% from two or more races. Hispanic or Latino of any race were 1.90% of the population.

There were 757 households, out of which 30.5% had children under the age of 18 living with them, 56.4% were married couples living together, 12.8% had a female householder with no husband present, and 26.6% were non-families. 21.7% of all households were made up of individuals, and 10.8% had someone living alone who was 65 years of age or older. The average household size was 2.56 and the average family size was 2.97.

In the CDP the population was spread out, with 22.9% under the age of 18, 6.9% from 18 to 24, 26.8% from 25 to 44, 25.6% from 45 to 64, and 17.8% who were 65 years of age or older. The median age was 41 years. For every 100 females, there were 86.9 males. For every 100 females age 18 and over, there were 86.9 males.

The median income for a household in the CDP was $59,663, and the median income for a family was $62,702. Males had a median income of $53,396 versus $24,688 for females. The per capita income for the CDP was $22,875. About 1.4% of families and 3.4% of the population were below the poverty line, including 1.7% of those under age 18 and 14.7% of those age 65 or over.

== Education ==
For grades K through 6, public school students attend the schools of the Stafford Township School District. For grades 7 through 12, students attend the schools of the Southern Regional School District.

Students also have the option of attending the Marine Academy of Technology and Environmental Science, a specialized high school operated by the Ocean County Vocational Technical School that is located in Manahawkin and focuses on marine and environmental sciences.

St. Mary Academy, a K-8 school of the Roman Catholic Diocese of Trenton, is in Stafford Township, near Manahawkin CDP. It is managed by St. Mary Church of Barnegat. From 1997, until 2019 it operated as All Saints Regional Catholic School and was collectively managed by five churches. In 2019 St. Mary took entire control of the school, which remained on the same Manahawkin campus, and changed its name. The other churches no longer operate the school but still may send students there.

== Transportation ==
NJ Transit provides bus service to Atlantic City on the 559 bus route.

== Media ==
The Asbury Park Press and The Press of Atlantic City provide daily news coverage of the township, as does WOBM-FM radio. The township provides material and commentary to The Southern Ocean Times, which also serves Barnegat Township, Lacey Township, Long Beach Island, Ocean Township (Waretown) and Tuckerton as one of seven weekly papers from Micromedia Publications.

== Notable people ==
People who were born in, residents of, or otherwise closely associated with Manahawkin include:

- Glenn Carson (born 1990), American football linebacker who played in the NFL for the Arizona Cardinals.
- Doc Cramer (1905–1990), center fielder who played for four American League teams from 1929 to 1948.
- Mike Gesicki (born 1995), tight end who plays for the Cincinnati Bengals.
- Clark Harris (born 1984), long snapper for the Cincinnati Bengals who played college football at Rutgers University.
- William A. Newell (1817–1901), Governor of New Jersey who represented the state in the United States House of Representatives.
- Ethan Vanacore-Decker (born 1994), professional soccer player for the Union Omaha in the United Soccer League.
