= Greg Myhre =

American politician

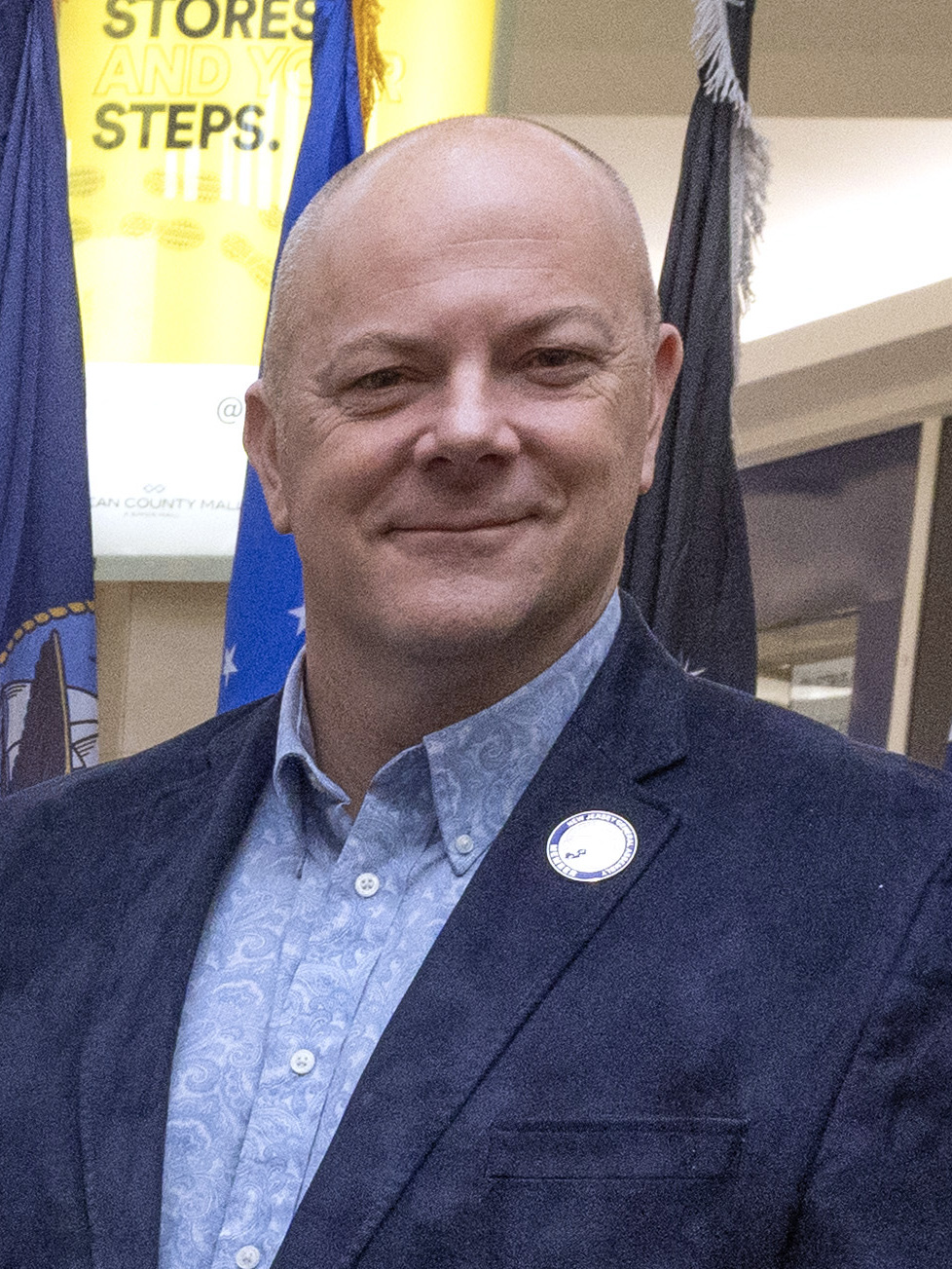
- Myhre in 2025

Member of the New Jersey General Assembly from the 9th district
- Incumbent
- Assumed office January 9, 2024 Serving with Brian E. Rumpf
- Preceded by: DiAnne Gove

Personal details
- Party: Republican
- Education: University of Maryland, College Park (BS); Pennsylvania State University (GrCert)
- Website: State Assembly website

Gregory E. Myhre is an American realtor and Republican Party politician serving as a member of the New Jersey General Assembly for the 9th legislative district, having taken office on January 9, 2024.

== Biography ==
Myhre has been a resident of Stafford Township, New Jersey, and served as the township's mayor.

== Elective office ==
Incumbent DiAnne Gove decided not to run in the June 2023 primary, after Myhre defeated Gove at the 2023 Ocean County Republican Convention 67-56 . Rumpf and Myhre defeated Democrats Joseph Atura and Sarah 'Sally' Collins in the 2023 New Jersey General Assembly election.

=== District 9 ===
Each of the 40 districts in the New Jersey Legislature has one representative in the New Jersey Senate and two members in the New Jersey General Assembly. The representatives from the 9th District for the 2024—2025 Legislative Session are:

- Senator Carmen Amato (R)
- Assemblyman Greg Myhre (R)
- Assemblyman Brian E. Rumpf (R)

== Electoral history ==
9th Legislative District General Election, 2023
Party	Candidate	Votes	%
Republican	Brian E. Rumpf (incumbent)	37,559	34.0
Republican	Greg Myhre	36,342	32.9
Democratic	Sarah Collins	18,374	16.6
Democratic	Joseph Atura	17,205	15.6
Green	Barry Bendar	979	0.8
Total votes		110,459	100.0
Republican hold			
Republican hold			
