= Long Beach Island =

Barrier island in Ocean County, New Jersey, US

Coordinates: 39.639835°N 74.181619°W

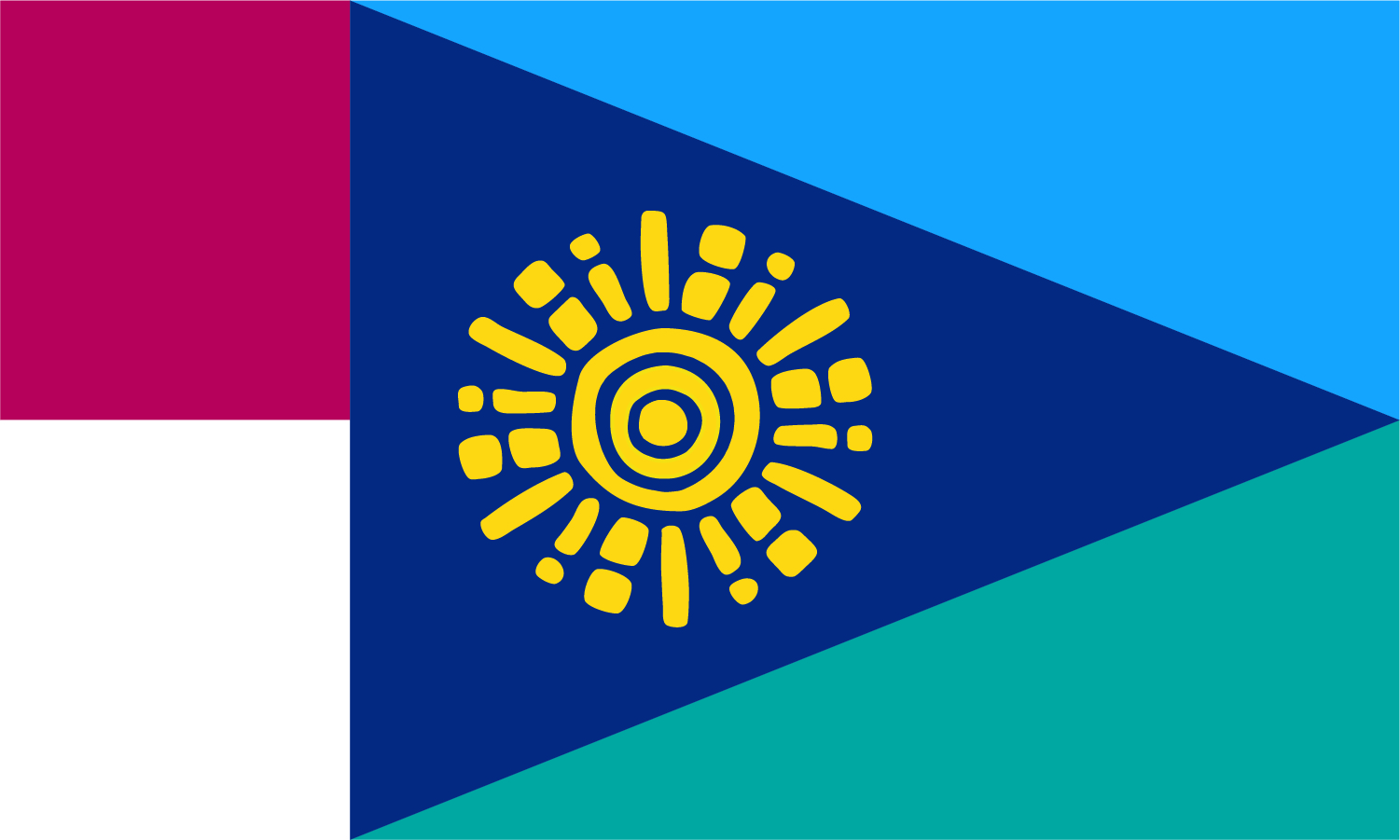
Unofficial flag of LBI created in 2023.

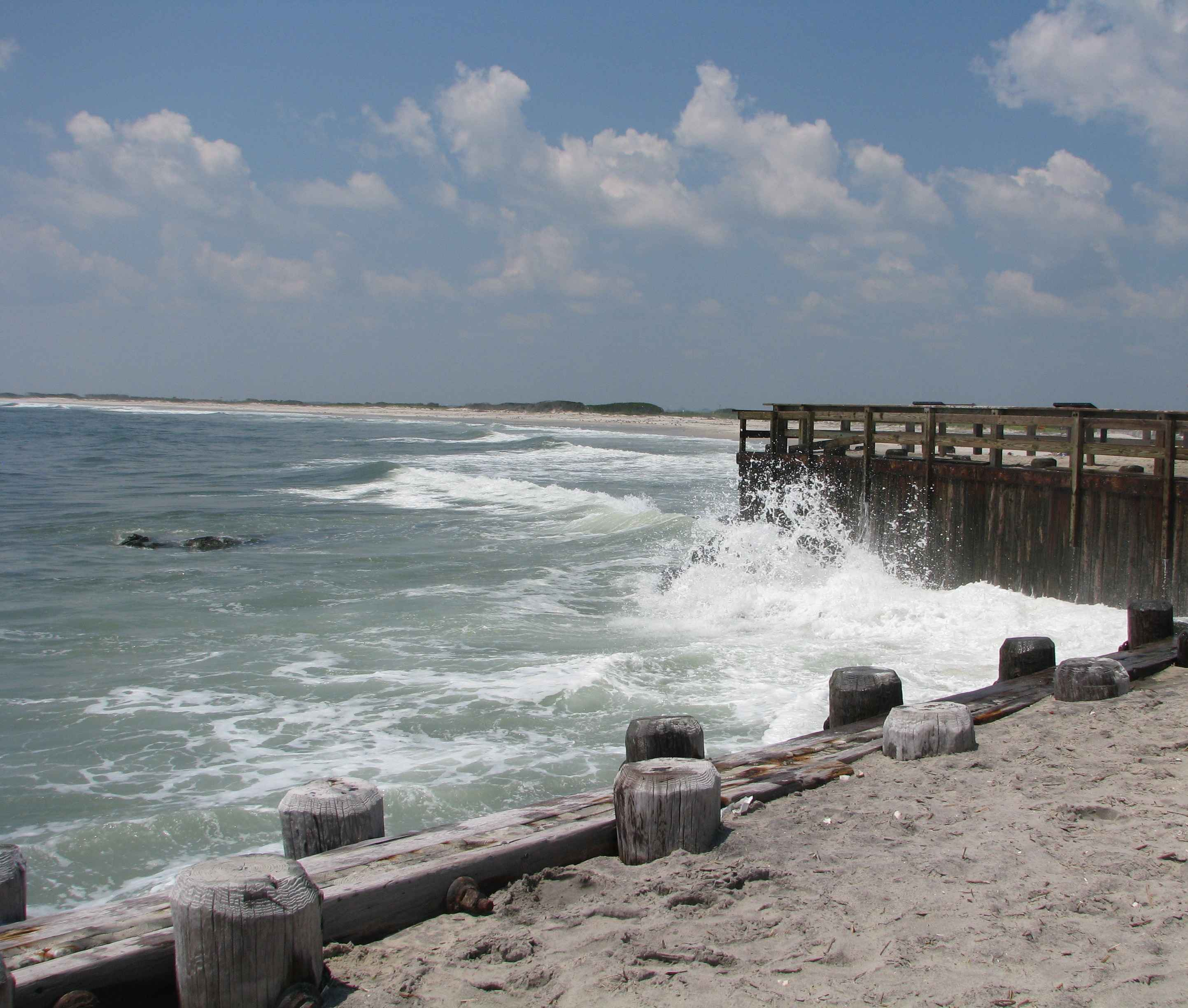
Holgate Beach, part of the Edwin B. Forsythe National Wildlife Refuge, managed by the U.S. Fish and Wildlife Service, is situated at the southern tip of Long Beach Island, within Long Beach Township, Ocean County, New Jersey, U.S., on the Jersey Shore.

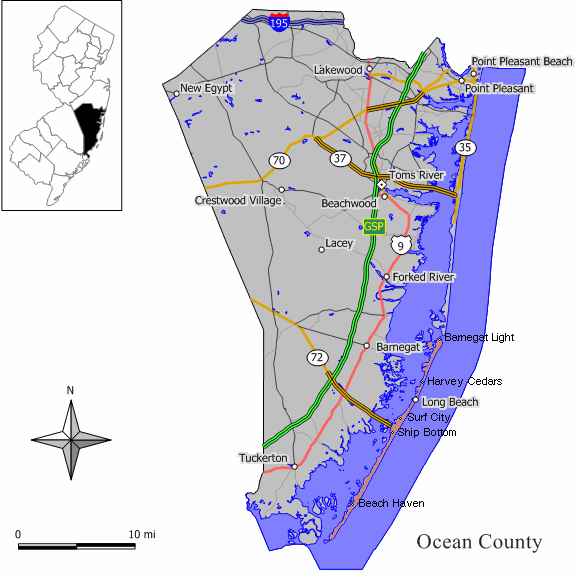
Position of Long Beach Island (pink) relative to Ocean County

Long Beach Island (colloquially known as LBI, The LBI Region, or simply The Island) is a barrier island and summer colony along the Atlantic Ocean coast of Ocean County, New Jersey, United States, on the Jersey Shore. Aligned north to south, the northern portion generally has more expensive low-density housing, whereas the southern portion possesses higher-density housing and considerable commercial development. Long Beach Island is 1–2 miles away from Mainland New Jersey. The primary industries include tourism, fishing, and real estate. The only access point to the island by land is a single causeway. The island is the southernmost point of the New York Metropolitan Area.

The island is home to about 10,000 people on a year-round basis. The population is distributed among six separate municipalities, the largest of which is Long Beach Township. However, the island's population swells significantly during the summer months and reaches about 100,000 people, including part-time residents and tourists, who are often referred to as "shoobies". The island's close-knit communities are largely affluent and contain vacation homes for wealthy individuals who reside elsewhere, primarily New Jersey as well as New York, Pennsylvania, and Connecticut.

The island and its properties and economy are expected to be severely affected by sea level rise. By 2013, sea level had increased by six inches and is expected to rise at least another six inches by 2030. Most projections suggest over a meter of sea level rise by 2100 and would require significant climate change adaptation to survive, making both property protection and an engineered retreat economically unattractive.

== Geography ==
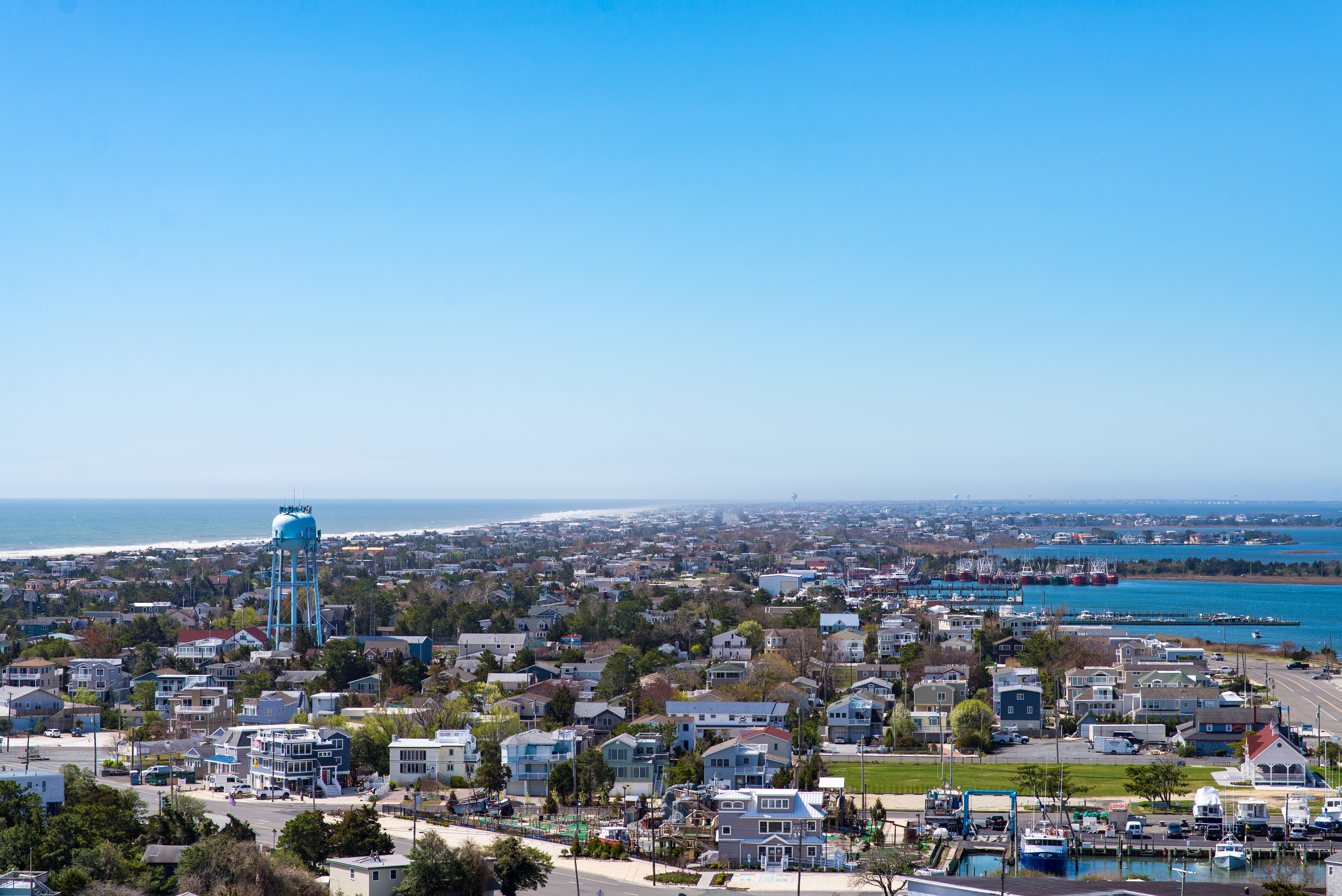
View southwards over Barnegat Light and the island

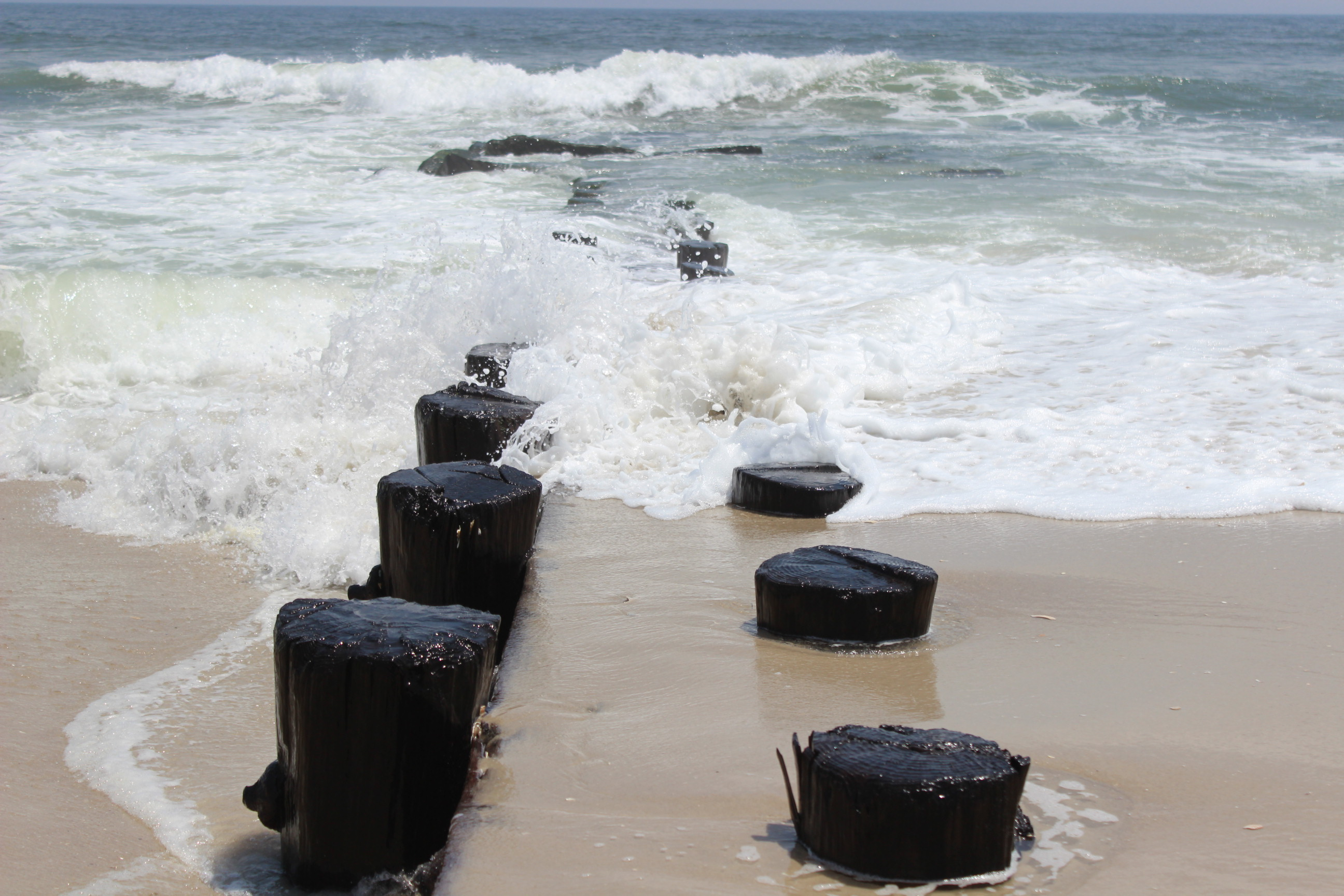
Afternoon surf

Long Beach Island is located 24 miles (39 km) north of Atlantic City 61 miles (98 km) east-southeast of Philadelphia and 101 miles (163 km) south of New York City. LBI is approximately 18 miles (29 km) in length, which includes three miles (4.8 km) of marsh protected as part of Edwin B. Forsythe National Wildlife Refuge located on the southern tip. The island is about a half-mile wide (800 m) at its widest point in Ship Bottom, and spans one-fifth of a mile (320 m) at its narrowest point in Harvey Cedars.

Long Beach Island is bisected by State Route 72, formerly "South 40", which connects the mainland to the island at Ship Bottom. It is the sole access point for road vehicles to the mainland over Manahawkin Bay. This results in the division of the island into a northern portion and a southern portion. From the bridge northward, the island includes the communities of Surf City, North Beach (a section of Long Beach Township), Harvey Cedars, Loveladies (a section of Long Beach Township), High Bar Harbor (the northernmost section of Long Beach Township), and Barnegat Light. From the bridge southward, the island includes the communities of Ship Bottom, North Beach Haven (a census-designated place in Long Beach Township that includes Brant Beach and Beach Haven Gardens), Beach Haven, and the Holgate section of Long Beach Township at the southernmost tip of the island.

== History ==
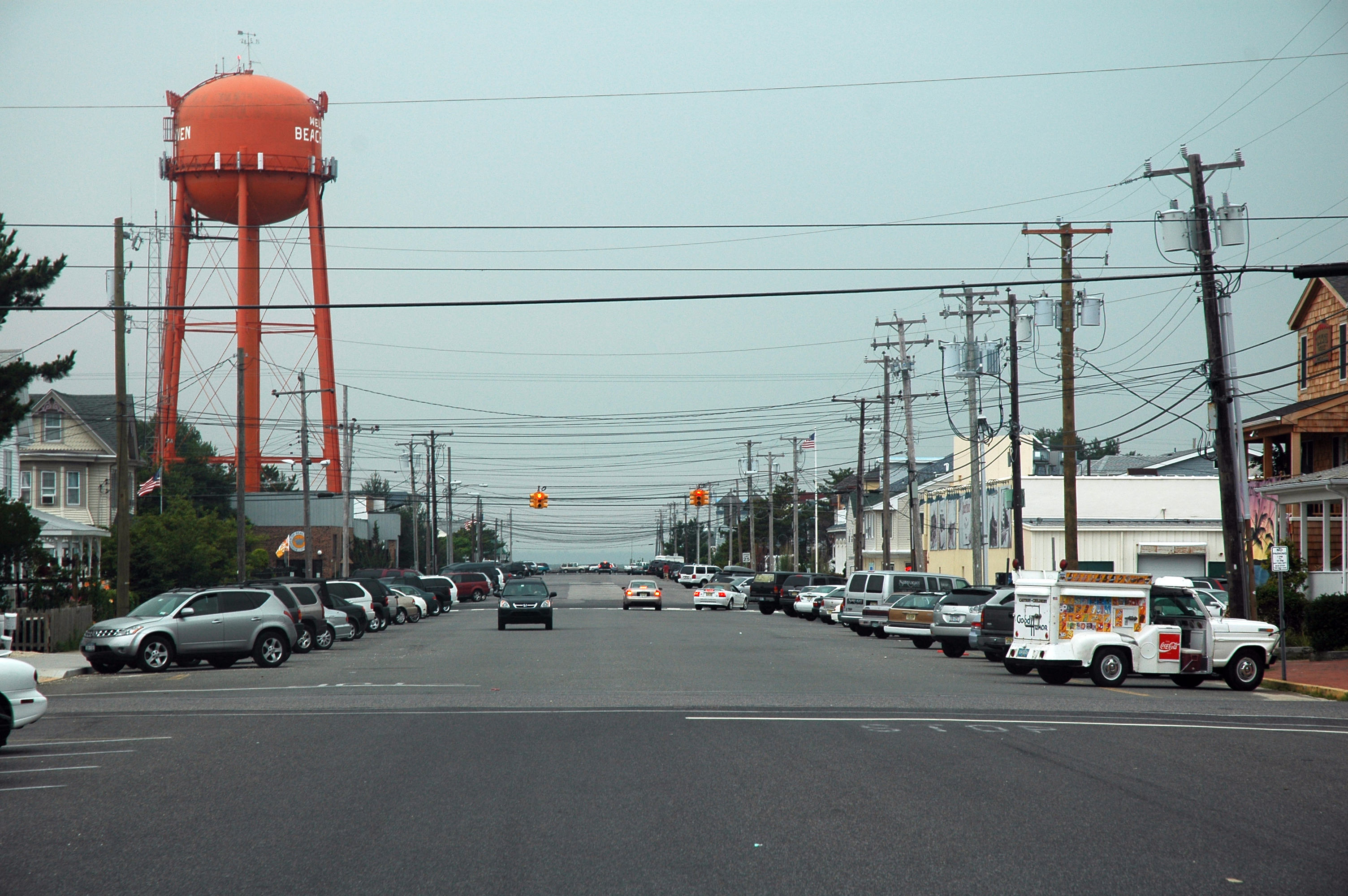
Engleside Avenue in Beach Haven

The Lenape people were the original inhabitants of Long Beach Island, utilizing the island primarily as a summer retreat for fishing and clamming due to its abundant natural resources in the early 1600s. It wasn't until the 1690s, when the island became continuously settled on, initially by hunters and Europeans. Barnegat Inlet, to the north of the island, was an important path for freight shipments and whaling from the 17th century through the 20th century. Due to the inlet's importance and its turbulent waters, a lighthouse tower was constructed in 1835 to guide shippers through the area. Still, it was inadequate to ships, constantly being mistaken for another passing ship because the light was fixed. Erosion problems destroyed the tower in 1857, two years before the current Barnegat Lighthouse was completed in 1859, flashing at each compass point every 10 seconds. It was constructed by the United States Army Corps of Engineers under the supervision of George Gordon Meade, famous for leading the Union forces to victory four years later during the Civil War at the Battle of Gettysburg. The United States Life-Saving Service built Station #17 in Barnegat Light (then known as Brownsville) around 1872, which continues today as a United States Coast Guard station.

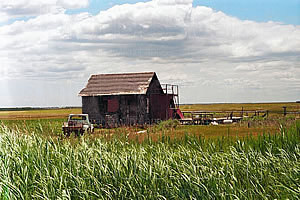
A lone fishing shack, a landmark to drivers entering LBI, stood dilapidated in the marsh alongside Route 72 until it was destroyed in Hurricane Sandy in 2012.

A developing tourism sector prompted the Tuckerton Railroad (a short line running from Tuckerton to Whiting) to build a bridge across Barnegat bay that ran from Barnegat city to Beach Haven; the tracks were completed in 1886 and were leased to the Pennsylvania Railroad (PRR). The Jersey Shore shark attacks of 1916 included a fatal attack in Beach Haven, killing University of Pennsylvania student Charles Vansant in July 1916, which partly inspired the book Jaws. A severe winter storm in 1920 destroyed most of the beaches along the island, several hotels, and reopening the new inlet in Holgate. A storm in 1923 further diminished the tourism sector, resulting in the discontinuation of train service to Barnegat City between 1923 and 1926. In 1935, the railroad bridge to the mainland washed out, leaving the entire island without rail service.

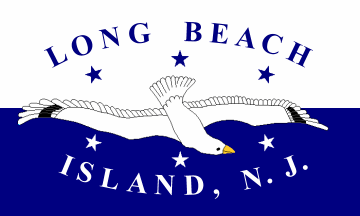
Old unofficial flag of LBI, created c.1970 and used until 2023.

Several storms throughout the island's history have resulted in the island being split in two, with the division occurring at the island's narrowest point in Harvey Cedars. The most famous of such storms was the Ash Wednesday Storm of 1962, which split Long Beach Island into numerous pieces and nearly destroyed the island in its entirety. The storm caused the destroyer USS Monssen to run aground in Beach Haven Inlet, Long Beach Township. The existing Route 72 Causeway was erected in the late 1950s, which replaced a low-level two-lane automobile bridge which in itself had replaced the previously destroyed railroad bridge.

=== Hurricane Sandy ===
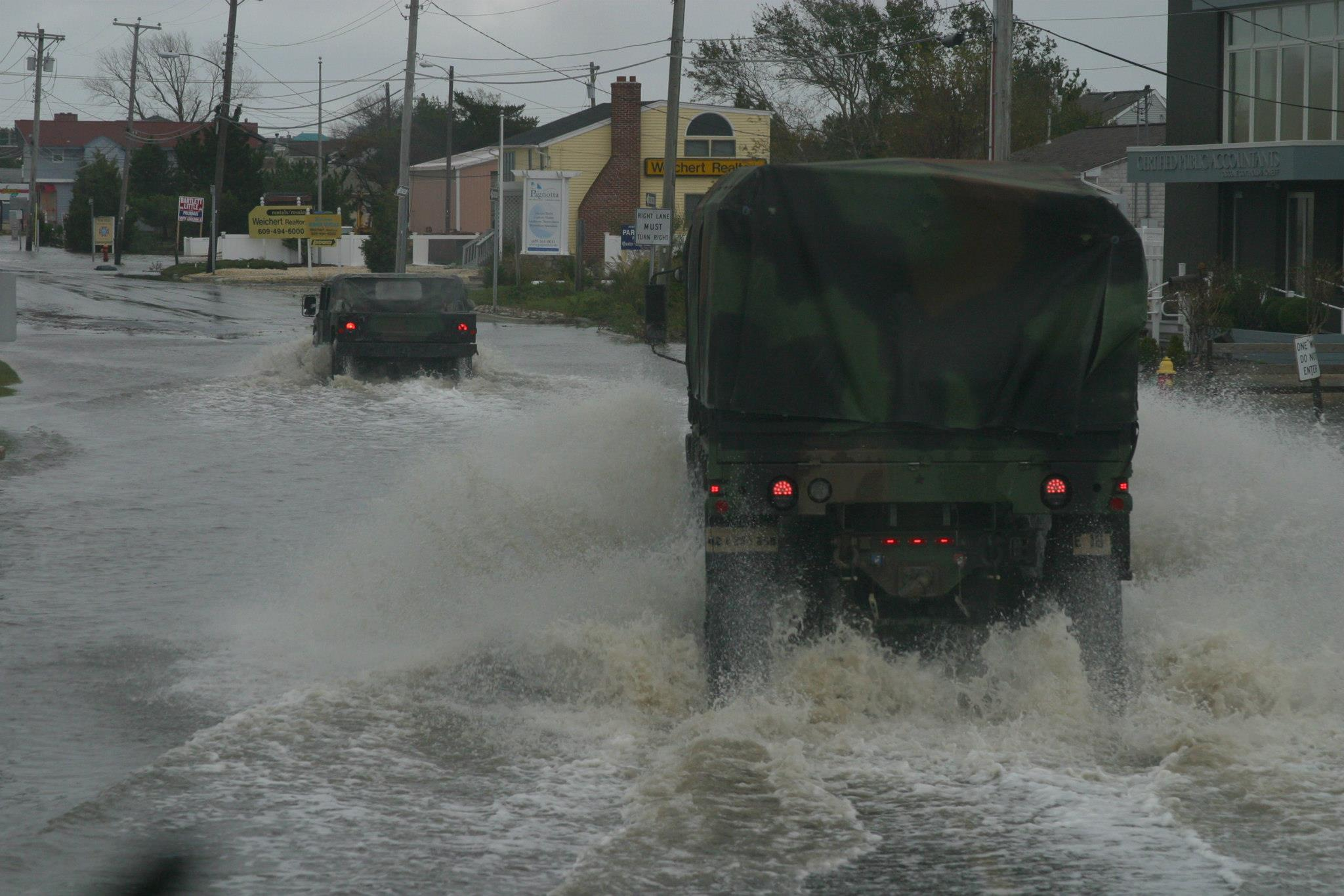
New Jersey National Guard vehicles navigating floodwaters along Route 72 in Ship Bottom during Hurricane Sandy

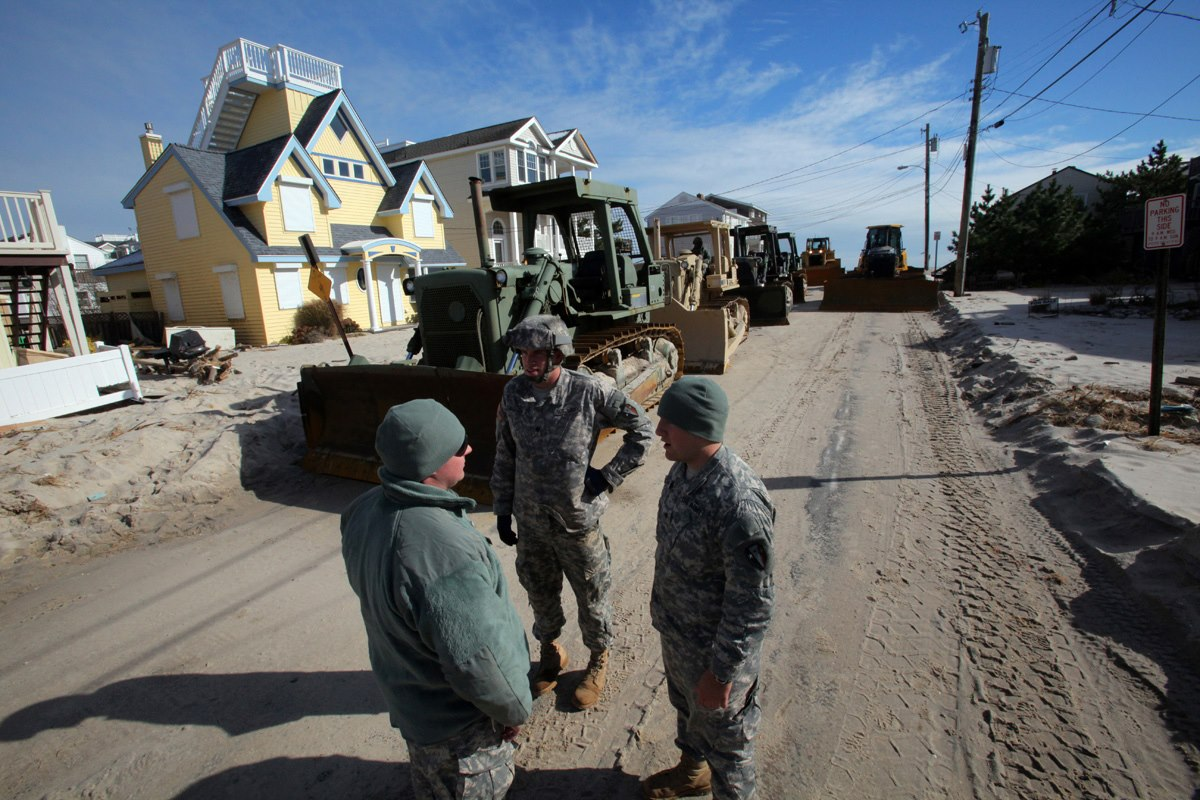
New Jersey National Guard workers clearing sand from streets in Holgate after Hurricane Sandy

In late October 2012, portions of Long Beach Island were significantly damaged by Hurricane Sandy. Residents were evacuated, and portions of the island were severely flooded, with the ocean meeting the bay in isolated spots. Streets were left covered with up to four feet of sand in some spots. The nine-foot storm surge and 18-foot seas that pounded the barrier island damaged several homes along the ocean and bayfront communities.

The Manahawkin Bay Bridge remained closed to residents for a full 13 days following the storm. Locals were prohibited from returning to the island except for brief visits to retrieve belongings. Bulldozers and front-end loaders moved hundreds of tons of sand, along with power lines and boats, in an attempt to make the roadways passable. Long Beach Island was finally re-opened to residents and building owners on November 10, with the exception of the Holgate section of Long Beach Township, where infrastructure and road damage was still too dangerous. However, island officials warned that some areas were still without sewerage, water and electric service at that time.

Damage was distributed unevenly throughout the island. Areas with a protective dune system had limited damage, while areas without dunes or where dunes were breached received significantly more damage. In those neighborhoods — in sections like Holgate, on the island's southern tip — destruction was severe. The protective dunes, an ambitious project developed by the U.S. Army Corps of Engineers, have been a source of controversy in recent years and have led to conflict between local officials arguing for the need of dunes and property owners who felt that the dunes devalued their property. As such, the work is incomplete and there are significant breaks in the dune system. Other hard-hit areas included Loveladies and North Beach. Areas where the dune system was in place fared much better, such as Harvey Cedars, Ship Bottom, Surf City and Barnegat Light.

Electricity was restored to 70% of the Island by November 4, 2012. By November 20, 2012, natural gas service was restored to nearly the entire Island.

By mid-November, many businesses were re-opened on Long Beach Island with life resuming as normal for much of the Island by mid-December.

== Demographics ==
There are six separate municipalities on Long Beach Island. Long Beach Township is the largest of these, and subdivides into multiple neighborhoods:

- Barnegat Light
- Beach Haven
- Harvey Cedars
- Long Beach Township
  - Brant Beach
  - Beach Haven Crest
  - Beach Haven Gardens
  - Beach Haven Inlet
  - Beach Haven Park
  - Beach Haven Terrace
  - Brighton Beach
  - Haven Beach
  - High Bar Harbor
  - Holgate
  - Loveladies
  - North Beach Haven
  - North Beach
  - Peahala Park
  - South Beach Haven
  - Spray Beach
- Ship Bottom
- Surf City
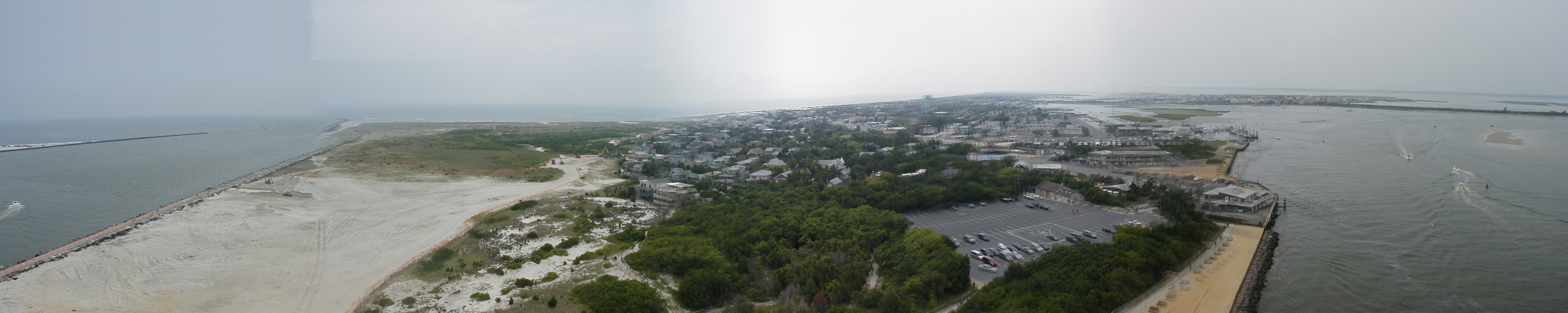
Looking south from Barnegat Lighthouse in Barnegat Light, New Jersey

== Culture ==
In the 1970s, an article in Philadelphia Magazine quipped that, "The haves turn right (south) and the have mores turn left (north)," referring to the option of turning right or left when arriving on the island from the bridge. Nominally accurate, the low-density northern end of the island, Loveladies, North Beach, and the surrounding neighborhoods are home to an assortment of large-scale waterfront homes which attract considerable attention from visitors and are often the source of rumors regarding vacationing celebrities during the summertime. The southern community of Beach Haven features historic and elegant Victorian homes that have survived the many storms. The south end contains significantly more commercial zoning, which generally decreases north of the bridge. Year-round residents and businesses in operation are more common toward the southern end of the island, particularly in the larger boroughs of Beach Haven and Ship Bottom.

Long Beach Island typically attracts a family-oriented crowd during the summertime, unlike more frenzied beach vacation destinations such as Belmar and Seaside Heights. The island has not contained a boardwalk since the one in Beach Haven was washed away by the 1944 hurricane, and the nightlife is limited to a few bars. Visitors generally participate in activities such as miniature golf, parasailing, jet-skiing, walking, shopping, and relaxing on the beaches. The island has a reputation as a base for many long-range recreational fishing and charter boats, whose trips can range from 10 to 100 miles (16 to 161 km) from one of the island's two inlets (at Barnegat Light in the north and Beach Haven in the south.) In 2009, the Lighthouse International Film Festival was launched on the island. The three-day event screens films in venues throughout the island. Other art venues include the Surflight Theatre in Beach Haven and numerous art galleries throughout the island. The Surflight Theatre was closed due to foreclosure but has now reopened with plans to expand the number of shows presented yearly.

=== Beach replenishment ===
Some of the island's 18 miles (29 km) of beaches have experienced significant erosion in recent decades, threatening the multimillion-dollar waterfront homes in the area. In 2005, with the help of the Army Corps of Engineers, work began on a $75 million project to build a 22-foot (6.7 m) high, 30-foot (9.1 m) wide dune the length of the island using sand pumped from offshore. In front of the dunes, a 200-foot (61 m) wide stretch of sand separates the dune from the ocean. The beach replenishment project began in Ship Bottom and Surf City. With work on those beaches now complete, the project continues toward the northern end of the island. Beach replenishment has been a hugely controversial topic. Many surfers and swimmers argue that pumping the sand destroys the sandbars that create waves and provide a better swimming environment. Some homeowners claim dunes will reduce property value, while island officials argue dunes are necessary to counter beach erosion and protect the island from storms.

== Transportation ==
Bisecting the developed region is the sole access point for road vehicles, via State Route 72, which consists of the Dorland J. Henderson Memorial Bridge (locally known as "The Causeway", though the term is incorrect in its application). The bridge is known for its "String of Pearls", a row of lights mounted on the railings lining the length of the bridge. The bridge was designed by an African American, New Jersey Department of Transportation engineer, Dorland J. Henderson who also designed the unique bridge lights. The bridge extends from Manahawkin on the mainland to Ship Bottom on the island. The island can also be reached by water transport. A $155-million plan unveiled by the New Jersey Department of Transportation in 2005 added a second span and will replace the existing bridge.

The new southern span was opened in 2016 and the original bridge was built over the following three years, with the project finishing in 2019.

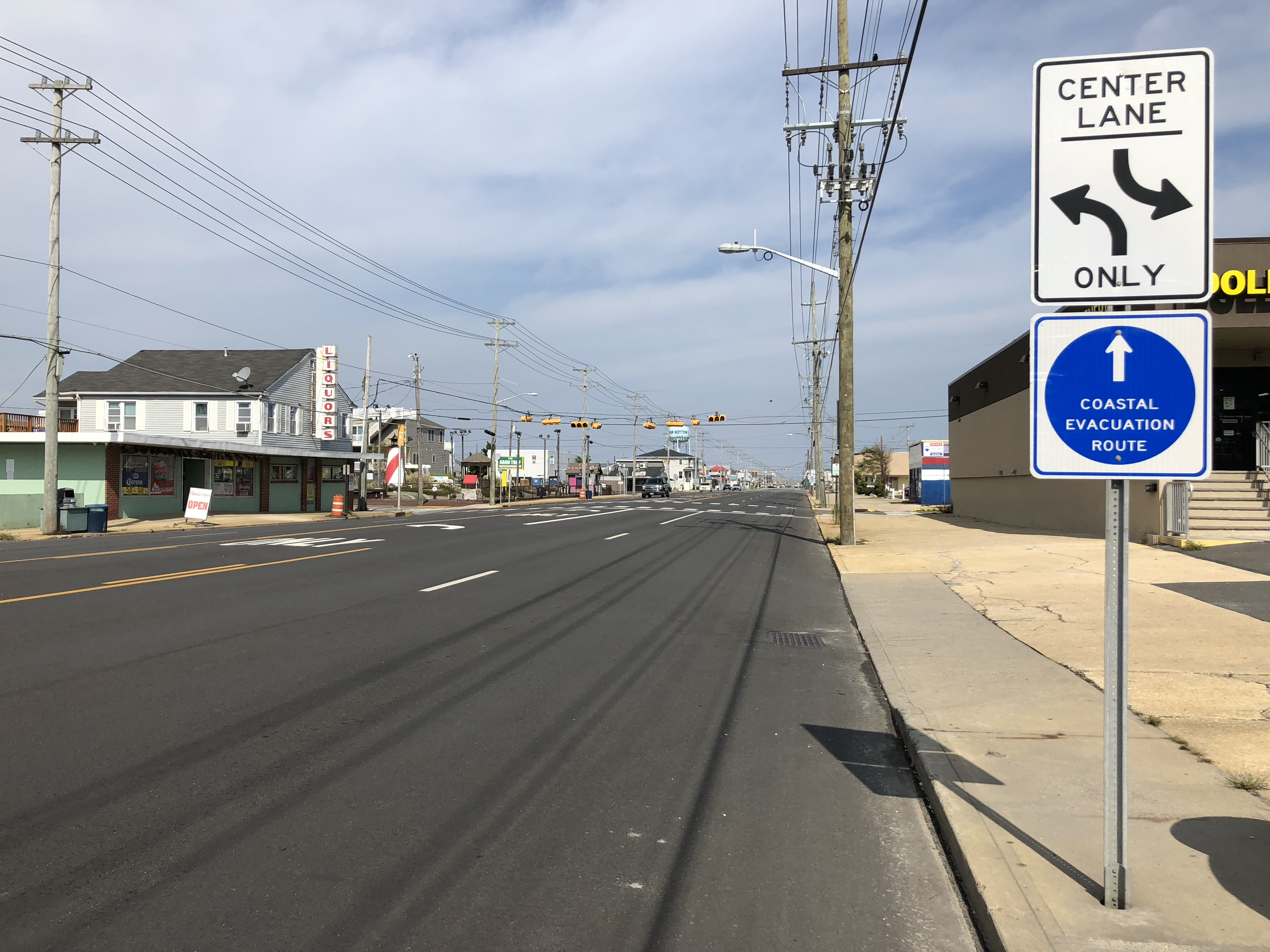
County Route 607 in Ship Bottom

Within the island, one road forms the backbone of all transportation: County Route 607. This road, which is known as Bay Avenue in Beach Haven, Central Avenue and Broadway in Barnegat Light, and Long Beach Boulevard across the remainder of the island, runs the length of LBI and connects all the separate municipalities on the island as well as the separate sections of Long Beach Township.

For public transit, NJ Transit Bus 559 Lakewood-Atlantic City runs to Manahawkin. Ocean Ride local service is provided on the OC9 Long Beach Island route.

TransportAzumah offers daily service during the summer season between Midtown Manhattan in New York City and Long Beach Island with a stop at Newark Liberty International Airport.

The LBI Shuttle runs the 18-mile length of the island on Long Beach Boulevard. It provides $2 service from 10am to 10pm and $5 service from 10pm to close. It serves the Long Beach Island municipalities / communities of Barnegat Light, Loveladies, Harvey Cedars, North Beach, Surf City, Ship Bottom, Long Beach Township, Beach Haven and Holgate.

== Notable locations ==
Barnegat Lighthouse on the north tip of Long Beach Island

The historic Barnegat Lighthouse is located in Barnegat Lighthouse State Park at the northern tip of the island, along the Barnegat Inlet. The conical tower stands 165 feet (50 m) tall, and the park includes several trails through native foliage and along the jetty constructed in the 1990s. The scallop boat Lindsay L, docked near Viking Village in Barnegat Light, was used in the movie The Perfect Storm. The lighthouse is open daily from 10 AM to 4:30 PM (weather permitting) from Memorial Day through Labor Day. There is a $3 fee per person to enter the lighthouse from Memorial Day through Labor Day. Children ages 6 to 11 are $1, and children ages 5 and under are free and must be accompanied by an adult. Visitors can also catch the views from the top without climbing the 217 steps, thanks to four cameras that transmit live images of the view to a display in the adjacent Interpretive Center.

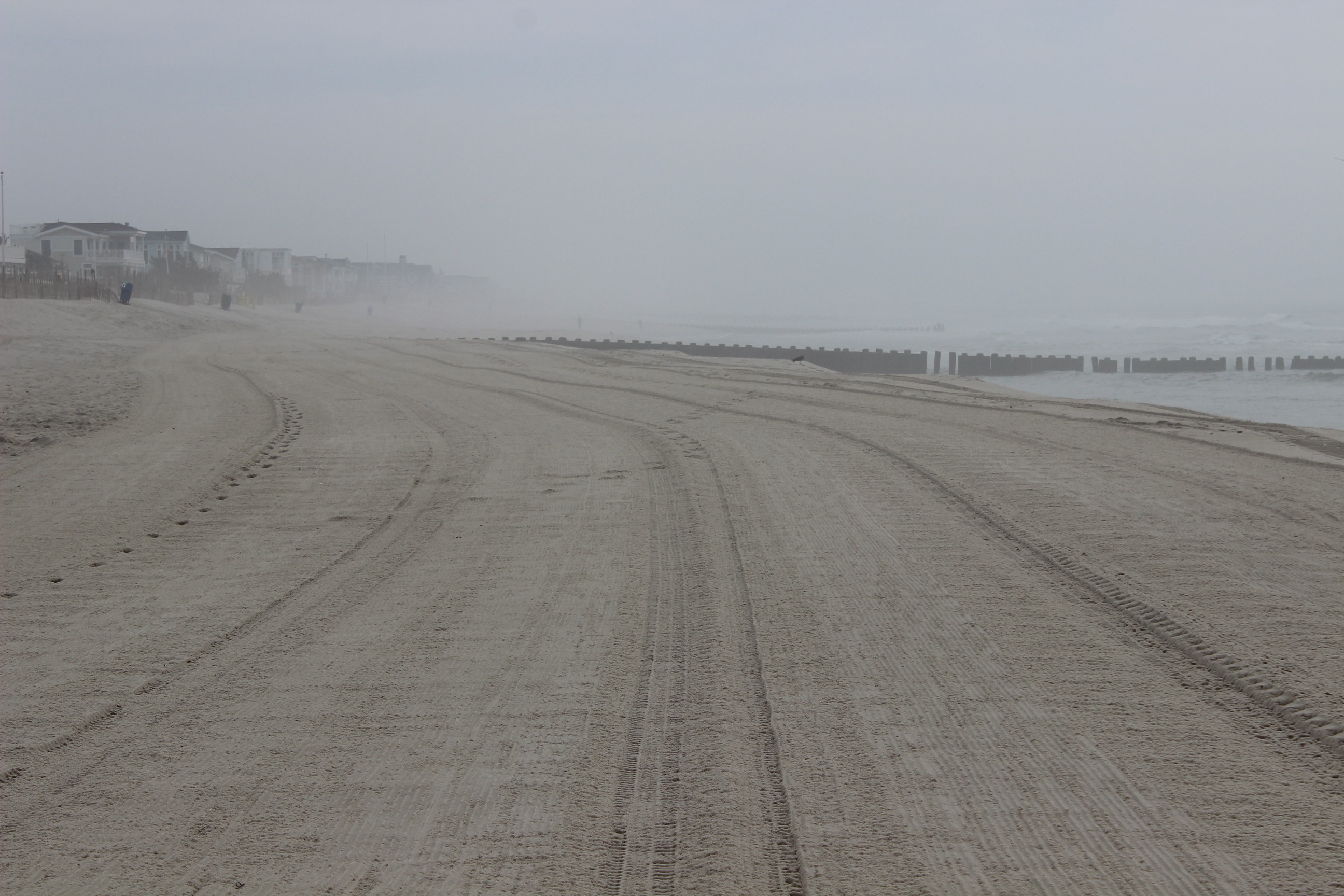
Dawn on the beach

Loveladies is home to the Long Beach Island Foundation of the Arts and Sciences, established in 1948 by artist Boris Blai. The organization provides arts, science and recreation programs to area residents and visitors. The foundation offers an After School Arts Education Program to area schools, an Artists Residency and Retreat Program for New Jersey Artists, Visiting Artists in Ceramics during the summer season, and ceramics scholarships and residency opportunities.

To the south, in Beach Haven, the Fantasy Island Amusement Park is the only full-time location on the island with standard-fare amusement rides (including a classically designed carousel). Fantasy Island offers rides, games, food, live entertainment, and a family-style casino arcade. Entertainment, admission, and parking are free. The annual Festival Of The Sea carnival also makes an appearance at the St. Francis Community Church in Brant Beach every August for one week per year. Lucille's Oh Fudge! Candies has a large salt water taffy display in front of its shop in Brant Beach, a candy that was first created in nearby Atlantic City. Lucille's candy also has a location on Route 72 in Manahawkin. Thundering Surf Water Park, the island's only water park, offers fun for all ages. With six water slides, a kids' area, a lazy river, miniature golf, and a Flow House, the water park is a popular attraction for families.

Two significant commercial establishments are Schooner's Wharf/Bay Village, in Beach Haven, and Viking Village, in Barnegat Light. The latter includes numerous family-owned shops generally oriented toward the local fishing industry and the many fishing charter boats that set sail there, though a variety of handmade crafts can also be found. The former is geared more specifically toward the tourism industry, featuring a variety of eateries and more mainstream shops. Across from the Thundering Surf Water Park, Bay Village began in 1965 when John Maschal purchased a half-block around his shop "Country Kettle Fudge" — which had opened four years earlier — and developed it into the existing shopping area. When Bay Village opened, it adjoined the Lucy Evelyn, a three-masted schooner that had been set on land and turned into a gift shop and museum. The Lucy Evelyn, 140' long with a 32' beam and 10' draft, built in 1917 in Harrington, Maine, burned to the ground in January 1972. It was replaced by a building that resembles a schooner. One of the original "Seaman's Shacks" that surrounded the Lucy Evelyn still remains on the north-western outskirts of Bay Village. The annual Chowderfest clam chowder competition is held at Schooner's Wharf/Bay Village in Beach Haven every October, drawing a significant influx of tourists during the off-season. For the past 20 years, island restaurants have competed in Manhattan and New England clam chowder categories.

== Climate ==
According to the Köppen climate classification system, Long Beach Island, New Jersey has a humid subtropical climate (Cfa) with hot, moderately humid summers, cool winters and year-around precipitation. Cfa climates are characterized by all months having an average mean temperature > 32.0 °F (> 0.0 °C), at least four months with an average mean temperature ≥ 50.0 °F (≥ 10.0 °C), at least one month with an average mean temperature ≥ 71.6 °F (≥ 22.0 °C) and no significant precipitation difference between seasons. During the summer months in Long Beach Island, a cooling afternoon sea breeze is present on most days, but episodes of extreme heat and humidity can occur with heat index values ≥ 95 °F (≥ 35 °C). During the winter months, episodes of extreme cold and wind can occur with wind chill values < 0 °F (< -18 °C). The plant hardiness zone at 9th St Beach, Ship Bottom is 7a with an average annual extreme minimum air temperature of 3.8 °F (-15.7 °C). The average seasonal (Nov-Apr) snowfall total is between 12 and 18 inches (300 and 460 mm), and the average snowiest month is February which corresponds with the annual peak in nor'easter activity.

Climate data for ninth St Beach, Ship Bottom, NJ (1981-2010 Averages)
Month	Jan	Feb	Mar	Apr	May	Jun	Jul	Aug	Sep	Oct	Nov	Dec	Year
Mean daily maximum °F (°C)	40.2 (4.6)	42.4 (5.8)	49.1 (9.5)	57.8 (14.3)	68.1 (20.1)	77.2 (25.1)	82.6 (28.1)	81.5 (27.5)	75.6 (24.2)	65.1 (18.4)	55.0 (12.8)	45.1 (7.3)	61.7 (16.5)
Daily mean °F (°C)	33.1 (0.6)	35.2 (1.8)	41.5 (5.3)	50.3 (10.2)	60.2 (15.7)	69.6 (20.9)	75.3 (24.1)	74.3 (23.5)	67.9 (19.9)	56.9 (13.8)	47.4 (8.6)	37.9 (3.3)	54.2 (12.3)
Mean daily minimum °F (°C)	26.0 (−3.3)	27.9 (−2.3)	33.9 (1.1)	42.9 (6.1)	52.4 (11.3)	62.1 (16.7)	68.0 (20.0)	67.1 (19.5)	60.3 (15.7)	48.7 (9.3)	39.9 (4.4)	30.7 (−0.7)	46.7 (8.2)
Average precipitation inches (mm)	3.34 (85)	3.01 (76)	4.10 (104)	3.60 (91)	3.09 (78)	2.99 (76)	3.94 (100)	4.23 (107)	3.08 (78)	3.53 (90)	3.14 (80)	3.55 (90)	41.60 (1,057)
Average relative humidity (%)	66.9	64.7	63.2	64.3	67.5	71.6	70.9	72.5	71.4	70.0	68.9	67.8	68.3
Average dew point °F (°C)	23.3 (−4.8)	24.5 (−4.2)	29.9 (−1.2)	38.7 (3.7)	49.4 (9.7)	60.0 (15.6)	65.2 (18.4)	64.9 (18.3)	58.3 (14.6)	47.2 (8.4)	37.7 (3.2)	28.2 (−2.1)	44.0 (6.7)
Source: PRISM

Climate data for Atlantic City, NJ Ocean Water Temperature (24 SW Long Beach Island)
Month	Jan	Feb	Mar	Apr	May	Jun	Jul	Aug	Sep	Oct	Nov	Dec	Year
Daily mean °F (°C)	37 (3)	35 (2)	42 (6)	48 (9)	56 (13)	63 (17)	70 (21)	73 (23)	70 (21)	61 (16)	53 (12)	44 (7)	54 (12)
Source: NOAA

=== Ecology ===
According to the A. W. Kuchler U.S. potential natural vegetation types, Long Beach Island, New Jersey would have a dominant vegetation type of Northern Cordgrass (73) with a dominant vegetation form of Coastal Prairie (20).

=== Media ===
The SandPaper, an award-winning weekly newsmagazine published 50 weeks a year, has for several decades been the leading source of news coverage for communities on the island, as well as on the mainland, in addition to providing much in the way of cultural, historical and entertainment features and commentary. The Press of Atlantic City provides daily news coverage of the towns, as does WPGG radio. The governments of the towns provide columns and commentary to The Southern Ocean Times, which is one of seven weekly papers from Micromedia Publications. There is also a website called LBI Eats, which is written by locals and shares island news, restaurant and bar reviews and details about the destination's best features.

== See also ==
- Effects of Hurricane Sandy in New Jersey
- Jersey Shore
