= Manahawkin Bay =

- Map showing Manahawkin Bay
- Interactive map of Manahawkin Bay
- Coordinates: 39°41′8.84″N 74°10′22.77″W

Manahawkin Bay is a bay in the U.S. state of New Jersey in Ocean County, located between Long Beach Island and Manahawkin, on the mainland. It is a part of the New Jersey Intracoastal Waterway, a segment of the Intracoastal Waterway.

== Sources ==
- Manahawkin Bay USGS Ship Bottom Quad, New Jersey, Topographic Map. Tropozone. Online. July 2, 2008.
