= Tornado outbreak of July 28–29, 2021 =

Tornado outbreak in the Northern United States

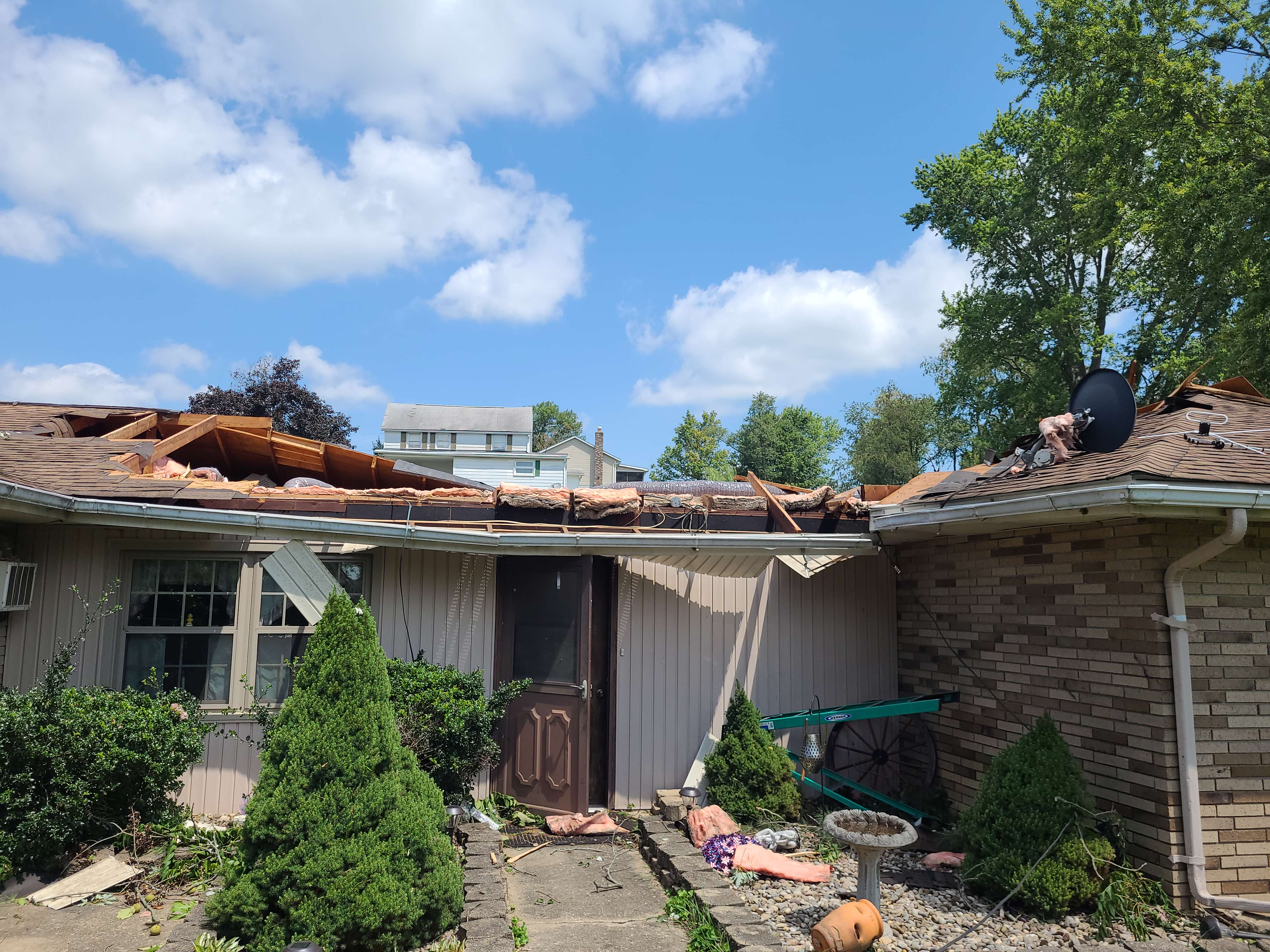
- EF2 damage to a home in New Athens, Ohio

Meteorological history
- Formed: July 28, 2021
- Dissipated: July 29, 2021

Tornado outbreak
- Tornadoes: 46
- Max. rating: EF3 tornado
- Duration: 23 hours, 33 minutes
- Highest winds: Tornadic: 140 mph (230 km/h) in Bensalem, Pennsylvania, U.S.

Overall effects
- Fatalities: 0 (1 non-tornadic)
- Injuries: 13
- Damage: $315 million (2021 USD)
- Areas affected: Great Lakes, Ohio Valley, and Mid-Atlantic, U.S.
- Part of the tornado outbreaks of 2021

An unusually prolific summer tornado outbreak affected parts of the Northern United States from the late evening and overnight hours of July 28 into the early morning hours of July 29. It started with a powerful line of severe thunderstorms that produced widespread damaging straight-line winds and multiple embedded weak tornadoes across the state of Wisconsin. During the afternoon and evening of July 29, numerous tornadic supercells developed across portions of the Ohio Valley and Mid-Atlantic regions, producing many tornadoes. A few of the tornadoes were strong and damaging, including an EF3 tornado that caused severe damage in the Philadelphia suburbs of Trevose and Bensalem.

A motorist was killed after driving into a tree felled by straight line-winds near Ripon, Wisconsin, though no tornado-related fatalities occurred. The tornado outbreak was the largest for the combined region of southeast Pennsylvania and New Jersey on record.

== Meteorological synopsis ==
On the morning of July 28, the SPC issued a moderate risk for much of Wisconsin, with an enhanced risk area extending from eastern Minnesota to southern Michigan, and southward into the extreme northern portions of Illinois and Indiana. As a frontal-wave low and associated warm front moved across the Great Lakes region, an extremely unstable and increasingly moist environment was in place across part of Minnesota and most of Wisconsin. By the late afternoon and early evening hours, significant moisture advection and daytime heating had occurred, with steep lapse rates present and CAPE values reaching up to 4500 J/kg across the threat area. With the aforementioned parameters in place, the potential existed for a significant, widespread damaging straight-line wind event to occur, potentially reaching derecho criteria. However, with helicity values at up to 600 J/kg, and effective shear reaching 70 kts, a secondary threat for tornadic supercells and embedded circulations within the line was also present, and a 10% risk area for tornadoes was outlined.

Late that evening, several supercell thunderstorms initiated and intensified rapidly in the threat area. The supercells quickly merged into a linear MCS, which pushed southward across Wisconsin overnight and into the early morning hours of July 29. While the line of storms did not reach derecho criteria, extensive damage from straight-line winds and weak tornados embedded within the squall line occurred across a large portion of Wisconsin. Two EF1 tornadoes caused damage to many trees and the roofs of homes in the Madison, Wisconsin suburbs of West Middleton and Verona. The storms produced additional wind damage in the extreme northern portions of Illinois and Indiana, before weakening to sub-severe levels and pushing though the Ohio Valley region by sunrise.

As remnants of the initial MCS complex decayed over Ohio, decreasing clouds, along with increasing temperatures and moisture began to overspread the Ohio Valley and farther east into the Mid-Atlantic region. The SPC issued slight risk with a 2% tornado risk area for the Ohio Valley, and an enhanced risk with a 5% tornado risk in the Mid-Atlantic states. Moderate shear and instability were in place across both regions, with 1000-2000 J/kg of CAPE and 40-45 kts of shear. A few tornadoes were expected to occur, though the main threat was thought to be hail and damaging winds. However, areas of enhanced helicity from remnant outflow boundaries were present as well, and the low-level wind profile became favorable for rotating supercells and tornadoes as the day progressed. By the afternoon, numerous tornadic supercells had developed, and many tornadoes touched down, a few of which were significant. This included an EF2 tornado that caused substantial damage in New Athens, Ohio.

An EF3 tornado, the strongest of the outbreak, severely impacted suburban areas of the Philadelphia metro area, injuring 5 people and destroying structures. This tornado promoted the NWS office in Mount Holly, New Jersey to issue their first ever PDS tornado warning. Farther west, storm intensity and coverage was less intense, though a few weak tornadoes also touched down in Indiana and Illinois.

By the evening, the storms moved towards the coast and out into the Atlantic Ocean, including a supercell that spawned an EF2 tornado which struck High Bar Harbor, New Jersey, resulting in structural damage and minor injuries. Severe storms and tornado activity had ceased and moved out of the area after sunset. Damage totaled US$315 million.

== Confirmed tornadoes ==
Confirmed tornadoes by Enhanced Fujita rating
| EFU | EF0 | EF1 | EF2 | EF3 | EF4 | EF5 | Total |
|---|---|---|---|---|---|---|---|
| 0 | 19 | 22 | 4 | 1 | 0 | 0 | 46 |

=== July 28 event ===
List of confirmed tornadoes – Wednesday, July 28, 2021 (Note: All dates are based on the local time zone where the tornado touched down; however, all times are in Coordinated Universal Time for consistency.)
| EF# | Location | County / Parish | State | Start Coord. | Time (UTC) | Path length | Max width |
|---|---|---|---|---|---|---|---|
| EF1 | SE of Pine River | Lincoln, Marathon | WI | 45.14°N 89.6°W | 01:40–01:44 | 2.7 mi (4.3 km) | 300 yd (270 m) |
| EF1 | Widespread tree damage occurred along the path of this tornado. | | | | | | |
| EF0 | WNW of Bevent | Marathon | WI | 44.7756°N 89.4464°W | 02:18-02:19 | 0.22 mi (0.35 km) | 100 yd (91 m) |
| EF0 | Trees were uprooted and a power pole was damaged. | | | | | | |
| EF1 | SE of New Richmond | St. Croix | WI | 45.0818°N 92.4822°W | 02:48–02:56 | 5.66 mi (9.11 km) | 100 yd (91 m) |
| EF1 | A few houses sustained roof and exterior damage, one of which had its attached garage completely destroyed with debris strewn through a nearby farm field. Outbuildings were damaged or destroyed, and trees were snapped or uprooted. | | | | | | |
| EF0 | W of Borth | Waushara | WI | 44.0993°N 88.9387°W | 04:06-04:08 | 0.47 mi (0.76 km) | 33 yd (30 m) |
| EF0 | Crops were flattened and an outbuilding was damaged. | | | | | | |

=== July 29 event ===
List of confirmed tornadoes – Thursday, July 29, 2021
| EF# | Location | County / Parish | State | Start Coord. | Time (UTC) | Path length | Max width |
|---|---|---|---|---|---|---|---|
| EF1 | S of Portage | Columbia | WI | 43.4968°N 89.489°W | 05:10–05:13 | 2.25 mi (3.62 km) | 100 yd (91 m) |
| EF1 | Trees, outbuildings, and mobile homes were damaged. Storage trailers were thrown and destroyed. | | | | | | |
| EF0 | NW of Columbus | Columbia | WI | 43.3557°N 89.05°W | 05:41–05:42 | 0.43 mi (0.69 km) | 50 yd (46 m) |
| EF0 | Minor tree and crop damage occurred. | | | | | | |
| EF0 | Cross Plains | Dane | WI | 43.1616°N 89.6873°W | 05:41–05:45 | 4.78 mi (7.69 km) | 50 yd (46 m) |
| EF0 | A small, weak tornado moved through Cross Plains, snapping numerous tree branches. | | | | | | |
| EF1 | SE of Cross Plains | Dane | WI | 43.1136°N 89.6289°W | 05:41–05:48 | 2.76 mi (4.44 km) | 250 yd (230 m) |
| EF1 | Trees were snapped or uprooted, and tree limbs were downed. Crop damage occurred, and a metal roof panel was ripped from a barn and thrown into a field. | | | | | | |
| EF1 | West Middleton | Dane | WI | 43.0759°N 89.5869°W | 05:47–05:50 | 2.44 mi (3.93 km) | 125 yd (114 m) |
| EF1 | Many trees and tree limbs were downed in West Middleton, a few of which landed on homes. A garage door was also damaged by flying tree debris. Homes sustained minor shingle damage, and a house that was under construction sustained collapse of its roof and exterior walls. | | | | | | |
| EF0 | Northern Verona | Dane | WI | 43.0448°N 89.5538°W | 05:48–05:58 | 3.52 mi (5.66 km) | 75 yd (69 m) |
| EF0 | A tornado moved through the northern part of Verona, downing trees and tree branches. One large but rotten tree trunk was snapped, a basketball hoop was blown over, and houses had fascia and gutters ripped off. Shingles were torn from the roof of an apartment building as well. | | | | | | |
| EF0 | SW of Watertown | Jefferson | WI | 43.1751°N 88.8024°W | 06:05–06:13 | 5.95 mi (9.58 km) | 100 yd (91 m) |
| EF0 | Trees were damaged, outbuildings were destroyed, and a house had a large section of roofing torn off. Another home sustained siding damage as well. | | | | | | |
| EF1 | SE of Watertown to NNE of Sullivan | Jefferson | WI | 43.1208°N 88.6687°W | 06:07–06:22 | 7.69 mi (12.38 km) | 200 yd (180 m) |
| EF1 | This tornado caused considerable damage to trees, outbuildings, and houses in and around the small community of Concord. Flag poles were bent over at a park in town, sheet metal was wrapped around power lines, and power poles were snapped. One tree fell through the roof of a home. | | | | | | |
| EF0 | NW of Farmington | Jefferson | WI | 43.1155°N 88.7444°W | 06:07–06:12 | 3.6 mi (5.8 km) | 25 yd (23 m) |
| EF0 | Trees and tree limbs were downed, and a small airplane hangar had its door torn off by this brief, weak tornado. | | | | | | |
| EF1 | W of Dousman | Jefferson, Waukesha | WI | 43.0154°N 88.5471°W | 06:23–06:28 | 4.67 mi (7.52 km) | 150 yd (140 m) |
| EF1 | Trees and tree branches were downed. One large tree fell on a house and other brought down power lines. | | | | | | |
| EF1 | N of Dousman | Waukesha | WI | 43.0358°N 88.4904°W | 06:26–06:28 | 1.03 mi (1.66 km) | 75 yd (69 m) |
| EF1 | The tornado struck a small lake where it sunk boats and flipped docks. Part of a dock was thrown 150 ft (46 m) into the second floor of a home, and additional trees and tree limbs were downed before the tornado dissipated. | | | | | | |
| EF0 | E of Wales | Waukesha | WI | 43.0306°N 88.3464°W | 06:32–06:38 | 2.44 mi (3.93 km) | 50 yd (46 m) |
| EF0 | Tree branches were snapped by this weak tornado. | | | | | | |
| EF1 | Southwestern Waukesha | Waukesha | WI | 42.985°N 88.3078°W | 06:38–06:42 | 0.88 mi (1.42 km) | 95 yd (87 m) |
| EF1 | A brief tornado caused damage in a subdivision the southwest edge of Waukesha. Many trees were snapped or uprooted, and tree limbs were downed. | | | | | | |
| EF0 | NE of Cochranton | Crawford | PA | 41.5838°N 79.9634°W | 16:40–16:41 | 0.57 mi (0.92 km) | 75 yd (69 m) |
| EF0 | A brief tornado unroofed two barns, destroyed a garage and blew it into a field, toppled a chimney, and blew a semi-truck off a road. Numerous trees were downed and corn was flattened. | | | | | | |
| EF0 | Dempseytown | Venango | PA | 41.499°N 79.795°W | 16:55–16:56 | 0.27 mi (0.43 km) | 15 yd (14 m) |
| EF0 | A dozen pine trees were snapped, and one hardwood tree was uprooted by this small and brief tornado. | | | | | | |
| EF1 | Saltlick Township | Fayette, Westmoreland | PA | 40.1061°N 79.454°W | 17:54–18:03 | 4.93 mi (7.93 km) | 100 yd (91 m) |
| EF1 | Barns, garages, and outbuildings were damaged or destroyed by this tornado. Damage to roofs and trees occurred as well. | | | | | | |
| EF1 | Laurel Hill State Park | Somerset | PA | 40.0099°N 79.2367°W | 18:25–18:28 | 0.21 mi (0.34 km) | 65 yd (59 m) |
| EF1 | Numerous trees were snapped or uprooted. Some trees fell onto conservation buildings, causing damage. | | | | | | |
| EF1 | SE of Stony Run to Weisenberg Township | Berks, Lehigh | PA | 40.611°N 75.807°W | 20:04–20:09 | 2.9 mi (4.7 km) | 90 yd (82 m) |
| EF1 | This tornado damaged and uprooted numerous trees, and caused roofing and crop damage along its path. | | | | | | |
| EF1 | Slatington | Lehigh | PA | 40.758°N 75.624°W | 20:25–20:29 | 1.15 mi (1.85 km) | 75 yd (69 m) |
| EF1 | Several trees were snapped or uprooted as the tornado touched down at Northern Lehigh High School. The roof of a wooden dugout at the school's baseball field was torn off, and some metal bleachers were tossed. The tornado continued east to the Slatington Airport, where an airplane hangar door was blown out and a small plane was tossed. Tree damage was also observed at the airport before the tornado dissipated. | | | | | | |
| EF2 | New Athens | Harrison | OH | 40.19°N 81.01°W | 20:50–21:00 | 2.73 mi (4.39 km) | 220 yd (200 m) |
| EF2 | This tornado caused considerable damage in and around New Athens, where a shed was completely swept away and destroyed with only the concrete foundation remaining. A few homes and other structures in town were damaged, including a house that lost much of its roof, with pieces of the roof being found as far as 1.4 mi (2.3 km) away in a field. Several power poles were snapped, wooden fence posts anchored in concrete were pulled out of the ground, and large trees were snapped or uprooted along the path. | | | | | | |
| EF2 | ENE of Carrollton to SW of Salineville | Carroll | OH | 40.627°N 80.995°W | 20:59–21:11 | 6.16 mi (9.91 km) | 150 yd (140 m) |
| EF2 | A strong tornado cut a path of severe tree damage through a large wooded area, and one hillside was completely deforested, with many large trees snapped or uprooted. A farm home sustained broken windows and a toppled chimney. Crops were damaged, and a metal shed was destroyed as well. | | | | | | |
| EF0 | Columbia | Howard | MD | 39.1811°N 76.8219°W | 21:07–21:08 | 0.29 mi (0.47 km) | 50 yd (46 m) |
| EF0 | A brief tornado struck the Snowden Square shopping mall along Snowden River Parkway, where a BJ's store had a section of its wall facade removed, and shopping carts were lofted and thrown. Small trees and large branches were snapped as well. | | | | | | |
| EF1 | Western Bergholz | Jefferson | OH | 40.542°N 80.908°W | 21:15–21:21 | 2.17 mi (3.49 km) | 300 yd (270 m) |
| EF1 | This tornado downed numerous trees outside of town, and one house was damaged by falling trees and a power line. Numerous trees were snapped or uprooted in a small valley along the western fringes of Bergholz before the tornado dissipated. | | | | | | |
| EF0 | S of Macksburg | Washington | OH | 39.6187°N 81.4614°W | 21:16–21:17 | 0.07 mi (0.11 km) | 55 yd (50 m) |
| EF0 | A tree was uprooted and some tree limbs were downed by this brief tornado. | | | | | | |
| EF0 | E of Indiana | Indiana | PA | 40.617°N 79.096°W | 21:20–21:21 | 0.05 mi (0.080 km) | 10 yd (9.1 m) |
| EF0 | A very small and brief tornado ripped sheet metal roofing from a barn and tossed the pieces downwind. Minor crop damage occurred, and a wooden 2x4 was thrown and punctured through the exterior wall of a metal shed. | | | | | | |
| EF0 | NE of New Holland | Pickaway | OH | 39.5778°N 83.2372°W | 21:20–21:22 | 0.86 mi (1.38 km) | 50 yd (46 m) |
| EF0 | A large outbuilding was destroyed and a single story home sustained roof damage. Two barns were also destroyed. | | | | | | |
| EF0 | NW of Myerstown | Lebanon | PA | 40.4295°N 76.3523°W | 21:34–21:38 | 0.74 mi (1.19 km) | 60 yd (55 m) |
| EF0 | Trees were downed, a children's playset was blown over, a portable toilet was thrown 40 ft (12 m), a vehicle was moved a few feet, and crop damage occurred. | | | | | | |
| EF1 | N of Gardenville to SW of Mechanicsville | Bucks | PA | 40.393°N 75.106°W | 21:40–21:45 | 2.69 mi (4.33 km) | 70 yd (64 m) |
| EF1 | A barn was heavily damaged with some walls collapsed. Trees and crops were damaged along the path, and several greenhouses were damaged as well. | | | | | | |
| EF1 | Wintersville | Jefferson | OH | 40.372°N 80.743°W | 21:45–21:52 | 2.31 mi (3.72 km) | 300 yd (270 m) |
| EF1 | In Wintersville, one single-family home sustained destruction of its attached garage and had partial loss of its roof, while other homes sustained minor to moderate roof damage. Extensive tree and fence damage was also observed, and a wooden 2x4 was found lodged into the exterior wall of a church. Metal roofing and signs were damaged as well. One business, one church, and 23 homes were damaged in the Wintersville area. | | | | | | |
| EF0 | Verona | Essex | NJ | 40.8211°N 74.2459°W | 21:54–21:57 | 0.35 mi (0.56 km) | 50 yd (46 m) |
| EF0 | Several trees and large limbs were knocked down, with one home left severely damaged by a fallen tree. | | | | | | |
| EF2 | S of New Hope, PA to SE of Titusville, NJ | Bucks (PA), Hunterdon (NJ) Mercer (NJ) | PA, NJ | 40.345°N 74.948°W | 21:59–22:14 | 6.31 mi (10.15 km) | 400 yd (370 m) |
| EF2 | Trees were damaged as the tornado first touched down just outside of New Hope, PA along the west bank of the Delaware River. After crossing the river into New Jersey, the tornado briefly entered and exited Hunterdon County. As it entered Mercer County, countless large trees downed as the tornado moved through wooded areas. Significant tree damage continued farther along the path as the tornado crossed Baldpate Mountain, with numerous large hardwood trees snapped or uprooted. Many additional trees were downed as the tornado moved through Washington Crossing State Park and Titusville, lifting just before it reached heavily populated areas near Trenton Mercer Airport. | | | | | | |
| EF1 | West Finley Township | Greene | PA | 39.962°N 80.516°W | 22:00–22:05 | 2.82 mi (4.54 km) | 200 yd (180 m) |
| EF1 | Large trees were uprooted, small trees were snapped, and large branches were broken. | | | | | | |
| EF0 | Nanty-Glo | Cambria | PA | 40.4803°N 78.8383°W | 22:10–22:11 | 0.06 mi (0.097 km) | 15 yd (14 m) |
| EF0 | A weak tornado briefly touched down at Blacklick Valley High School, where bleachers were displaced near the football field, a portable toilet was knocked over, and a few trees were snapped. | | | | | | |
| EF0 | ENE of Greenup | Cumberland | IL | 39.2687°N 88.1056°W | 22:40–22:43 | 0.52 mi (0.84 km) | 50 yd (46 m) |
| EF0 | Trees, crops, and a small outbuilding were damaged. | | | | | | |
| EF1 | Windsor | Mercer | NJ | 40.237°N 74.585°W | 22:56–23:05 | 1.64 mi (2.64 km) | 100 yd (91 m) |
| EF1 | A Montessori School in town had a portion of its roofing material torn off. Numerous trees were snapped or uprooted as well. | | | | | | |
| EF3 | Somerton to Bensalem | Philadelphia, Bucks | PA | 40.130°N 75.005°W | 23:04–23:12 | 3.4 mi (5.5 km) | 530 yd (480 m) |
| EF3 | A rain-wrapped low-end EF3 tornado caused major damage in the northeastern suburbs of Philadelphia, with the most intense damage occurring in Trevose and Bensalem. Several car dealership buildings sustained severe structural damage, with loss of roofs and exterior walls, and one building that largely collapsed. Many vehicles were flipped, thrown, or damaged by flying debris, and a large HVAC unit was thrown 200 yd (180 m). A storage trailer near one of the dealerships was lofted and dropped into an adjacent mobile home park, where multiple mobile homes were damaged, and one was completely destroyed. Seven warehouse buildings were damaged at an industrial park, one significantly, and a small utility building lost its roof. Several site-built homes, a church, a hotel, Walmart, Home Depot, and Lowe's sustained minor damage as well. A large billboard, many trees, fences, signs, light and flag poles, and power lines were also downed along the path. Five people were injured. This was the first EF3 tornado in Bucks County since reliable records began in 1950, and the first EF3 tornado in Pennsylvania since July 14, 2004. | | | | | | |
| EF0 | Bustleton | Philadelphia | PA | 40.082°N 75.033°W | 23:07–23:08 | 0.44 mi (0.71 km) | 40 yd (37 m) |
| EF0 | A brief, weak tornado touched down in the Bustleton neighborhood of Northeast Philadelphia. An apartment complex and other buildings sustained minor roof and siding damage. One building had ceiling panels pulled downward, and insulation was removed from a car park area. Some trees were snapped as well. It is believed this was an anticyclonic tornado based on radar data. | | | | | | |
| EF1 | SE of Shelbyville to W of Waldron | Shelby | IN | 39.484°N 85.7357°W | 23:58–00:04 | 2.50 mi (4.02 km) | 50 yd (46 m) |
| EF1 | Numerous trees were damaged, support beams on a porch were damaged, a masonry wall was knocked down, and an antenna pole was snapped. | | | | | | |
| EF1 | S of Waldron | Shelby | IN | 39.4265°N 85.6784°W | 00:14–00:15 | 0.71 mi (1.14 km) | 50 yd (46 m) |
| EF1 | The tornado caused a narrow path of considerable tree damage. It also impacted a cemetery, knocking over numerous gravestones in different directions. | | | | | | |
| EF1 | S of Palestine | Crawford | IL | 38.9471°N 87.6053°W | 00:20–00:22 | 0.39 mi (0.63 km) | 75 yd (69 m) |
| EF1 | Power poles were left leaning with power lines down. Debris from a nearby building was found in the power lines. | | | | | | |
| EF1 | Woodland Township to Wells Mills County Park | Burlington, Ocean | NJ | 39.775°N 74.397°W | 00:42–00:51 | 6.52 mi (10.49 km) | 250 yd (230 m) |
| EF1 | Many trees were snapped or uprooted near the Cedar Bridge Tavern Historic Site and Wells Mills County Park. | | | | | | |
| EF2 | Barnegat to Barnegat Light | Ocean | NJ | 39.754°N 74.191°W | 01:03–01:13 | 4.2 mi (6.8 km) | 75 yd (69 m) |
| EF2 | One building was damaged on the immediate western shore of Barnegat Bay as the tornado first developed. It moved over the bay as a waterspout. The waterspout became a tornado once again as it made landfall in High Bar Harbor, west of Barnegat Light. Multiple houses sustained partial to total roof loss, a car was moved, and some boats were flipped, moved, or damaged. Homes also had broken windows, siding stripped off, and damage to porches and sunrooms. A wooden 2x4 was speared through the exterior wall of one house, and a boat trailer was thrown 50 ft (15 m). Many trees and power poles were also snapped along the path. The tornado dissipated over a cove just west of Barnegat Light. 8 minor injuries were reported. | | | | | | |

== Non-tornadic impacts ==
In the state of Wisconsin, powerful straight line winds of up to 80 mph (130 km/h), led to over 35,000 power outages across the state. One person was killed after his car crashed into a fallen tree in Ripon, Wisconsin. Straight line wind gusts reached as high as 64 mph (103 km/h) in West Chicago, Illinois, with rainfall in the state reaching up to 0.77 in (20 mm) in Geneva, Illinois. Flat Rock, Indiana saw 6.66 in (169 mm) of rain from the storm. Rainfall in New Jersey varied heavily, with up to 2.32 in (59 mm) recorded. Further north, parts of I-91 in southern Vermont closed due to flooding on the night of July 29. 4.5 in (110 mm) of rain fell in Putney, Vermont.

== See also ==
- List of North American tornadoes and tornado outbreaks
- List of United States tornadoes in July 2021
- Hurricane Ida tornado outbreak – Another tornado outbreak that produced major damage in the region just over a month later
