= William Lodge (American football) =

American football coach

Biographical details
- Born: May 2, 1890; Philadelphia, Pennsylvania, U.S.
- Died: June 4, 1950 (aged 60); Long Beach, New Jersey. U.S.

Coaching career (HC unless noted)
- 1919: Southern Illinois

Head coaching record
- Overall: 2–2

William Penn Lodge (May 2, 1890 – June 4, 1950) was an American football coach. He was the third head football coach at Southern Illinois Normal College—now known as Southern Illinois University Carbondale—serving for one season, in 1919, and compiling a record of 2–2. Lodge was born in Philadelphia on May 2, 1890. He was a graduate of Battle Creek College—now known as Andrews University—in Berrien Springs, Michigan. Lodge served as a captain in the United States Marine Corps during World War I, receiving the Bronze Star Medal. He was later a medical health officer at Battle Creek Sanitarium and ran a sanitarium in Norristown, Pennsylvania. Lodge also worked as a coroner in Ocean County, New Jersey and as the town clerk for Long Beach Township, New Jersey. He died in Long Beach on June 4, 1950.

== Head coaching record ==
=== College ===
Year	Team	Overall	Conference	Standing	Bowl/playoffs
Southern Illinois Maroons (Illinois Intercollegiate Athletic Conference) (1919)
1919	Southern Illinois	2–2			
Southern Illinois:		2–2			
Total:		2–2			
