= High Bar Harbor, New Jersey =

Populated place in Ocean County, New Jersey, US

- Unincorporated community
- Location of High Bar Harbor in Ocean County Inset: Location of county within the state of New Jersey High Bar Harbor, New Jersey (New Jersey) High Bar Harbor, New Jersey (the United States)
- Coordinates: 39.7536°N 74.1198°W
- Country: United States
- State: New Jersey
- County: Ocean
- Township: Long Beach
- Time zone: UTC−05:00 (Eastern (EST))
  - Summer (DST): UTC−04:00 (Eastern (EDT))

High Bar Harbor is a neighborhood and unincorporated community located in the north-westernmost portion of Long Beach Township, in Ocean County, in the U.S. state of New Jersey. The area is on Long Beach Island, west of Barnegat Light.

The area has no beaches of its own, however, residents have a less than 10 minute walk to the beaches of Barnegat Light and must display Barnegat Light beach badges for access in season.

The 400 homes on the lagoons were developed in the mid-1950s. As the section is surrounded on three sides by water, almost all of the homes are on the water or have water access. The neighborhood has a network of canals leading from Barnegat Bay and is thus popular with boaters. While some residents are year-round inhabitants, the majority of homes are only occupied during the summer season. The neighborhood contains mostly residences and is known as a quiet, secluded, and exclusive area. Residents/home owners include sports coaches, lawyers, IT/Cloud executives and at least one Supreme Court Justice.
