= Harvey Cedars, New Jersey =

Borough in Ocean County, New Jersey, US

- Borough
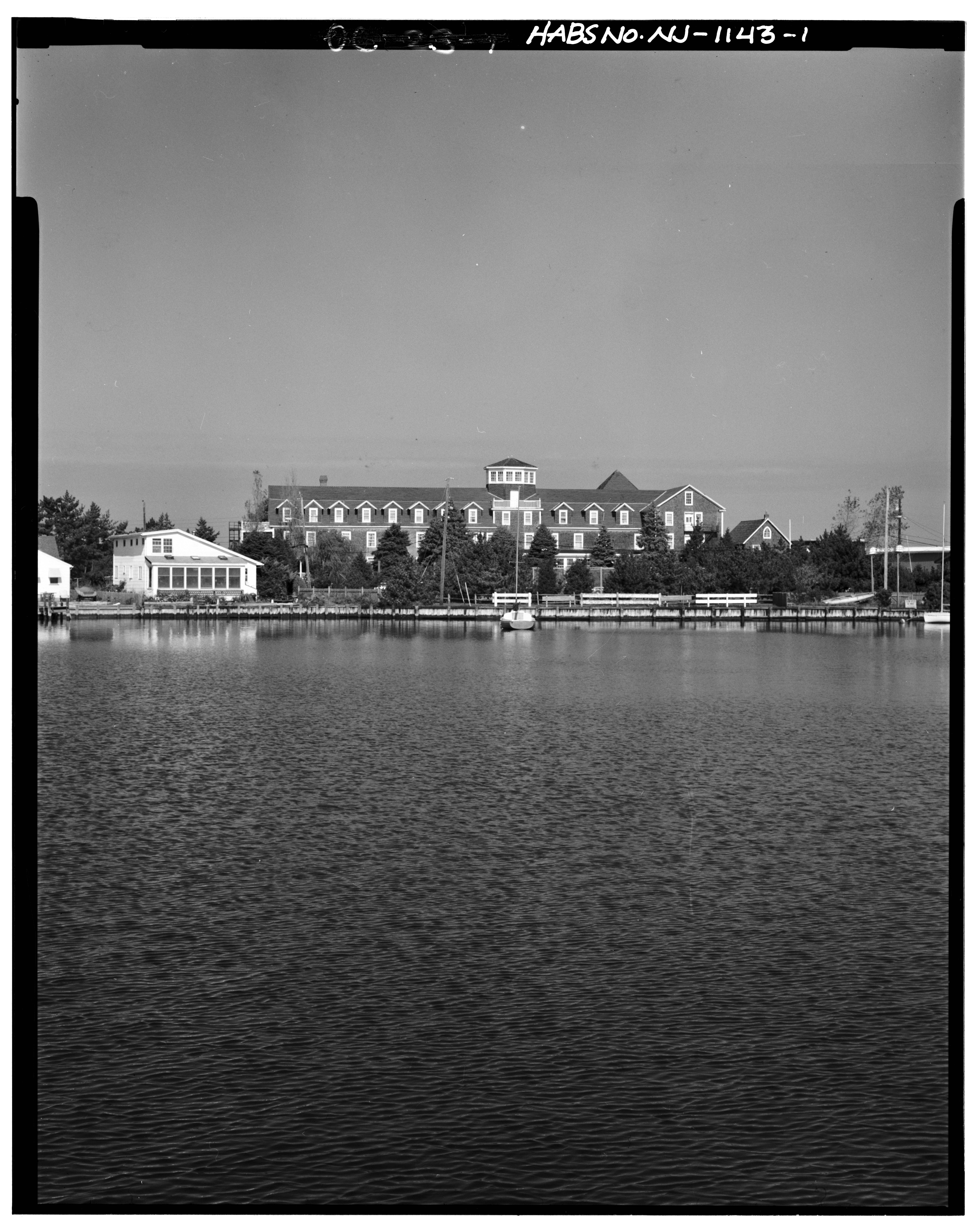
- The Harvey Cedars Hotel, on Long Beach Island

- Seal

- Location of Harvey Cedars in Ocean County highlighted in red (right). Inset map: Location of Ocean County in New Jersey highlighted in orange (left).

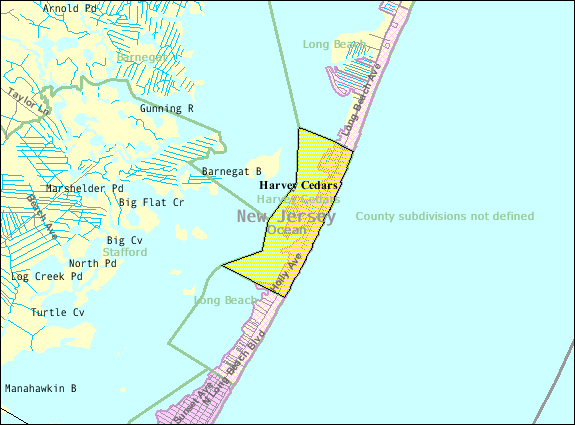
- Census Bureau map of Harvey Cedars, New Jersey

- Location in Ocean County Location in New Jersey Location in the United States
- Coordinates: 39.699578°N 74.141511°W
- Country: United States
- State: New Jersey
- County: Ocean
- Incorporated: November 20, 1894

Government
  - Type: Walsh Act
  - Body: Board of Commissioners
  - Mayor: Jonathan M. Imperiale (term ends December 31, 2027)
  - Municipal clerk: Christine Lisiewski (acting)

Area
  - Total: 1.19 sq mi (3.08 km^{2})
  - Land: 0.56 sq mi (1.45 km^{2})
  - Water: 0.63 sq mi (1.62 km^{2}) 52.61%
  - Rank: 488th of 565 in state 23rd of 33 in county
- Elevation: 3 ft (0.91 m)

Population (2020)
  - Total: 391
  - Estimate (2023): 397
  - Rank: 558th of 565 in state 32nd of 33 in county
  - Density: 696.7/sq mi (269.0/km^{2})
  - Rank: 420th of 565 in state 24th of 33 in county
- Time zone: UTC−05:00 (Eastern (EST))
  - Summer (DST): UTC−04:00 (Eastern (EDT))
- ZIP Code: 08008
- Area code: 609 exchanges: 207, 361, 492, 494
- FIPS code: 3402930390
- GNIS feature ID: 0885246
- Website: www.harveycedars.org

Harvey Cedars is a coastal borough situated on the Jersey Shore, in southern Ocean County, in the U.S. state of New Jersey. The borough encompasses a narrow strip of Long Beach Island fronting both the Atlantic Ocean and Barnegat Bay. As of the 2020 United States census, the borough's population was 391, its highest decennial count ever and an increase of 54 (+16.0%) from the 2010 census count of 337, which in turn reflected a decline of 22 (−6.1%) from the 359 counted in the 2000 census.

Harvey Cedars was incorporated as a borough by an act of the New Jersey Legislature on December 15, 1894, from portions of Union Township (now Barnegat Township), based on the results of a referendum held on November 20, 1894. The community's post office was initially known as High Point, the name of a neighborhood in the borough that lies at a higher elevation, before a name change was made in the 1930s at the request of the United States Postal Service to differentiate the post office from the northern New Jersey community of High Point in Sussex County.

The majority of the housing units in the borough are seasonal houses used primarily in the summer by owners who live elsewhere, bringing the summer population to 12,000. The borough's quiet character and bay and ocean access make housing very expensive, with many bay or oceanfront houses priced at $2 million or more. Despite the borough's small size, its property was assessed at over $1.28 billion in 2019.

== History ==
Before Long Beach Island was developed, its northern area, from the Barnegat Inlet to the Great Swamp (now Surf City), was covered with Atlantic white cedar (chamaecyparis thyoides). Early inhabitants of the area harvested salt hay (spartina patens) and seaweed to make a living.

The earliest reference to the area was a deed from 1751 that called the place "Harvest Quarters". The name "Harvey Cedars" may be derived from the "harvest" housing used by these farmers and the "cedars" that grew in the area.

== Geography ==
According to the United States Census Bureau, the borough had a total area of 1.19 square miles (3.08 km^{2}), including 0.56 square miles (1.45 km^{2}) of land and 0.63 square miles (1.62 km^{2}) of water (52.61%).

Unincorporated communities, localities and place names located partially or completely within the borough include High Point.

The borough borders the Ocean County municipalities of Barnegat Township, Long Beach Township and Stafford Township.

== Demographics ==
Historical population
Census	Pop.	Note	%±
1900	39		—
1910	33		−15.4%
1920	65		97.0%
1930	53		−18.5%
1940	74		39.6%
1950	106		43.2%
1960	134		26.4%
1970	314		134.3%
1980	363		15.6%
1990	362		−0.3%
2000	359		−0.8%
2010	337		−6.1%
2020	391		16.0%
2023 (est.)	397	▲	1.5%
Population sources: 1900–2000 1900–1920; 1900–1910 1910–1930; 1940–2000 2000; 2010 2020

=== 2010 census ===
The 2010 United States census counted 337 people, 169 households, and 110 families in the borough. The population density was 604.6 inhabitants per square mile (233.4/km^{2}). There were 1,214 housing units at an average density of 2,178.0 per square mile (840.9/km^{2}). The racial makeup was 99.11% (334) White, 0.59% (2) Black or African American, 0.00% (0) Native American, 0.30% (1) Asian, 0.00% (0) Pacific Islander, 0.00% (0) from other races, and 0.00% (0) from two or more races. Hispanic or Latino of any race were 0.89% (3) of the population.

Of the 169 households, 13.6% had children under the age of 18; 59.8% were married couples living together; 5.3% had a female householder with no husband present and 34.9% were non-families. Of all households, 32.0% were made up of individuals and 18.3% had someone living alone who was 65 years of age or older. The average household size was 1.99 and the average family size was 2.47.

11.6% of the population were under the age of 18, 4.5% from 18 to 24, 10.1% from 25 to 44, 32.0% from 45 to 64, and 41.8% who were 65 years of age or older. The median age was 61.6 years. For every 100 females, the population had 97.1 males. For every 100 females ages 18 and older there were 97.4 males.

The Census Bureau's 2006–2010 American Community Survey showed that (in 2010 inflation-adjusted dollars) median household income was $106,875 (with a margin of error of +/− $15,693) and the median family income was $112,656 (+/− $8,889). Males had a median income of $85,625 (+/− $32,732) versus $51,875 (+/− $42,840) for females. The per capita income for the borough was $74,525 (+/− $13,683). About 3.0% of families and 4.2% of the population were below the poverty line, including none of those under age 18 and 6.2% of those age 65 or over.

=== 2000 census ===
As of the 2000 United States census there were 359 people, 167 households, and 112 families residing in the borough. The population density was 657.1 inhabitants per square mile (253.7/km^{2}). There were 1,205 housing units at an average density of 2,205.6 per square mile (851.6/km^{2}). The racial makeup of the borough was 96.94% White, 0.56% African American, 0.28% Native American, 0.28% Asian, 1.95% from other races. Hispanic or Latino of any race were 3.62% of the population.

There were 167 households, out of which 16.8% had children under the age of 18 living with them, 61.7% were married couples living together, 4.2% had a female householder with no husband present, and 32.9% were non-families. 29.3% of all households were made up of individuals, and 15.6% had someone living alone who was 65 years of age or older. The average household size was 2.15 and the average family size was 2.61.

In the borough the population was spread out, with 14.5% under the age of 18, 4.2% from 18 to 24, 22.0% from 25 to 44, 29.0% from 45 to 64, and 30.4% who were 65 years of age or older. The median age was 54 years. For every 100 females, there were 102.8 males. For every 100 females age 18 and over, there were 106.0 males.

The median income for a household in the borough was $61,875, and the median income for a family was $69,722. Males had a median income of $71,042 versus $32,361 for females. The per capita income for the borough was $36,757. About 2.6% of families and 5.1% of the population were below the poverty line, including 5.1% of those under age 18 and 2.9% of those age 65 or over.

== Government ==
=== Local government ===
The Borough of Harvey Cedars has operated under the Walsh Act form of New Jersey municipal government since 1923. The borough is one of 30 municipalities (of the 564) statewide that use the commission form of government. The governing body is comprised of the three-member Board of Commissioners whose members are elected at-large on a non-partisan basis to serve concurrent four-year terms of office in voting held as part of the November general election. Each commissioner is assigned to oversee and administer a department. The Mayor and Deputy Mayor are elected by the Board from among its members. The mayor has no veto power.

As of 2024, members of the Harvey Cedars Board of Commissioners are Mayor Johnathan M. Imperiale (Commissioner of Public Affairs and Public Safety), Joseph F. Gieger (Commissioner of Public Works, Parks and Public Property) and Paul George Rice (Commissioner of Revenue and Finance), all of whom are serving concurrent four-year terms of office that expire on December 31, 2027.

=== Federal, state and county representation ===
Harvey Cedars is located in the 2nd Congressional District and is part of New Jersey's 9th state legislative district. Prior to the 2010 Census, Harvey Cedars had been part of the 3rd Congressional District, a change made by the New Jersey Redistricting Commission that took effect in January 2013, based on the results of the November 2012 general elections.

For the 119th United States Congress, New Jersey's 2nd congressional district is represented by Jeff Van Drew (R, Dennis Township). New Jersey is represented in the United States Senate by Democrats Cory Booker (Newark, term ends 2027) and Andy Kim (Moorestown, term ends 2031).

For the 2026–2027 session, the 9th legislative district of the New Jersey Legislature is represented in the State Senate by Carmen Amato (R, Berkeley Township) and in the General Assembly by Greg Myhre (R, Stafford Township) and Brian E. Rumpf (R, Little Egg Harbor Township).

Ocean County is governed by a Board of County Commissioners composed of five members who are elected on an at-large basis in partisan elections and serving staggered three-year terms of office, with either one or two seats coming up for election each year as part of the November general election. At an annual reorganization held in the beginning of January, the board chooses a director and a deputy director from among its members. As of 2025, Ocean County's Commissioners (with party affiliation, term-end year and residence) are:

John P. Kelly (R, 2025, Eagleswood Township), Virginia E. Haines (R, 2025, Toms River), Robert Arace (R, Manchester Township, 2027) Jennifer Bacchione (R, Berkeley Township, 2027) and Frank Sadeghi (R, 2026, Toms River).

Constitutional officers elected on a countywide basis are: Clerk Scott M. Colabella (R, 2025, Barnegat Light), Sheriff Michael G. Mastronardy (R, 2025; Toms River) and Surrogate Jeffrey Moran (R, 2028, Beachwood).

=== Politics ===
As of March 2011, there were a total of 375 registered voters in Harvey Cedars, of which 86 (22.9%) were registered as Democrats, 157 (41.9%) were registered as Republicans and 132 (35.2%) were registered as Unaffiliated. There were no voters registered to other parties. Among the borough's 2010 Census population, 111.3% (vs. 63.2% in Ocean County) were registered to vote, including 125.8% of those ages 18 and over (vs. 82.6% countywide).

Gubernatorial election results for Harvey Cedars
Year	Republican		Democratic		Third party(ies)	
Year	No.	%	No.	%	No.	%
2025	155	48.14%	167	51.86%	0	0.00%
2021	127	49.03%	130	50.19%	2	0.77%
2017	101	49.51%	99	48.53%	4	1.96%
2013	159	73.61%	54	25.00%	3	1.39%
2009	126	57.80%	78	35.78%	14	6.42%
2005	127	63.82%	61	30.65%	11	5.53%

In the 2012 presidential election, Republican Mitt Romney received 58.7% of the vote (152 cast), ahead of Democrat Barack Obama with 40.5% (105 votes), and other candidates with 0.8% (2 votes), among the 262 ballots cast by the borough's 412 registered voters (3 ballots were spoiled), for a turnout of 63.6%. In the 2008 presidential election, Republican John McCain received 54.5% of the vote (145 cast), ahead of Democrat Barack Obama with 42.5% (113 votes) and other candidates with 1.1% (3 votes), among the 266 ballots cast by the borough's 384 registered voters, for a turnout of 69.3%. In the 2004 presidential election, Republican George W. Bush received 60.1% of the vote (181 ballots cast), outpolling Democrat John Kerry with 39.5% (119 votes) and other candidates with 0.3% (1 votes), among the 301 ballots cast by the borough's 388 registered voters, for a turnout percentage of 77.6.

Presidential Elections Results
Year	Republican	Democratic	Third Parties
2024	43.4% 172	53.8% 213	2.8% 7
2020	40.9% 151	56.9% 210	2.2% 4
2016	44.9% 129	49.1% 141	5.9% 17
2012	58.7% 152	40.5% 105	0.8% 2
2008	54.5% 145	42.5% 113	1.1% 3
2004	60.1% 181	39.5% 119	0.3% 1

In the 2013 gubernatorial election, Republican Chris Christie received 73.6% of the vote (159 cast), ahead of Democrat Barbara Buono with 25.0% (54 votes), and other candidates with 1.4% (3 votes), among the 221 ballots cast by the borough's 423 registered voters (5 ballots were spoiled), for a turnout of 52.2%. In the 2009 gubernatorial election, Republican Chris Christie received 56.8% of the vote (126 ballots cast), ahead of Democrat Jon Corzine with 35.1% (78 votes), Independent Chris Daggett with 5.9% (13 votes) and other candidates with 0.5% (1 votes), among the 222 ballots cast by the borough's 355 registered voters, yielding a 62.5% turnout.

United States Senate election results for Harvey Cedars1
Year	Republican		Democratic		Third party(ies)	
Year	No.	%	No.	%	No.	%
2024	184	47.92%	199	51.82%	1	0.26%
2018	129	50.39%	119	46.48%	8	3.13%
2012	152	60.32%	97	38.49%	3	1.19%
2006	123	57.48%	90	42.06%	1	0.47%

United States Senate election results for Harvey Cedars2
Year	Republican		Democratic		Third party(ies)	
Year	No.	%	No.	%	No.	%
2020	163	45.03%	195	53.87%	4	1.10%
2014	114	54.81%	93	44.71%	1	0.48%
2013	88	55.00%	72	45.00%	0	0.00%
2008	145	57.54%	103	40.87%	4	1.59%

== Education ==
For pre-kindergarten through sixth grade, public school students attend the Long Beach Island Consolidated School District, which also serves students from Barnegat Light, Long Beach Township, Ship Bottom and Surf City. As of the 2020–21 school year, the district, comprised of two schools, had an enrollment of 215 students and 30.7 classroom teachers (on an FTE basis), for a student–teacher ratio of 7.0:1. Schools in the district (with 2020–21 enrollment data from the National Center for Education Statistics) are Ethel Jacobsen School in Surf City with 111 students in pre-kindergarten to second grade and Long Beach Island Grade School in Ship Bottom with 125 students in grades 3–6. The district's board of education is comprised of nine members who are directly elected from the constituent municipalities on a staggered basis, with three members elected each year. Of the nine seats, one is elected from Harvey Cedars.

Students in public school for seventh through twelfth grades attend the Southern Regional School District, which serves the five municipalities in the Long Beach Island Consolidated School District, along with students from Beach Haven and Stafford Township, as well as students from Ocean Township (including its Waretown section) who attend as part of a sending/receiving relationship. Schools in the district (with 2020–21 enrollment data from the National Center for Education Statistics) are Southern Regional Middle School with 902 students in grades 7–8 and Southern Regional High School with 1,975 students in grades 9–12. Both schools are in the Manahawkin section of Stafford Township.

At the time of its founding in 1957, the Southern Regional School District had a roughly equal number of students from Long Beach Island and Stafford Township. By 2016, the overwhelming majority of students were from Stafford Township, accounting for nearly 90% of enrollment. These demographic changes have led to significant discrepancies in the cost per pupil sent to the district from each community, with Harvey Cedars and Long Beach Township paying more than $200,000 per pupil, while Stafford Township's costs are $3,600 for each student. These widely different costs result from a formula that uses the taxable property value in each municipality to apportion costs, which means that municipalities with relatively high property values and small numbers of students pay a higher share of total district costs. Some residents of Long Beach Island communities are seeking to amend the formula to take advantage of a 1993 law that allows districts to use both property value and enrollment to allocate property taxes, though that would require passage of referendums in each municipality.

== Transportation ==
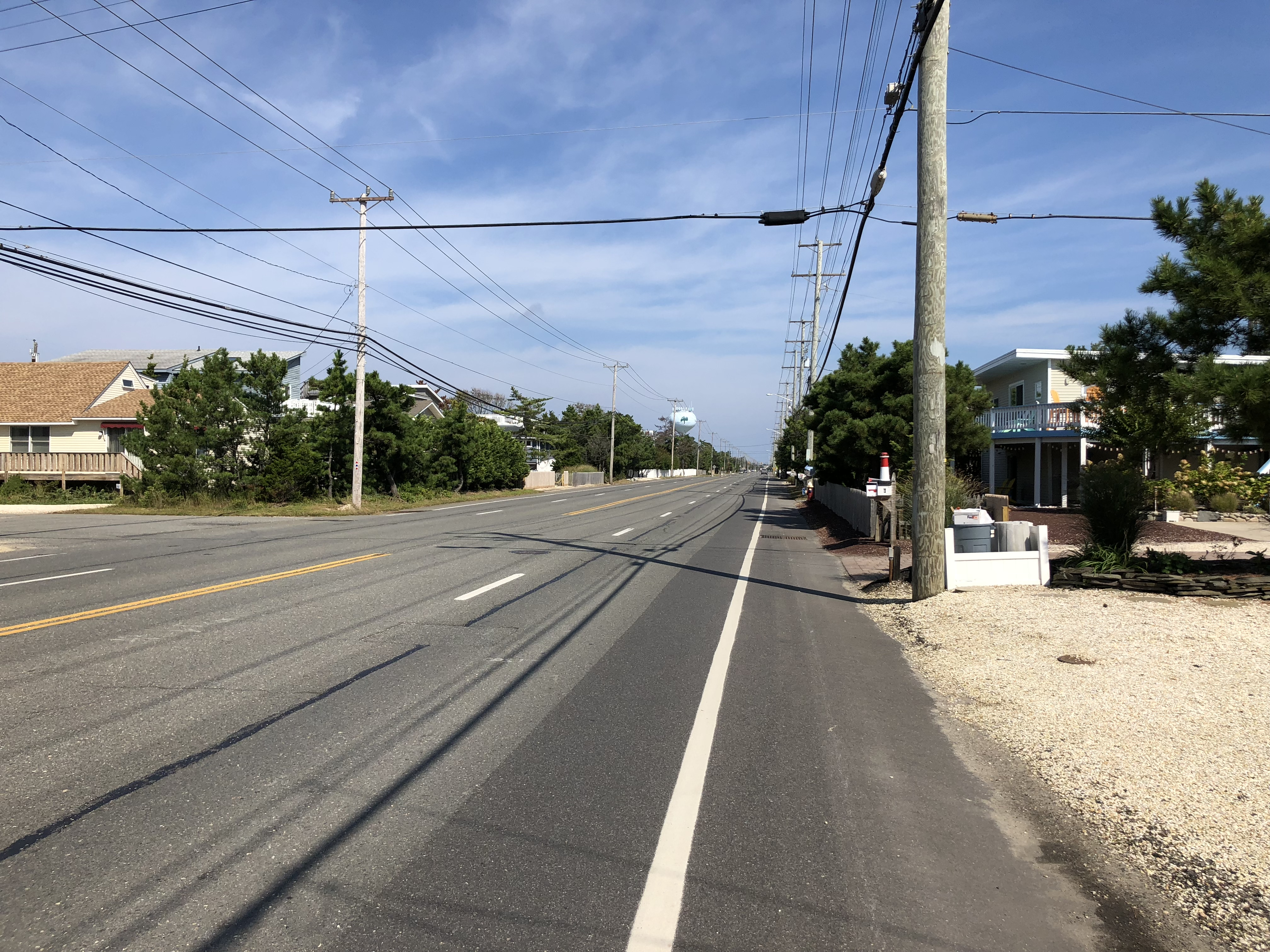
County Route 607 (Long Beach Boulevard) northbound in Harvey Cedars

=== Roads and highways ===
As of May 2010, the borough had a total of 9.82 miles (15.80 km) of roadways, of which 7.59 miles (12.21 km) were maintained by the municipality and 2.23 miles (3.59 km) by Ocean County.

No Interstate, U.S. or state highways serve Harvey Cedars. The main road serving the borough is County Route 607 (Long Beach Boulevard).

=== Public transportation ===
Ocean County Ride provides bus service on the OC9 LBI North route between Barnegat Light and Manahawkin / Stafford Township.

The LBI Shuttle operates along Long Beach Boulevard, providing free service every 5 to 20 minutes from 10:00 AM to 10:00 PM. It serves the Long Beach Island municipalities / communities of Barnegat Light, Loveladies, Harvey Cedars, North Beach, Surf City, Ship Bottom, Long Beach Township, Beach Haven and Holgate.

== Climate ==
According to the Köppen climate classification system, Harvey Cedars has a humid subtropical climate (Cfa) with hot, moderately humid summers, cool winters, and year-around precipitation. Cfa climates are characterized by all months having an average mean temperature above 32.0 °F (0.0 °C), at least four months with an average mean temperature at or above 50.0 °F (10.0 °C), at least one month with an average mean temperature at or above 71.6 °F (22.0 °C) and no significant precipitation difference between seasons. During the summer months in Harvey Cedars, a cooling afternoon sea breeze is present on most days, but episodes of extreme heat and humidity can occur with heat index values at or above 95.0 °F (35.0 °C). During the winter months, episodes of extreme cold and wind can occur with wind chill values below 0.0 °F (−17.8 °C). The plant hardiness zone at Harvey Cedars Beach is 7a with an average annual extreme minimum air temperature of 3.5 °F (−15.8 °C). The average seasonal (November–April) snowfall total is 12 to 18 inches (30 to 46 cm) and the average snowiest month is February which corresponds with the annual peak in nor'easter activity.

Climate data for Harvey Cedars Beach, NJ (1981–2010 Averages)
Month	Jan	Feb	Mar	Apr	May	Jun	Jul	Aug	Sep	Oct	Nov	Dec	Year
Mean daily maximum °F (°C)	40.2 (4.6)	42.3 (5.7)	49.1 (9.5)	57.6 (14.2)	67.9 (19.9)	77.0 (25.0)	82.6 (28.1)	81.4 (27.4)	75.6 (24.2)	65.0 (18.3)	55.0 (12.8)	45.2 (7.3)	61.7 (16.5)
Daily mean °F (°C)	33.0 (0.6)	35.1 (1.7)	41.4 (5.2)	50.1 (10.1)	60.1 (15.6)	69.4 (20.8)	75.2 (24.0)	74.2 (23.4)	67.9 (19.9)	56.8 (13.8)	47.4 (8.6)	37.9 (3.3)	54.1 (12.3)
Mean daily minimum °F (°C)	25.8 (−3.4)	27.8 (−2.3)	33.8 (1.0)	42.6 (5.9)	52.2 (11.2)	61.9 (16.6)	67.8 (19.9)	67.0 (19.4)	60.2 (15.7)	48.5 (9.2)	39.8 (4.3)	30.6 (−0.8)	46.6 (8.1)
Average precipitation inches (mm)	3.42 (87)	2.99 (76)	4.15 (105)	3.71 (94)	3.27 (83)	3.20 (81)	4.07 (103)	4.29 (109)	3.24 (82)	3.58 (91)	3.34 (85)	3.69 (94)	42.95 (1,091)
Average relative humidity (%)	66.9	65.0	63.1	64.8	67.5	72.0	70.9	72.8	71.6	69.9	68.9	67.8	68.4
Average dew point °F (°C)	23.2 (−4.9)	24.5 (−4.2)	29.8 (−1.2)	38.7 (3.7)	49.3 (9.6)	60.0 (15.6)	65.1 (18.4)	64.9 (18.3)	58.4 (14.7)	47.1 (8.4)	37.7 (3.2)	28.2 (−2.1)	44.0 (6.7)
Source: PRISM

Climate data for Atlantic City, NJ Ocean Water Temperature (28 SW Harvey Cedars)
Month	Jan	Feb	Mar	Apr	May	Jun	Jul	Aug	Sep	Oct	Nov	Dec	Year
Daily mean °F (°C)	37 (3)	35 (2)	42 (6)	48 (9)	56 (13)	63 (17)	70 (21)	73 (23)	70 (21)	61 (16)	53 (12)	44 (7)	54 (12)
Source: NOAA

== Ecology ==
According to the A. W. Kuchler U.S. potential natural vegetation types, Harvey Cedars would have a dominant vegetation type of Northern Cordgrass (73) with a dominant vegetation form of Coastal Prairie (20).

== Notable people ==
People who were born in, residents of, or otherwise closely associated with Harvey Cedars include:

- Francis Biddle (1886–1968), United States Attorney General from 1941 to 1945, owned a summer home in Harvey Cedars.
- Wendy Mae Chambers (born 1953), composer
- Paul L. Gill (1894–1938), watercolor painter and teacher
- Sue May Gill (1887–1989), artist and member of the Philadelphia Ten
- Leon Kelly (1901–1982), artist best known for his contributions to Surrealism
- Nathan Gregory Silvermaster (1898–1964), economist with the United States War Production Board during World War II, who was the head of a large Communist spy ring in the U.S. government

Preceded by Loveladies	Beaches of New Jersey	Succeeded by North Beach
