= Loveladies, New Jersey =

Populated place in Ocean County, New Jersey, US

- Unincorporated community
- Loveladies's location in Ocean County (Inset: Ocean County in New Jersey) Loveladies, New Jersey (New Jersey) Loveladies, New Jersey (the United States)
- Coordinates: 39°43′25″N 74°08′01″W
- Country: United States
- State: New Jersey
- County: Ocean
- Township: Long Beach
- Named after: Thomas Lovelady
- Elevation: 6.6 ft (2 m)
- ZIP Code: 08008
- Area codes: 609, 640
- GNIS feature ID: 0877949

Loveladies is a neighborhood and unincorporated community located in the northernmost portion of Long Beach Township, in Ocean County, in the U.S. state of New Jersey. The area is on Long Beach Island, between Barnegat Light and Harvey Cedars.

== History ==
In 1871, a location of the United States Life-Saving Service was established in the area. There was a small, 10-acre (40,000 m^{2}) island in the bay adjacent to the station which was owned by a man named Thomas Lovelady. The area was called Lovelady's, which eventually evolved to Loveladies. It has frequently been noted on lists of unusual place names.

== Beaches ==
All of Loveladies' beaches are open to the public. There are four access points off of Long Beach Boulevard for visitor access, all of which have free public parking available:

- Dolphin Lane (North Pumping Station)
- Coast Avenue
- Loveladies Lane (South Pumping Station)
- Seashell Lane

== Long Beach Island Foundation of the Arts and Sciences ==
Loveladies is home to the Long Beach Island Foundation of the Arts and Sciences, established in 1948 by artist Boris Blai. The organization provides arts, science and recreation programs to area residents and visitors. The Long Beach Island Foundation of the Arts and Sciences offers an After School Arts Education Program to area schools, an Artists Residency and Retreat Program for New Jersey Artists, Visiting Artists in Ceramics during the summer season, and ceramics scholarships and residency opportunities.

== Climate ==
According to the Köppen climate classification system, Loveladies has a humid subtropical climate (Cfa) with hot, moderately humid summers, cool winters and year-around precipitation. Cfa climates are characterized by all months having an average mean temperature above 32.0 °F (> 0.0 °C), at least four months with an average mean temperature at or above 50.0 °F (≥ 10.0 °C), at least one month with an average mean temperature at or above 71.6 °F (≥ 22.0 °C) and no significant precipitation difference between seasons. During the summer months in Loveladies, a cooling afternoon sea breeze is present on most days, but episodes of extreme heat and humidity can occur with heat index values at or above 95.0 °F (35.0 °C). During the winter months, episodes of extreme cold and wind can occur with wind chill values below 0 °F (< -18 °C). The plant hardiness zone at Loveladies Beach is 7a with an average annual extreme minimum air temperature of 3.3 °F (−15.9 °C). The average seasonal (November–April) snowfall total is 12 to 18 inches (30 to 46 cm), and the average snowiest month is February which corresponds with the annual peak in nor'easter activity.

Climate data for Loveladies Beach, NJ (1981-2010 Averages)
Month	Jan	Feb	Mar	Apr	May	Jun	Jul	Aug	Sep	Oct	Nov	Dec	Year
Mean daily maximum °F (°C)	40.2 (4.6)	42.5 (5.8)	49.0 (9.4)	57.9 (14.4)	68.1 (20.1)	77.2 (25.1)	82.7 (28.2)	81.5 (27.5)	75.7 (24.3)	65.1 (18.4)	55.1 (12.8)	45.2 (7.3)	61.8 (16.6)
Daily mean °F (°C)	33.0 (0.6)	35.2 (1.8)	41.4 (5.2)	50.3 (10.2)	60.1 (15.6)	69.6 (20.9)	75.2 (24.0)	74.3 (23.5)	67.9 (19.9)	56.8 (13.8)	47.4 (8.6)	37.8 (3.2)	54.2 (12.3)
Mean daily minimum °F (°C)	25.8 (−3.4)	27.8 (−2.3)	33.8 (1.0)	42.6 (5.9)	52.2 (11.2)	61.9 (16.6)	67.8 (19.9)	67.0 (19.4)	60.1 (15.6)	48.4 (9.1)	39.6 (4.2)	30.4 (−0.9)	46.5 (8.1)
Average precipitation inches (mm)	3.45 (88)	2.99 (76)	4.17 (106)	3.74 (95)	3.31 (84)	3.25 (83)	4.13 (105)	4.32 (110)	3.29 (84)	3.60 (91)	3.39 (86)	3.73 (95)	43.37 (1,102)
Average relative humidity (%)	66.6	64.4	63.1	64.3	67.2	71.6	70.6	72.3	71.4	69.7	68.9	67.5	68.2
Average dew point °F (°C)	23.1 (−4.9)	24.4 (−4.2)	29.8 (−1.2)	38.7 (3.7)	49.2 (9.6)	60.0 (15.6)	65.0 (18.3)	64.8 (18.2)	58.3 (14.6)	47.0 (8.3)	37.7 (3.2)	28.0 (−2.2)	43.9 (6.6)
Source: PRISM

Climate data for Atlantic City, NJ Ocean Water Temperature (30 SW Loveladies)
Month	Jan	Feb	Mar	Apr	May	Jun	Jul	Aug	Sep	Oct	Nov	Dec	Year
Daily mean °F (°C)	37 (3)	35 (2)	42 (6)	48 (9)	56 (13)	63 (17)	70 (21)	73 (23)	70 (21)	61 (16)	53 (12)	44 (7)	54 (12)
Source: NOAA

== Ecology ==
According to the A. W. Kuchler U.S. potential natural vegetation types, Loveladies would have a dominant vegetation type of Northern Cordgrass (73) with a dominant vegetation form of Coastal Prairie (20).

Preceded by Barnegat Light	Beaches of New Jersey	Succeeded by Harvey Cedars
