= Long Beach Township, New Jersey =

Township in Ocean County, New Jersey, US

- Township
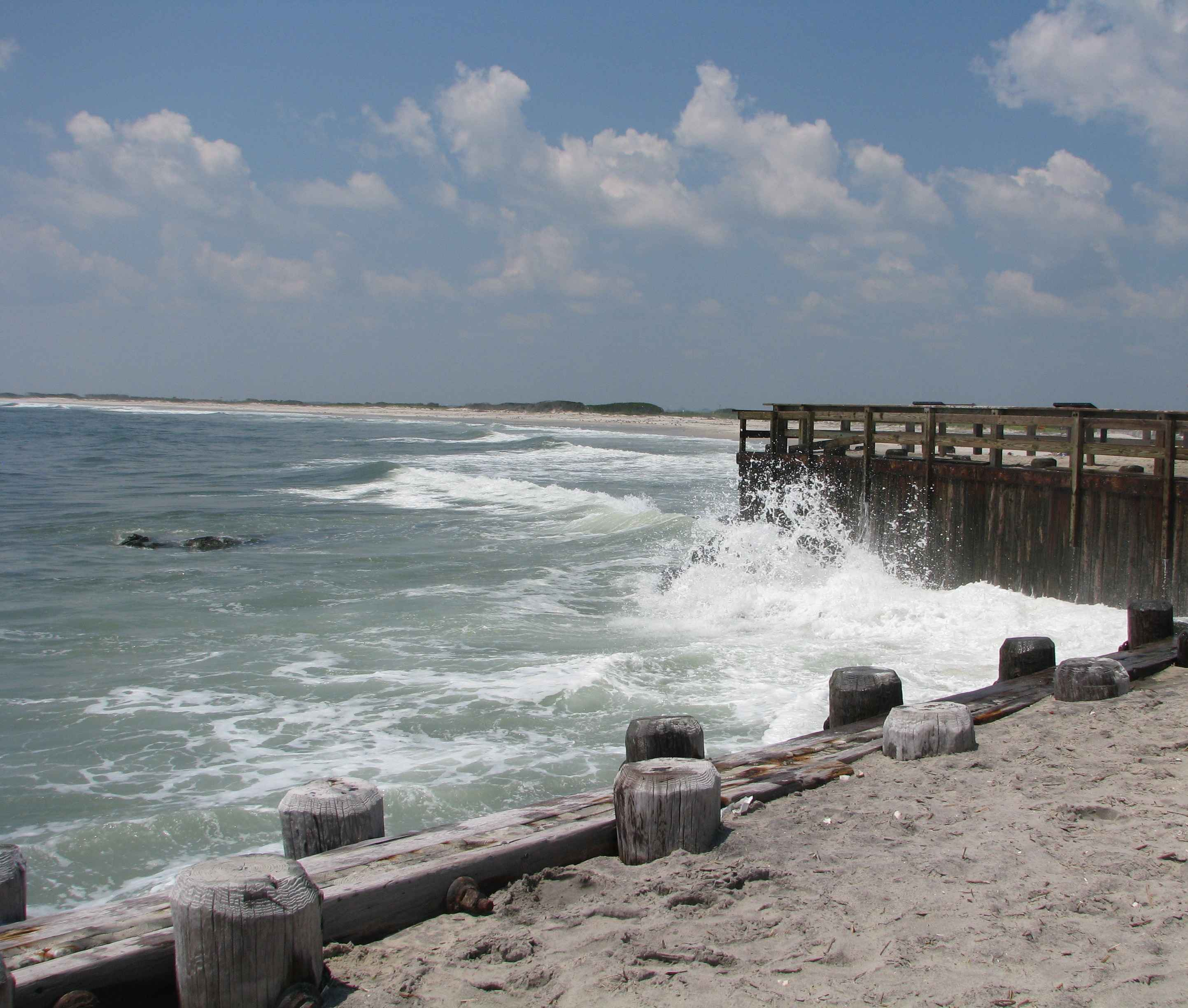
- Holgate Beach, part of the Edwin B. Forsythe National Wildlife Refuge, managed by the U.S. Fish and Wildlife Service, at the southern tip of Long Beach Island, within Long Beach Township, Ocean County

- Seal

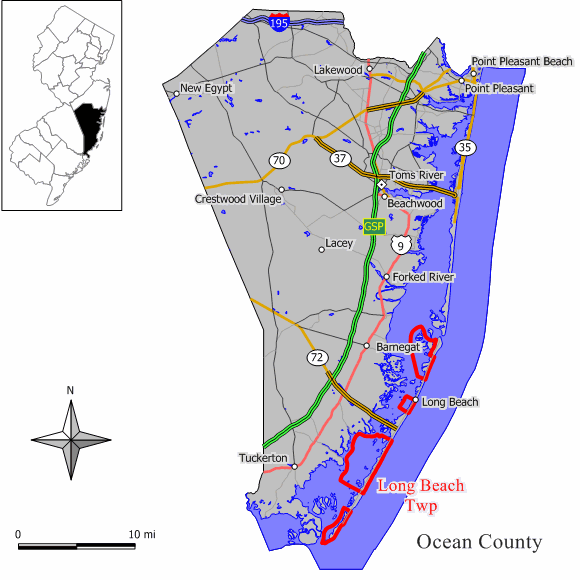
- Location of Long Beach Township in Ocean County highlighted in yellow (right). Inset map: Location of Ocean County in New Jersey highlighted in black (left).

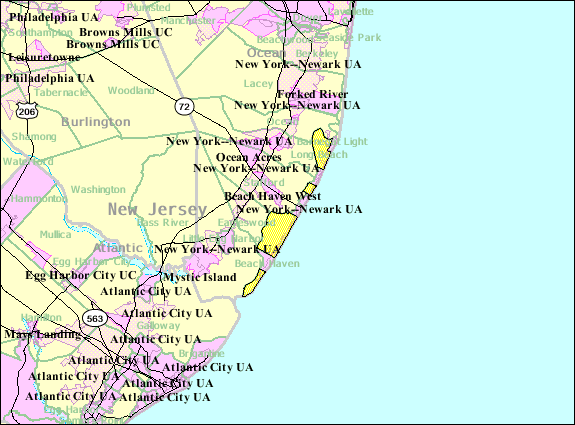
- Census Bureau map of Long Beach Township, New Jersey

- Location in Ocean County Location in New Jersey Location in the United States
- Coordinates: 39.60155°N 74.226367°W
- Country: United States
- State: New Jersey
- County: Ocean
- Incorporated: March 23, 1899

Government
  - Type: Walsh Act
  - Body: Board of Commissioners
  - Mayor: Joseph H. Mancini (term ends December 31, 2024)
  - Administrator: Kyle Ominski
  - Municipal clerk: Danielle La Valle

Area
  - Total: 21.99 sq mi (56.95 km^{2})
  - Land: 5.45 sq mi (14.11 km^{2})
  - Water: 16.54 sq mi (42.84 km^{2}) 75.22%
  - Rank: 124th of 565 in state 13th of 33 in county
- Elevation: 0 ft (0 m)

Population (2020)
  - Total: 3,153
  - Estimate (2023): 3,145
  - Rank: 442nd of 565 in state 18th of 33 in county
  - Density: 578.7/sq mi (223.4/km^{2})
  - Rank: 434th of 565 in state 27th of 33 in county
- Time zone: UTC−05:00 (Eastern (EST))
  - Summer (DST): UTC−04:00 (Eastern (EDT))
- ZIP Code: 08008
- Area code: 609 exchanges: 207, 361, 492, 494
- FIPS code: 3402941250
- GNIS feature ID: 0882066
- Website: www.longbeachtownship.com

Long Beach Township is a Walsh Act Township situated on the Jersey Shore, in southeastern Ocean County, in the U.S. state of New Jersey. As of the 2020 United States census, the township's population was 3,153, an increase of 102 (+3.3%) from the 2010 census count of 3,051, which in turn reflected a decline of 278 (−8.4%) from the 3,329 counted in the 2000 census.

Most of the township is located on Long Beach Island, a barrier island along the Atlantic Ocean whose summer population swells to as much as 130,000, including part-time residents and tourists. In October 2012, Long Beach Township was severely affected by Hurricane Sandy, with township mayor Joe Mancini estimating that potential costs to repair the damage estimated as high as $1 billion across Long Beach Island. As a result of the storm surge, flooding and high winds, dozens of homes and businesses were damaged or destroyed. After the waters receded, streets were left covered with up to four feet of sand in some spots. Governor Chris Christie issued a mandatory evacuation order on October 28, and it remained in place until a full 13 days after the storm. The township established a Sandy Relief Fund to assist residents in their recovery from the hurricane.

Long Beach Township was incorporated as a township by an act of the New Jersey Legislature on March 23, 1899, from portions of Eagleswood Township, Little Egg Harbor Township, Ocean Township, Stafford Township and Union Township (now known as Barnegat Township). Portions of the township were taken to form Barnegat City (March 29, 1904, now Barnegat Light) and Ship Bottom-Beach Arlington (March 3, 1925, now Ship Bottom). The name derives from the length of the island along Barnegat Bay.

== Geography ==
According to the United States Census Bureau, the township had a total area of 21.99 square miles (56.95 km^{2}), including 5.45 square miles (14.11 km^{2}) of land and 16.54 square miles (42.84 km^{2}) of water (75.22%).

North Beach Haven (with a 2020 Census population of 2,189) is an unincorporated community and census-designated place (CDP) located within Long Beach Township. Other unincorporated communities, localities and place names located partially or completely within the township include the Long Beach Island communities of Bay Vista, Beach Haven Crest, Beach Haven Gardens, Beach Haven Heights, Beach Haven Inlet, Beach Haven Park, Beach Haven Terrace, Brant Beach, Brighton Beach, Haven Beach, High Bar Harbor, Holgate, Loveladies, North Beach, North Beach Haven, Peahala Park, South Beach Haven, Spray Beach, and the Dunes.

The township is divided into four noncontiguous land areas. The most populous, with most of the named places, is located north of Beach Haven and south of Ship Bottom. The Holgate section is south of Beach Haven; most of it is a wildlife preserve. Loveladies and High Bar Harbor form the northernmost, between Harvey Cedars and Barnegat Light.

The township borders the Ocean County municipalities of Barnegat Light, Barnegat Township, Beach Haven, Eagleswood Township, Harvey Cedars, Little Egg Harbor Township, Ocean Township, Ship Bottom, Stafford Township and Surf City.

== Demographics ==
Historical population
Census	Pop.	Note	%±
1900	152		—
1910	107	*	−29.6%
1920	106		−0.9%
1930	355	*	234.9%
1940	425		19.7%
1950	840		97.6%
1960	1,561		85.8%
1970	2,910		86.4%
1980	3,488		19.9%
1990	3,407		−2.3%
2000	3,329		−2.3%
2010	3,051		−8.4%
2020	3,153		3.3%
2023 (est.)	3,145		−0.3%
Population sources: 1900–2000 1900–1920; 1900–1910 1910–1930; 1940–2000 2000; 2010 2020 * = Lost territory in previous decade.

=== 2010 census ===
The 2010 United States census counted 3,051 people, 1,539 households, and 943 families in the township. The population density was 560.5 inhabitants per square mile (216.4/km^{2}). There were 9,216 housing units at an average density of 1,693.0 per square mile (653.7/km^{2}). The racial makeup was 96.98% (2,959) White, 0.26% (8) Black or African American, 0.03% (1) Native American, 0.49% (15) Asian, 0.00% (0) Pacific Islander, 1.57% (48) from other races, and 0.66% (20) from two or more races. Hispanic or Latino of any race were 4.13% (126) of the population.

Of the 1,539 households, 9.6% had children under the age of 18; 53.9% were married couples living together; 4.7% had a female householder with no husband present and 38.7% were non-families. Of all households, 34.8% were made up of individuals and 19.4% had someone living alone who was 65 years of age or older. The average household size was 1.98 and the average family size was 2.48.

9.9% of the population were under the age of 18, 3.9% from 18 to 24, 12.7% from 25 to 44, 33.4% from 45 to 64, and 40.1% who were 65 years of age or older. The median age was 61.3 years. For every 100 females, the population had 96.6 males. For every 100 females ages 18 and older there were 97.3 males.

The Census Bureau's 2006–2010 American Community Survey showed that (in 2010 inflation-adjusted dollars) median household income was $77,396 (with a margin of error of +/− $15,929) and the median family income was $95,417 (+/− $12,507). Males had a median income of $69,922 (+/− $25,066) versus $59,688 (+/− $18,587) for females. The per capita income for the borough was $63,020 (+/− $9,706). About 2.3% of families and 3.5% of the population were below the poverty line, including none of those under age 18 and 7.1% of those age 65 or over.

=== 2000 census ===
As of the 2000 United States census there were 3,329 people, 1,664 households, and 1,038 families residing in the township. The population density was 627.3 inhabitants per square mile (242.2/km^{2}). There were 9,023 housing units at an average density of 1,700.1 per square mile (656.4/km^{2}). The racial makeup of the township was 98.53% White, 0.24% African American, 0.03% Native American, 0.36% Asian, 0.33% from other races, and 0.51% from two or more races. Hispanic or Latino of any race were 2.10% of the population.

There were 1,664 households, out of which 12.3% had children under the age of 18 living with them, 53.5% were married couples living together, 6.4% had a female householder with no husband present, and 37.6% were non-families. 33.8% of all households were made up of individuals, and 19.9% had someone living alone who was 65 years of age or older. The average household size was 2.00 and the average family size was 2.50.

In the township the population was spread out, with 11.7% under the age of 18, 3.9% from 18 to 24, 17.9% from 25 to 44, 30.0% from 45 to 64, and 36.5% who were 65 years of age or older. The median age was 57 years. For every 100 females, there were 90.2 males. For every 100 females age 18 and over, there were 89.2 males.

The median income for a household in the township was $48,697, and the median income for a family was $59,833. Males had a median income of $41,681 versus $31,528 for females. The per capita income for the township was $33,404. About 3.8% of families and 5.1% of the population were below the poverty line, including 7.6% of those under age 18 and 5.8% of those age 65 or over.

== Recreation ==
=== Long Beach Township Beach Patrol ===
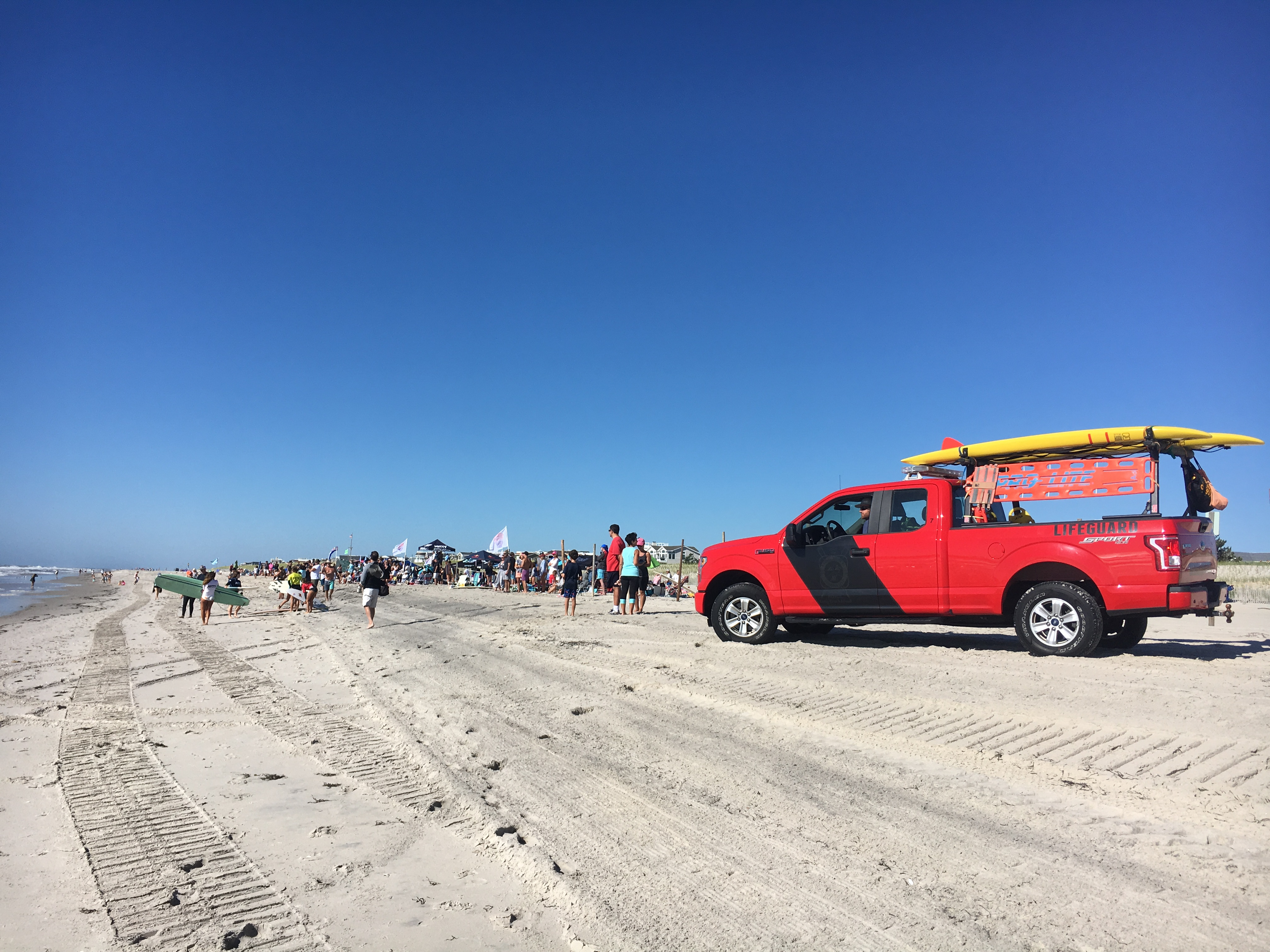
Long Beach Township truck on duty.

The Long Beach Township Beach Patrol (LBTBP) was formed in 1936 to serve and protect the public and the environment on the 12 miles (19 km) of beaches in the township. It offers different programs, like the Lifeguard in Training (LIT) Program and the Beach Badge Checking Program, and holds annual competitions and events for lifeguards.

The six communities that the patrol serves from north to south are Loveladies, North Beach, Brant Beach, Beach Haven Crest, Spray Beach, and Holgate.

=== St. Francis of Assisi Parish ===
The Saint Francis of Assisi Parish operates largely in Long Beach Township and comprised of four churches and a community center. The church supports traditional Franciscan Catholic beliefs and is led by pastor Francis DiSpigno, OFM.

The St. Francis Community Center, founded in 1972, provides many programs to the public, including athletics, senior and educational services, and volunteering opportunities.

== Government ==
=== Local government ===
Long Beach Township has been governed under the Walsh Act form of New Jersey municipal government, since 1936. The township is one of 30 municipalities (of the 564) statewide that use the commission form of government. The governing body is comprised of three commissioners, who are elected to serve concurrent four-year terms on a non-partisan basis, in elections held as part of the November general election. The Board of Commissioners passed an ordinance in February 2011 shifting the nonpartisan elections from May to November, beginning as of the November 2012 election.

As of 2024, the members of the Long Beach Township Board of Commissioners are Mayor Joseph H. Mancini (Commissioner of Public Affairs and Public Safety), Alexander L. Meehan (Commissioner of Public Works, Parks and Public Property; elected to serve an unexpired term) and Joseph P. Lattanzi (Commissioner of Revenue and Finance), all serving terms of office that end December 31, 2024.

In May 2023, Alexander Meehan was appointed to fill the seat expiring in December 2024 that became vacant following the death of Ralph Bayard. Meehan served on an interim basis until the November 2023 general election, when he was voted in to serve the remainder of the term of office.

On August 12, 2009, Commissioner DiAnne Gove was selected by Republican county committee members to fill the remainder of the term of Daniel Van Pelt in the General Assembly representing the 9th Legislative District after Van Pelt had resigned after being arrested on corruption charges.

=== Federal, state and county representation ===
Long Beach Township is located in the 2nd Congressional District and is part of New Jersey's 9th state legislative district.

For the 119th United States Congress, New Jersey's 2nd congressional district is represented by Jeff Van Drew (R, Dennis Township). New Jersey is represented in the United States Senate by Democrats Cory Booker (Newark, term ends 2027) and Andy Kim (Moorestown, term ends 2031).

For the 2026–2027 session, the 9th legislative district of the New Jersey Legislature is represented in the State Senate by Carmen Amato (R, Berkeley Township) and in the General Assembly by Greg Myhre (R, Stafford Township) and Brian E. Rumpf (R, Little Egg Harbor Township).

Ocean County is governed by a Board of County Commissioners composed of five members who are elected on an at-large basis in partisan elections and serving staggered three-year terms of office, with either one or two seats coming up for election each year as part of the November general election. At an annual reorganization held in the beginning of January, the board chooses a director and a deputy director from among its members. As of 2025, Ocean County's Commissioners (with party affiliation, term-end year and residence) are:

John P. Kelly (R, 2025, Eagleswood Township), Virginia E. Haines (R, 2025, Toms River), Robert Arace (R, Manchester Township, 2027) Jennifer Bacchione (R, Berkeley Township, 2027) and Frank Sadeghi (R, 2026, Toms River).

Constitutional officers elected on a countywide basis are: Clerk Scott M. Colabella (R, 2025, Barnegat Light), Sheriff Michael G. Mastronardy (R, 2025; Toms River) and Surrogate Jeffrey Moran (R, 2028, Beachwood).

=== Politics ===
As of March 2011, there were a total of 2,955 registered voters in Long Beach Township, of which 544 (18.4%) were registered as Democrats, 1,215 (41.1%) were registered as Republicans and 1,195 (40.4%) were registered as Unaffiliated. There was one voter registered to another party. Among the township's 2010 Census population, 96.9% (vs. 63.2% in Ocean County) were registered to vote, including 107.5% of those ages 18 and over (vs. 82.6% countywide).

Gubernatorial election results for Long Beach Township
Year	Republican		Democratic		Third party(ies)	
Year	No.	%	No.	%	No.	%
2025	1,282	59.35%	872	40.37%	6	0.28%
2021	1,034	58.39%	727	41.05%	10	0.56%
2017	938	61.51%	556	36.46%	31	2.03%
2013	1,267	81.37%	275	17.66%	15	0.96%
2009	1,167	64.33%	512	28.22%	135	7.44%
2005	1,000	62.89%	523	32.89%	67	4.21%

In the 2012 presidential election, Republican Mitt Romney received 64.3% of the vote (1,166 cast), ahead of Democrat Barack Obama with 34.8% (632 votes), and other candidates with 0.9% (16 votes), among the 1,844 ballots cast by the township's 3,027 registered voters (30 ballots were spoiled), for a turnout of 60.9%. In the 2008 presidential election, Republican John McCain received 61.3% of the vote (1,441 cast), ahead of Democrat Barack Obama with 36.8% (865 votes) and other candidates with 1.1% (26 votes), among the 2,351 ballots cast by the township's 3,132 registered voters, for a turnout of 75.1%. In the 2004 presidential election, Republican George W. Bush received 63.1% of the vote (1,499 ballots cast), outpolling Democrat John Kerry with 35.6% (847 votes) and other candidates with 0.6% (20 votes), among the 2,377 ballots cast by the township's 3,128 registered voters, for a turnout percentage of 76.0.

Presidential Elections Results
Year	Republican	Democratic	Third Parties
2024	55.0% 1,408	43.6% 1,115	1.4% 24
2020	52.6% 1,336	45.9% 1,165	1.4% 23
2016	59.9% 1,286	37.3% 801	2.8% 60
2012	64.3% 1,166	34.8% 632	0.9% 16
2008	61.3% 1,441	36.8% 865	1.1% 26
2004	63.1% 1,499	35.6% 847	0.6% 20

In the 2013 gubernatorial election, Republican Chris Christie received 81.4% of the vote (1,267 cast), ahead of Democrat Barbara Buono with 17.7% (275 votes), and other candidates with 1.0% (15 votes), among the 1,570 ballots cast by the township's 2,960 registered voters (13 ballots were spoiled), for a turnout of 53.0%. In the 2009 gubernatorial election, Republican Chris Christie received 63.7% of the vote (1,167 ballots cast), ahead of Democrat Jon Corzine with 27.9% (512 votes), Independent Chris Daggett with 6.6% (121 votes) and other candidates with 0.8% (14 votes), among the 1,833 ballots cast by the township's 3,041 registered voters, yielding a 60.3% turnout.

United States Senate election results for Long Beach Township1
Year	Republican		Democratic		Third party(ies)	
Year	No.	%	No.	%	No.	%
2024	1,391	55.71%	1,096	43.89%	10	0.40%
2018	1,179	62.18%	671	35.39%	46	2.43%
2012	1,136	64.66%	592	33.69%	29	1.65%
2006	1,075	65.59%	538	32.82%	26	1.59%

United States Senate election results for Long Beach Township2
Year	Republican		Democratic		Third party(ies)	
Year	No.	%	No.	%	No.	%
2020	1,372	55.50%	1,078	43.61%	22	0.89%
2014	883	64.26%	475	34.57%	16	1.16%
2013	716	63.70%	406	36.12%	2	0.18%
2008	1,430	65.36%	732	33.46%	26	1.19%

== Education ==
For pre-kindergarten through sixth grade, public school students attend the Long Beach Island Consolidated School District, which serves students from Barnegat Light, Harvey Cedars, Long Beach Township, Ship Bottom and Surf City. As of the 2020–21 school year, the district, comprised of two schools, had an enrollment of 215 students and 30.7 classroom teachers (on an FTE basis), for a student–teacher ratio of 7.0:1. Schools in the district (with 2020–21 enrollment data from the National Center for Education Statistics) are Ethel Jacobsen School in Surf City with 111 students in pre-kindergarten to second grade and Long Beach Island Grade School in Ship Bottom with 125 students in grades 3–6. The district's board of education is comprised of nine members who are directly elected from the constituent municipalities on a staggered basis, with three members elected each year. Of the nine seats, four are elected from Long Beach Township.

Students in public school for seventh through twelfth grades attend the Southern Regional School District, which serves the five municipalities in the Long Beach Island Consolidated School District, along with students from Beach Haven and Stafford Township, as well as students from Ocean Township (including its Waretown section) who attend as part of a sending/receiving relationship. Schools in the district (with 2020–21 enrollment data from the National Center for Education Statistics) are Southern Regional Middle School with 902 students in grades 7–8 and Southern Regional High School with 1,975 students in grades 9–12. Both schools are in the Manahawkin section of Stafford Township.

At the time of its founding in 1957, the Southern Regional School District had a roughly equal number of students from Long Beach Island and Stafford Township. By 2016, the overwhelming majority of students were from Stafford Township, accounting for nearly 90% of enrollment. These demographic changes have led to significant discrepancies in the cost per pupil sent to the district from each community, with Harvey Cedars and Long Beach Township paying more than $200,000 per pupil, while Stafford Township's costs are $3,600 for each student. These widely different costs result from a formula that uses the taxable property value in each municipality to apportion costs, which means that municipalities with relatively high property values and small numbers of students pay a higher share of total district costs. Some residents of Long Beach Island communities are seeking to amend the formula to take advantage of a 1993 law that allows districts to use both property value and enrollment to allocate property taxes, though that would require passage of referendums in each municipality.

St. Mary Academy near Manahawkin, a K–8 school of the Roman Catholic Diocese of Trenton, is in the area. From 1997, until 2019 it operated as All Saints Regional Catholic School and was collectively managed by five churches, with one being St. Francis of Assisi Church in Brant Beach. In 2019, St. Mary Church in Barnegat took entire control of the school, which remained on the same Manahawkin campus, and changed its name. The other churches no longer operate the school but still may send students there.

== Transportation ==
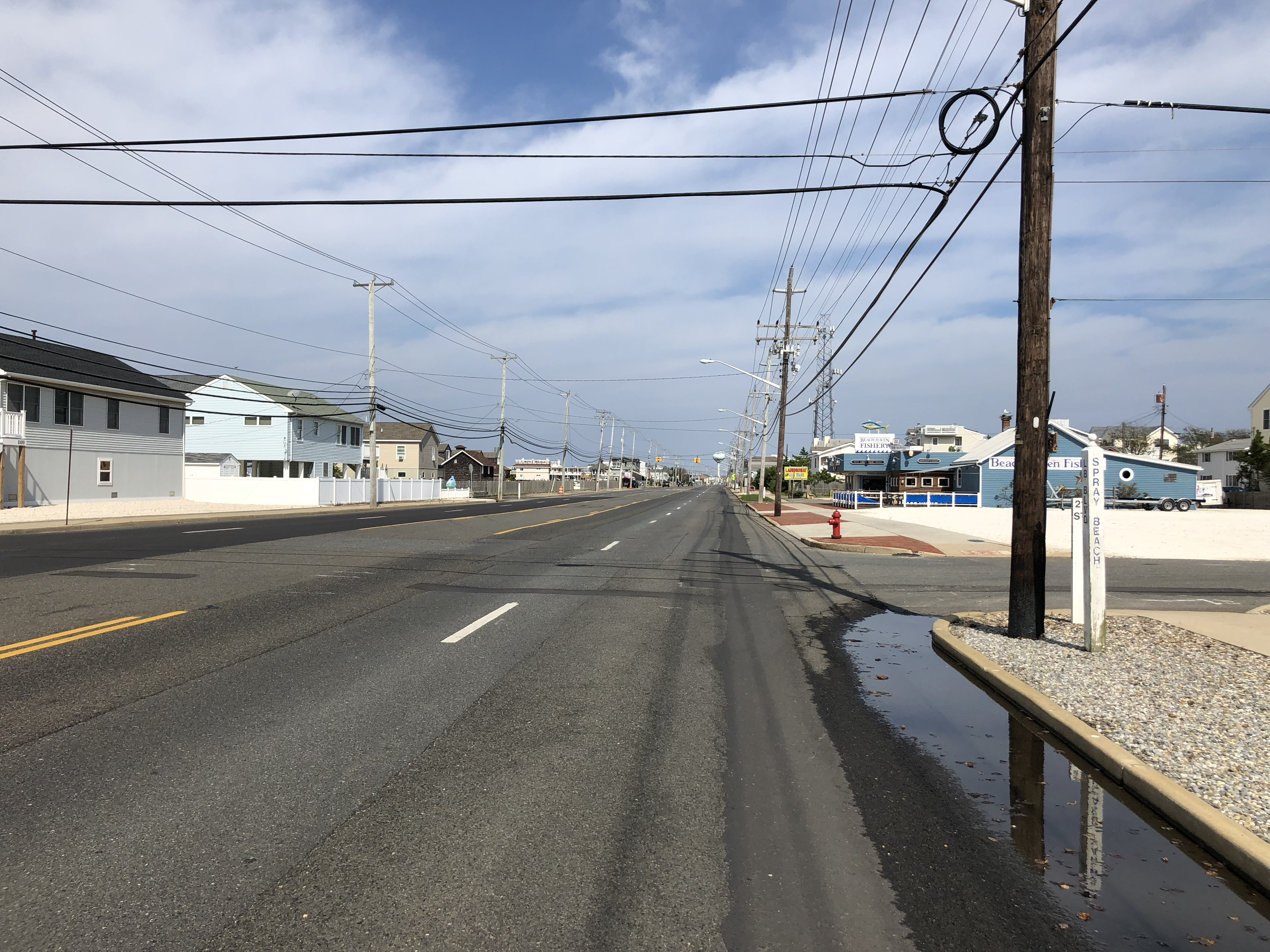
County Route 607 (Long Beach Boulevard) northbound in Long Beach Township

=== Roads and highways ===
As of May 2010, the township had a total of 66.33 miles (106.75 km) of roadways, of which 54.41 miles (87.56 km) were maintained by the municipality and 11.92 miles (19.18 km) by Ocean County.

No Interstate, U.S. or state highways serve Long Beach Township. The main road serving the township is County Route 607 (Long Beach Boulevard).

=== Public transportation ===
Ocean Ride local service is provided on the OC9 LBI North / South route.

The LBI Shuttle operates along Long Beach Boulevard, providing free service every 5 to 20 minutes from 10:00 AM to 10:00 PM. It serves the Long Beach Island municipalities/communities of Barnegat Light, Loveladies, Harvey Cedars, North Beach, Surf City, Ship Bottom, Long Beach Township, Beach Haven and Holgate.

Surf Line Bus services sections of Long Beach Township in the summer months, with buses from New York City to LBI on Friday night, returning to New York City on Sunday night. Transportazumah provides daily bus service to and from New York during the summer season.

== Climate ==
According to the Köppen climate classification system, Long Beach Township has a humid subtropical climate (Cfa) with hot, moderately humid summers, cool winters and year-around precipitation. Cfa climates are characterized by all months having an average mean temperature above 32.0 °F (0.0 °C), at least four months with an average mean temperature at or above 50.0 °F (10.0 °C), at least one month with an average mean temperature at or above 71.6 °F (22.0 °C) and no significant precipitation difference between seasons. During the summer months in Long Beach Township, a cooling afternoon sea breeze is present on most days, but episodes of extreme heat and humidity can occur with heat index values at or above 95.0 °F (35.0 °C). During the winter months, episodes of extreme cold and wind can occur with wind chill values below 0.0 °F (−17.8 °C). The plant hardiness zone at Long Beach Township Beach is 7a with an average annual extreme minimum air temperature of 4.3 °F (−15.4 °C). The average seasonal (November–April) snowfall total is 12 to 18 inches (30 to 46 cm) and the average snowiest month is February which corresponds with the annual peak in nor'easter activity.

Climate data for Long Beach Township Beach, NJ (1981–2010 Averages)
Month	Jan	Feb	Mar	Apr	May	Jun	Jul	Aug	Sep	Oct	Nov	Dec	Year
Mean daily maximum °F (°C)	40.3 (4.6)	42.4 (5.8)	49.1 (9.5)	57.8 (14.3)	68.1 (20.1)	77.3 (25.2)	82.7 (28.2)	81.4 (27.4)	75.5 (24.2)	64.9 (18.3)	55.0 (12.8)	45.2 (7.3)	61.7 (16.5)
Daily mean °F (°C)	33.2 (0.7)	35.3 (1.8)	41.6 (5.3)	50.5 (10.3)	60.4 (15.8)	69.8 (21.0)	75.4 (24.1)	74.3 (23.5)	68.0 (20.0)	56.9 (13.8)	47.6 (8.7)	38.0 (3.3)	54.3 (12.4)
Mean daily minimum °F (°C)	26.2 (−3.2)	28.1 (−2.2)	34.1 (1.2)	43.1 (6.2)	52.6 (11.4)	62.2 (16.8)	68.1 (20.1)	67.2 (19.6)	60.5 (15.8)	48.8 (9.3)	40.1 (4.5)	30.8 (−0.7)	46.9 (8.3)
Average precipitation inches (mm)	3.25 (83)	3.05 (77)	4.01 (102)	3.45 (88)	2.89 (73)	2.78 (71)	3.84 (98)	4.13 (105)	2.91 (74)	3.47 (88)	2.95 (75)	3.40 (86)	40.13 (1,019)
Average relative humidity (%)	67.2	65.0	63.7	64.6	67.5	71.6	71.1	72.8	71.6	70.2	68.6	67.8	68.5
Average dew point °F (°C)	23.5 (−4.7)	24.7 (−4.1)	30.2 (−1.0)	39.0 (3.9)	49.6 (9.8)	60.2 (15.7)	65.4 (18.6)	65.0 (18.3)	58.5 (14.7)	47.3 (8.5)	37.8 (3.2)	28.3 (−2.1)	44.2 (6.8)
Source: PRISM

Climate data for Atlantic City, NJ Ocean Water Temperature (20 SW Long Beach Township)
Month	Jan	Feb	Mar	Apr	May	Jun	Jul	Aug	Sep	Oct	Nov	Dec	Year
Daily mean °F (°C)	37 (3)	35 (2)	42 (6)	48 (9)	56 (13)	63 (17)	70 (21)	73 (23)	70 (21)	61 (16)	53 (12)	44 (7)	54 (12)
Source: NOAA

== Ecology ==
According to the A. W. Kuchler U.S. potential natural vegetation types, Long Beach Township would have a dominant vegetation type of Northern Cordgrass (73) with a dominant vegetation form of Coastal Prairie (20).

== See also ==
- Long Beach Island

Preceded by Harvey Cedars	Beaches of New Jersey	Succeeded by Surf City
