= Barnegat Light, New Jersey =

Borough in Ocean County, New Jersey, US

- Borough
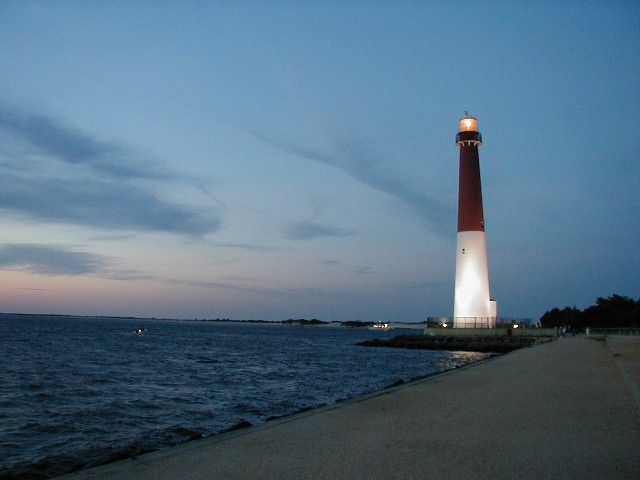
- Barnegat Lighthouse

- Seal

- Location of Barnegat Light in Ocean County highlighted in red (right). Inset map: Location of Ocean County in New Jersey highlighted in orange (left).

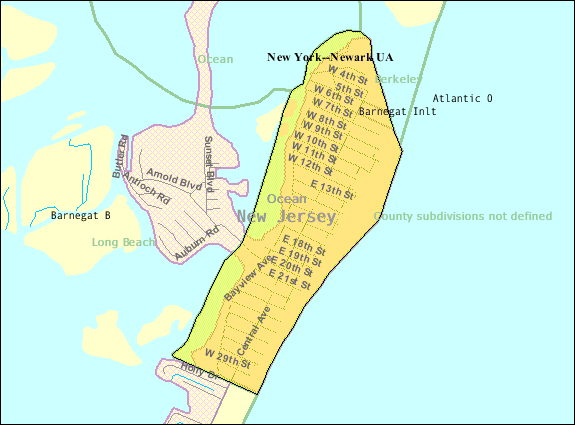
- Census Bureau map of Barnegat Light, New Jersey

- Location in Ocean County Location in New Jersey Location in the United States
- Coordinates: 39.753505°N 74.104953°W
- Country: United States
- State: New Jersey
- County: Ocean
- Incorporated: March 29, 1904 as Barnegat City
- Renamed: November 2, 1948 as Barnegat Light
- Named for: Dutch language "breaker's inlet"

Government
  - Type: Borough
  - Body: Borough Council
  - Mayor: Edwin Wellington Jr. (R, appointed to term ending December 31, 2026)
  - Municipal clerk: Brenda L. Kuhn

Area
  - Total: 1.20 sq mi (3.10 km^{2})
  - Land: 0.83 sq mi (2.15 km^{2})
  - Water: 0.37 sq mi (0.95 km^{2}) 30.50%
  - Rank: 487th of 565 in state 22nd of 33 in county
- Elevation: 3 ft (0.91 m)

Population (2020)
  - Total: 640
  - Estimate (2023): 652
  - Rank: 548th of 565 in state 31st of 33 in county
  - Density: 770.3/sq mi (297.4/km^{2})
  - Rank: 411th of 565 in state 22nd of 33 in county
- Time zone: UTC−05:00 (Eastern (EST))
  - Summer (DST): UTC−04:00 (Eastern (EDT))
- ZIP Code: 08006
- Area codes: 609 exchanges: 361, 494
- FIPS code: 3402903130
- GNIS feature ID: 0885148
- Website: www.barnegatlight.org

Barnegat Light (pronounced "BAR-nuh-git") is a borough in Ocean County, in the U.S. state of New Jersey. As of the 2020 United States census, the borough's population was 640, an increase of 66 (+11.5%) from the 2010 census count of 574, which in turn reflected a decline of 190 (−24.9%) from the 764 counted in the 2000 census. The borough borders the Atlantic Ocean on Long Beach Island and is home to Barnegat Lighthouse.

Barnegat Light was formed as a borough by the New Jersey Legislature on November 2, 1948, to replace Barnegat City borough, which in turn had been created on March 29, 1904, from portions of Long Beach Township.

== History ==
=== Early history ===
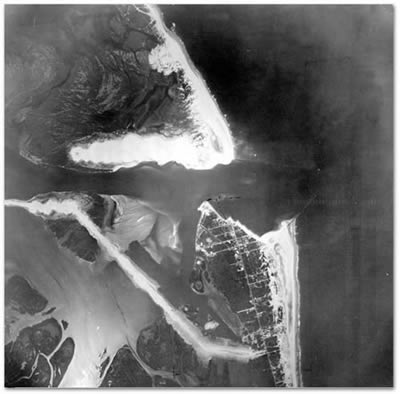
Barnegat City in 1944

The area surrounding Barnegat Bay and Barnegat Inlet was described by Henry Hudson in 1609, as "...a great lake of water, as we could judge it to be ... The mouth of the lake hath many shoals, and the sea breaketh on them as it is cast out of the mouth of it." The name of the bay, mainland town, and island town were extensions of the inlet's name, named so in the 1610s by later Dutch mariners as "barende-gat" which was a general Dutch lingual description of a powerful inlet, not a formal place name, and depending on its context meant "burning hole" or "inlet of breakers." Subsequent transliteration as control of the land changed hands throughout the 17th century Anglo-Dutch wars resulted in barende-gat and its variations becoming Barnegat and a formal name for many locations and features in the area.

On October 26, 1782, a Belgian cutter traveling southward became stranded near the inlet. The ship was noticed by revolutionaries led by Captain Andrew Steelman, who recruited local men to unload the cargo. While at rest on the beach, the crews were attacked by Captain John Bacon, who ran a pinelands gang and was affiliated with the Loyalists. Almost all of Steelman's men were murdered in what became known as the Barnegat Light Massacre, which led to a manhunt and battle at Cedar Bridge Tavern and one of the last of the Revolutionary War.

By the 19th century, Long Beach Island was known for its plentiful and various wildlife, fishing, favorable sailing conditions, and pleasant weather in summer. In 1801, most of the northern tip of what was then commonly referred to as Barnegat Beach, a neighbor to the established mainland town of Barnegat across the bay, was purchased by Bornt Slaght, a founder of Staten Island and a revolutionary veteran, who built a small house, the first structure on the north end of Long Beach Island, and later, in 1821, a hotel, one of the first seaside hotels in New Jersey. In the late 1820s, Slaght sold his hotel to Jacob Herring, thereafter known as the Herring House. The building lodged many of the visiting hunters and sport fishermen, who primarily came from New York City and Philadelphia.

The first lighthouse at Barnegat Inlet was built in 1834 in recognition of the increased economic dependence on the inlet. Barnegat Inlet held a unique position of strategic regional and national importance. Maritime traffic to New York City, the gateway to the new world, relied upon Barnegat Light to navigate into New York harbor. The sheltered Barnegat Bay was a safe harbor and access point to inner bay ports, such as the Mullica and Toms rivers, down which came numerous commodities manufactured in the pine barrens, such as bog iron, and exported to the cities through Barnegat Bay. Cranberry Inlet, located between Ortley Beach and Seaside Heights, naturally opened by storm and tidal forces in 1750, was naturally closed again in 1812, cutting off a well-used and less treacherous entryway to the bay, making Barnegat Inlet the primary access point thereafter. The 1834 lighthouse was painted white, stood 40 feet tall, and was powered by a reflector system patented by Winslow Lewis, who also constructed the tower.

=== Brownsville ===
In 1854, John Maxon Brown, a wrecker from Manasquan, bought much of the land that makes up present-day Barnegat Light. This purchase included the acquisition of Herring House, which he renamed the Ashley House for his wife's family. The family owned so much of the tiny town that people in the area colloquially called it Brownsville during this time. The powerful inlet caused a southward drift that began to threaten the 1834 lighthouse, which was also in poor condition due to substandard construction and was the subject of voluminous complaints from mariners due to its weak light. The lighthouse collapsed into the inlet in 1857, but not before a temporary wooden tower had been put into service while a superior replacement lighthouse was erected from 1857 to 1859.

The Brown family left the island in the 1870s after John Ashley Brown, John M. Brown's son, by then a ship captain, died in a storm at sea. In 1874, the Brown's sold the Ashley House to "Uncle" Charlie Martin, the former manager and cook. The United States Life-Saving Service built Station No. 17 on East 5th street in 1872, replacing an 1840s house of refuge nearby. The new station was later expanded in the 1890s. In the late 1860s, a general store and post office was constructed near the intersection of West 4th Street and Central Avenue. The general store was originally run by Lloyd and Lucretia Butterworth and provided limited supplies—largely due to the difficulty in transporting goods to the remote Island location in then equally remote coastal New Jersey. In 1919, the general store was purchased by the Applegate family who ran it well into the 20th century.

=== Barnegat City ===
In 1881, the Barnegat City Improvement Company was formed by Benjamin Franklin Archer, William F. Bailey, and a group of Camden, New Jersey investors. They intended to capitalize on the success of Atlantic City, as well as the then-popular temperance and health resort movements. They laid out streets, housing lots, hotels, a port, and a railroad, calling their planned seaside resort Barnegat City, emulating its popular southern neighbor Atlantic City. Their vision enjoyed limited success, as the city increased its already established reputation as a small but popular destination for sailors, sport fishermen, and hunters from Philadelphia and New York City, who in the early 1880s arrived on regional rail lines for part of the way and a steamboat across the bay to waiting carriages on the Island. Or in the earliest days, by traditional horse-drawn carriage the entire way to the bay steamboats. The 1886 construction of a railroad from Whiting and Toms River to the Island made the trip faster and easier, but still not as direct or convenient as that built for Philadelphians to Atlantic City. Local concerns lobbied for years to have a direct rail route constructed, but those efforts failed to make the Island as convenient and affordable of a day-trip to those in Philadelphia as Atlantic City was. Those coming from New York City took a ferry to Long Branch, then railroad to Toms River, and finally a steamboat from Toms River down Barnegat Bay to Barnegat City. The SS Hesse, a ship chartered by the Pennsylvania Railroad, began providing transport into Barnegat City for passengers largely originating from New York City and Trenton. This ship was later replaced by the Connetquot. The Oceanic Hotel, Sunset Hotel (initially San Souci Hotel), and Social were built as part of the original BCIC plan. The Oceanic opened in 1882, the Sunset in 1883, and the Social in 1884. The large Oceanic Hotel, located on East 4th Street, would be moved 300 feet west barely a year after opening due to sudden erosion threatening the hotel, which was placed atop leveled dunes at the very edge of the beach.

The Ashley House was sold to John Warner Kinsey in 1882, who rebranded it the Kinsey Hotel. He sold the old hotel not long after, the Ashley being antiquated and badly in need of repairs to compete with its larger more modern new neighbors in town. The hotel stood empty until 1887 when it was torn down. Between 1884 and 1886, a direct railroad connection was completed to increase the Island's tourism capabilities. The first train reached Barnegat City on June 28, 1886. The lighthouse keeper's house was greatly expanded in 1894 by the Federal Lighthouse Bureau to house the head keeper, his two assistants, and their families. During the Spanish–American War, signal houses were hurriedly constructed up and down the east coast, one of which was built in Barnegat City whose staff were charged with watching the seas for signs of Spanish ships. The brief war ended, however, before the houses could be put into service.

Barnegat City became part of Long Beach Township after the township's establishment in 1899. In 1904, the city declared itself an independent borough and Barnegat City became the first officially recognized name for the storied old northern point of Long Beach Island.

In 1914, an automobile bridge was built next to the railroad bridge at the midpoint of the Island at Ship Bottom, eventually attracting more to the Island when roads and automobiles were plentiful but also increasing the devastating near term decline in railroad passenger and freight traffic vital to the Island's trade and tourist economy, as well as livelihoods of most residents. In 1919, the struggling Oceanic Hotel sold and the somewhat more successful Sunset Hotel, catering to seasonal water fowl hunters, was purchased by John Barber. In 1928, Kaetzel's Hotel and Bar was opened on West 7th Street by Paul and Toni Kaetzel. The bar was later purchased by Philadelphia bar owners Adamas "Pop" Kubelczikas and his wife Helena "Mom" Kubelczikas. They renamed the then bar and grill Kubel's Bar, which still operates today.

A severe winter storm in 1920 caused significant erosion of the shoreline from the lighthouse to East and West 8th streets on the bay and ocean side of Barnegat City, eroding the shore up to the base of the lighthouse and prompting the abandonment and removal of the keeper's house by the United States Lighthouse Service. The Oceanic Hotel owner planned to open it in the spring of 1920, but limited prospects for turning a profit and the dangerously close tides caused him to sell the hotel for salvage. Locals stripped and demolished the hotel a section at the time from the east end. The 1920 winter caused some damage to the hotel as well. Life-Saving Station No. 17 also had to be moved from its site at the end of East 5th Street to the middle of the block on East 7th Street. It was later replaced by a modern station across the street which still stands today as the Borough Hall. On the bay side, the port at 6th Street, populated by docks, boats, and fisherman and their families living in small cottages, began to erode as the inlet current wrapped around the contour of Barnegat City and scoured away at it from both sides. The disappearing town, as newspapers morbidly began writing of Barnegat City, which included frequent claims of the lighthouse near toppling and, in some sensationalist cases, claims that the lighthouse had toppled in a most recent storm, saw the end of the developers dreams from 1881. The block upon block of cottages they envisioned would be built, but it would take the next 60 years to be completed. In 1923, train service was discontinued from Barnegat City Junction at Ship Bottom to the entire north end of the Island, including the towns of Surf City and Harvey Cedars, and the tracks taken up shortly after due to low ridership, increasing maintenance costs to keep the aging railways passable, dilapidated locomotives and cars, and the growth of automobile traffic. This fate would follow for the southern branch of the Island railroad in 1935 when the train bridge was washed out in a nor'easter, while the regional shore lines would shutter in the 1940s.

A series of disasters in the area occurred during the 1930s, beginning with the destruction of the Sunset Hotel by fire in June 1932. On April 4, 1933, the Airship USS Akron crashed in the sea off Barnegat Light, resulting in the deaths of 73 of the airship's crew of 76, still the most deadly airship disaster on record. In the era of airships from the late 1910s to the 1940s, nearby Navy base Lakehurst operated as the east coast port for all lighter-than-air traffic, including international flights from legendary craft such as the Graf Zeppelin and the Hindenburg. The Barnegat lighthouse and the inlet acted as a navigational point for airships from Lakehurst, making them a common sight in the skies above Barnegat City and parts of the Island. During World War II, airships were often seen as part of merchant convoys, providing anti-submarine services.

Barnegat City's commercial fishing economy improved with a pound boat fishery opened by Captain Dick Myers in 1920, who built a dock at West 6th Street replacing the old eroded port. Also by the 1920s, a wave of immigration since 1900 had changed Barnegat City's makeup as fishermen from Norway, Sweden, and Finland came to local waters after hearing of its reputation and solicitations from Myers to work his pound nets. In 1927 these Scandinavian fisherman united to form the Independent Fish Company and bought land further south to build their own dock complex that spanned West 17th to West 20th streets and remains active today. During this period, gillnetting declined in popularity, but it would later gain a comeback in the 1950s. Also in the 1950s, dragger fishing was ended and tilefishing began, the latter taking into the early 1970s before it became a profitable fishery and backbone, along with scalloping, of the evolving Barnegat Light commercial fishing industry.

The Independent Fish Company docks are now known as Viking Village and today provide a combined shopping and industrial establishment with both handcrafted goods and fresh seafood. Catches typically consist of scallops, tuna, swordfish, tilefish, weakfish, monkfish, bluefish, shad, dogfish, and various other types of in-shore fish. In the 1960s and 1970s, foreign trawlers, many international, were permitted to fish in the area, coming within a few miles of shore and fishing out several key species. Nearly all of the cod have been fished out of the area along with blue fish. The scallop boat Lindsay L, docked at Viking Village, was used in the movie The Perfect Storm.

=== Barnegat Light ===
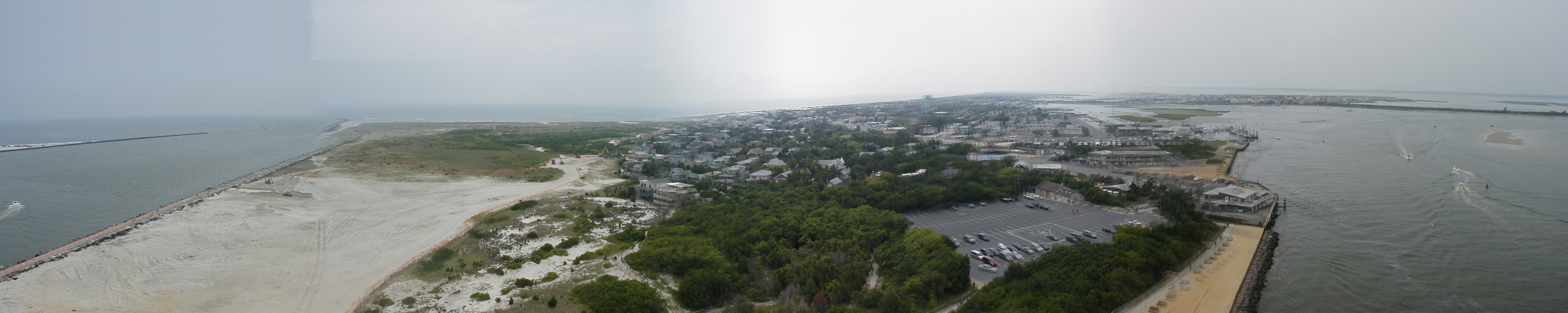
Looking southward from Barnegat Lighthouse

In 1948, Barnegat City was renamed as Barnegat Light after a referendum. The motivations for this renaming were both to honor the legacy of the lighthouse (which was decommissioned four years earlier) and to distinguish itself from nearby Barnegat Township. In 1950, the post office moved from the Applegate's general store, which was falling into disrepair, to another general store on 18th Street. The building it replaced had itself been a general store and a gas station, both owned by Jens Jensen in 1920 who had given it to John Englesen in 1940 as a trade for a house on 19th Street. The post office remained at 18th Street until its current location on 10th Street was opened in the early 1960s when a borough hall and municipal complex was constructed. Town meetings had previously been held at the closed Barnegat City schoolhouse since 1951 and also the Barnegat Light Volunteer Firehouse hall. The site of the first post office, the general store on 4th Street, was saved and updated in the ensuing decades, operating today as the Inlet Deli.

The continued threat of storms such as the Great Atlantic Hurricane of 1944 and the Ash Wednesday Storm of 1962 reinforced concerns about Barnegat Light's survival in the long term and the survival of the lighthouse and beachfront homes in the near term. The first attempt at stabilizing the shoreline came in 1939-40 when a combination of rock jetties and earthen dams were used to reroute the inlet current away from the shoreline. The massive effort succeeded and stopped the erosion that had doomed the eastern beach blocks, threatened the lighthouse, and erased the former port at 6th street. A diagonal jetty extending hundreds of yards NNE from East 8th Street forced the current far away from land before it entered the channel between the lighthouse and southern tip of Island Beach, while the damming of the existing current's channel along the backside of the Island between West 20th Street and High Bar, plus the damming of a channel between High Bar and an island WNW of the inlet, rerouted the current a mile north and west of Barnegat Light, sending it farther into the bay away from the town. The construction of the existing jetty in the early 1990s further stabilized the earlier work, straightening the southern jetty of the inlet and reclaiming virtually all of the eastern shoreline from East 8th Street to the lighthouse that was lost over the last century, much of which was not redeveloped and instead designated as parkland, which in 2020 included the addition of a bird sanctuary. The jetties have provided stabilization to the shoreline and especially the previously unstable and occasionally shallow inlet. To maintain the channel, the inlet requires annual dredging by the United States Army Corps of Engineers. In addition to the lighthouse, Barnegat Light continues to host a United States Coast Guard station, now located on the bay at West 6th Street, reflecting the continued presence of the former United States Life-Saving Service and its vital duties on the still treacherous waters of Barnegat Inlet and out on the Barnegat shoals. In line with the borough's history, its most prominent industries continue to be tourism and fishing.

== Geography ==
According to the United States Census Bureau, the borough had a total area of 1.20 square miles (3.10 km^{2}), including 0.83 square mile (2.15 km^{2}) of land and 0.37 square mile (0.95 km^{2}) of water (30.50%).

The borough borders Berkeley Township, Long Beach Township and Ocean Township. It is located on the northern tip of Long Beach Island and is bounded by Barnegat Bay on the west, the Atlantic Ocean to the east, the Barnegat Inlet to the north and the Long Beach Township neighborhood of Loveladies to the south.

== Demographics ==
Historical population
Census	Pop.	Note	%±
1910	70		—
1920	69		−1.4%
1930	144		108.7%
1940	225		56.3%
1950	227		0.9%
1960	287		26.4%
1970	554		93.0%
1980	619		11.7%
1990	675		9.0%
2000	764		13.2%
2010	574		−24.9%
2020	640		11.5%
2023 (est.)	652	▲	1.9%
Population sources: 1910–2000; 1910–1920 1910 1910–1930; 1940–2000; 2010 2020

=== 2010 census ===
The 2010 United States census counted 574 people, 274 households, and 184 families in the borough. The population density was 785.1 inhabitants per square mile (303.1/km^{2}). There were 1,282 housing units at an average density of 1,753.6 per square mile (677.1/km^{2}). The racial makeup was 97.74% (561) White, 1.05% (6) Black or African American, 0.00% (0) Native American, 0.00% (0) Asian, 0.00% (0) Pacific Islander, 1.05% (6) from other races, and 0.17% (1) from two or more races. Hispanic or Latino of any race were 1.92% (11) of the population.

Of the 274 households, 9.9% had children under the age of 18; 58.8% were married couples living together; 5.1% had a female householder with no husband present and 32.8% were non-families. Of all households, 29.9% were made up of individuals and 16.1% had someone living alone who was 65 years of age or older. The average household size was 2.06 and the average family size was 2.48.

7.3% of the population were under the age of 18, 6.8% from 18 to 24, 10.1% from 25 to 44, 34.5% from 45 to 64, and 41.3% who were 65 years of age or older. The median age was 60.3 years. For every 100 females, the population had 98.6 males. For every 100 females ages 18 and older there were 97.8 males.

The Census Bureau's 2006–2010 American Community Survey showed that (in 2010 inflation-adjusted dollars) median household income was $63,750 (with a margin of error of +/− $30,634) and the median family income was $104,375 (+/− $41,197). Males had a median income of $71,250 (+/− $36,607) versus $41,250 (+/− $11,770) for females. The per capita income for the borough was $44,933 (+/− $10,912). About 5.0% of families and 8.5% of the population were below the poverty line, including none of those under age 18 and 7.4% of those age 65 or over.

=== 2000 census ===
As of the 2000 United States census there were 764 people, 371 households, and 230 families residing in the borough. The population density was 1,056.8 inhabitants per square mile (408.0/km^{2}). There were 1,207 housing units at an average density of 1,669.6 per square mile (644.6/km^{2}). The racial makeup of the borough was 98.30% White, 0.52% African American, 0.26% Asian, 0.26% Pacific Islander, 0.39% from other races, and 0.26% from two or more races. Hispanic or Latino of any race were 0.79% of the population.

There were 371 households, out of which 15.9% had children under the age of 18 living with them, 55.0% were married couples living together, 3.2% had a female householder with no husband present, and 38.0% were non-families. 34.8% of all households were made up of individuals, and 19.7% had someone living alone who was 65 years of age or older. The average household size was 2.05 and the average family size was 2.60.

In the borough the population was spread out, with 14.4% under the age of 18, 4.5% from 18 to 24, 17.4% from 25 to 44, 29.5% from 45 to 64, and 34.3% who were 65 years of age or older. The median age was 55 years. For every 100 females, there were 103.7 males. For every 100 females age 18 and over, there were 99.4 males.

The median income for a household in the borough was $52,361, and the median income for a family was $66,406. Males had a median income of $52,917 versus $45,000 for females. The per capita income for the borough was $34,599. About 2.6% of families and 4.7% of the population were below the poverty line, including 13.5% of those under age 18 and 1.8% of those age 65 or over.

== Government ==
=== Local government ===
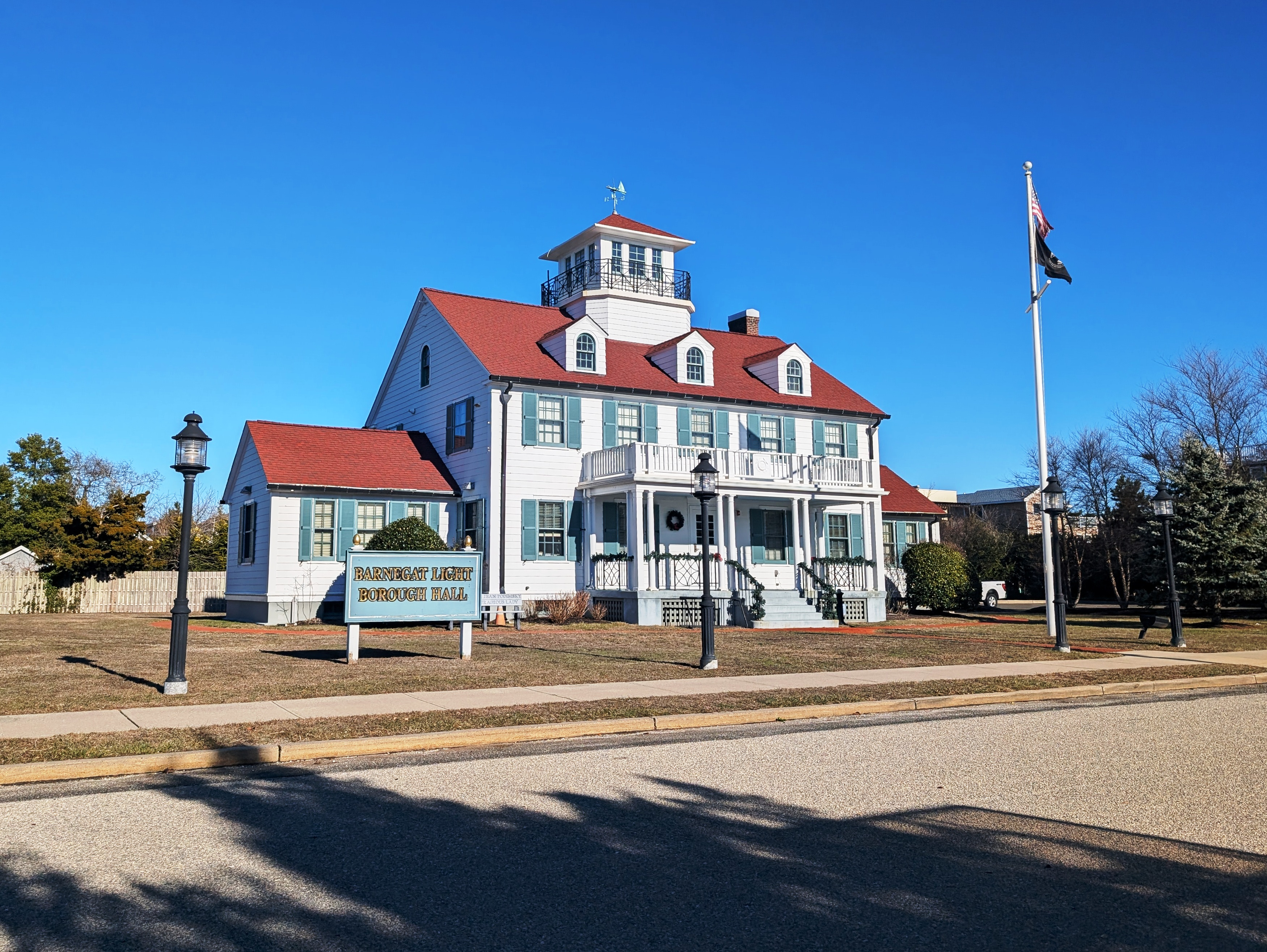
Barnegat Light Borough Hall

Barnegat Light is governed under the borough form of New Jersey municipal government, which is used in 218 municipalities (of the 564) statewide, making it the most common form of government in New Jersey. The governing body is comprised of the mayor and the borough council, with all positions elected at-large on a partisan basis as part of the November general election. The mayor is elected directly by the voters to a four-year term of office. The borough council includes six members elected to serve three-year terms on a staggered basis, with two seats coming up for election each year in a three-year cycle. The borough form of government used by Barnegat Light is a "weak mayor / strong council" government in which council members act as the legislative body with the mayor presiding at meetings and voting only in the event of a tie. The mayor can veto ordinances subject to an override by a two-thirds majority vote of the council. The mayor makes committee and liaison assignments for council members, and most appointments are made by the mayor with the advice and consent of the council.

As of 2026, the mayor of Barnegat Light is Republican Edwin Wellington Jr., who was appointed to serve a term of office ending December 31, 2026. Members of the Borough Council are Council President Michael W. Spark (R, 2027), Mary Ellen Foley (R, 2026), James M. Gutowski (R, 2028), Barry Mescolotto (R, 2028), Dorothy F. Reynolds (R, 2026) and Joseph Saburn (R, appointed to term expiring in 2027).

In October 2025, Ed Wellington took office as mayor for the term ending December 2026 to fill the seat that became vacant following the death of Kirk O. Larson the previous month.ref>Oglesby, Amanda. "Barnegat Light mourns sudden death of town's mayor of the people", Asbury Park Press, September 3, 2025. Accessed March 31, 2026. "This close-knit community was rocked Labor Day weekend when longtime Mayor Kirk O. Larson, who had led the borough for nearly 30 years, passed away suddenly, friends and municipal officials said. Larson, 71, was a month shy of three decades serving as Barnegat Light's mayor, said Councilman Ed Wellington." Later that month, Joseph Saburn was appointed to fill Wellington's council seat expiring in December 2027; he will serve in an interim basis until the November 2026 general election, when voters will select a candidate to fill the balance of the term of office.

The borough council selected Edwin Wellington Jr. in October 2013 to fill the vacant seat of Dave Bossi expiring in 2015. Wellington served on an interim basis until the November 2014 general election, when voters choose him to serve the balance of the term through December 2015.

==== Emergency services ====
Police protection in the borough is provided under contract by the Long Beach Township Police Department.

Barnegat Light is served by both a volunteer fire department as well as a volunteer first aid squad. The Barnegat Light Volunteer Fire Company, established in 1937, covers Barnegat Light, High Bar Harbor, and parts of Loveladies. The Barnegat Light First Aid Squad covers all of the north end of Long Beach Island ending at the Surf City North Beach border.

=== Federal, state and county representation ===
Barnegat Light is located in the 2nd Congressional district and is part of New Jersey's 9th state legislative district. Prior to the 2010 Census, Barnegat Light had been part of the 3rd Congressional District, a change made by the New Jersey Redistricting Commission that took effect in January 2013, based on the results of the November 2012 general elections.

For the 119th United States Congress, New Jersey's 2nd congressional district is represented by Jeff Van Drew (R, Dennis Township). New Jersey is represented in the United States Senate by Democrats Cory Booker (Newark, term ends 2027) and Andy Kim (Moorestown, term ends 2031).

For the 2026–2027 session, the 9th legislative district of the New Jersey Legislature is represented in the State Senate by Carmen Amato (R, Berkeley Township) and in the General Assembly by Greg Myhre (R, Stafford Township) and Brian E. Rumpf (R, Little Egg Harbor Township).

Ocean County is governed by a Board of County Commissioners composed of five members who are elected on an at-large basis in partisan elections and serving staggered three-year terms of office, with either one or two seats coming up for election each year as part of the November general election. At an annual reorganization held in the beginning of January, the board chooses a director and a deputy director from among its members. As of 2025, Ocean County's Commissioners (with party affiliation, term-end year and residence) are:

John P. Kelly (R, 2025, Eagleswood Township), Virginia E. Haines (R, 2025, Toms River), Robert Arace (R, Manchester Township, 2027) Jennifer Bacchione (R, Berkeley Township, 2027) and Frank Sadeghi (R, 2026, Toms River).

Constitutional officers elected on a countywide basis are: Clerk Scott M. Colabella (R, 2025, Barnegat Light), Sheriff Michael G. Mastronardy (R, 2025; Toms River) and Surrogate Jeffrey Moran (R, 2028, Beachwood).

=== Politics ===
As of March 2011, there were a total of 630 registered voters in Barnegat Light, of which 98 (15.6%) were registered as Democrats, 335 (53.2%) were registered as Republicans and 197 (31.3%) were registered as Unaffiliated. There were no voters registered to other parties. Among the borough's 2010 Census population, 109.8% (vs. 63.2% in Ocean County) were registered to vote, including 118.4% of those ages 18 and over (vs. 82.6% countywide).

Gubernatorial election results for Barnegat Light
Year	Republican		Democratic		Third party(ies)	
Year	No.	%	No.	%	No.	%
2025	271	54.53%	226	45.47%	0	0.00%
2021	251	54.92%	203	44.42%	3	0.66%
2017	190	54.13%	156	44.44%	5	1.42%
2013	263	76.68%	74	21.57%	6	1.75%
2009	231	61.27%	118	31.30%	28	7.43%
2005	198	59.10%	125	37.31%	12	3.58%

In the 2012 presidential election, Republican Mitt Romney received 58.6% of the vote (222 cast), ahead of Democrat Barack Obama with 40.4% (153 votes), and other candidates with 1.1% (4 votes), among the 381 ballots cast by the borough's 660 registered voters (2 ballots were spoiled), for a turnout of 57.7%. In the 2008 presidential election, Republican John McCain received 57.8% of the vote (294 cast), ahead of Democrat Barack Obama with 39.9% (203 votes) and other candidates with 1.0% (5 votes), among the 509 ballots cast by the borough's 665 registered voters, for a turnout of 76.5%. In the 2004 presidential election, Republican George W. Bush received 57.2% of the vote (281 ballots cast), outpolling Democrat John Kerry with 40.7% (200 votes) and other candidates with 0.9% (6 votes), among the 491 ballots cast by the borough's 680 registered voters, for a turnout percentage of 72.2.

Presidential Elections Results
Year	Republican	Democratic	Third Parties
2024	48.3% 277	50.8% 292	0.9% 5
2020	50.3% 280	48.5% 270	1.2% 5
2016	52.1% 244	44.7% 209	3.2% 15
2012	58.6% 222	40.4% 153	1.1% 4
2008	57.8% 294	39.9% 203	1.0% 5
2004	57.2% 281	40.7% 200	0.9% 6

In the 2013 gubernatorial election, Republican Chris Christie received 76.7% of the vote (263 cast), ahead of Democrat Barbara Buono with 21.6% (74 votes), and other candidates with 1.7% (6 votes), among the 350 ballots cast by the borough's 627 registered voters (7 ballots were spoiled), for a turnout of 55.8%. In the 2009 gubernatorial election, Republican Chris Christie received 60.5% of the vote (231 ballots cast), ahead of Democrat Jon Corzine with 30.9% (118 votes), Independent Chris Daggett with 6.3% (24 votes) and other candidates with 1.0% (4 votes), among the 382 ballots cast by the borough's 650 registered voters, yielding a 58.8% turnout.

United States Senate election results for Barnegat Light1
Year	Republican		Democratic		Third party(ies)	
Year	No.	%	No.	%	No.	%
2024	290	50.70%	282	49.30%	0	0.00%
2018	217	55.08%	172	43.65%	5	1.27%
2012	216	59.83%	141	39.06%	4	1.11%
2006	202	56.90%	145	40.85%	8	2.25%

United States Senate election results for Barnegat Light2
Year	Republican		Democratic		Third party(ies)	
Year	No.	%	No.	%	No.	%
2020	294	53.26%	253	45.83%	5	0.91%
2014	299	69.86%	126	29.44%	3	0.70%
2013	153	60.00%	100	39.22%	2	0.78%
2008	271	57.66%	189	40.21%	10	2.13%

== Education ==
In 1903, the Barnegat City School was built on West 5th Street and Central Avenue, consisting of a single room with bathrooms and coat closets in the entranceways, of which there was one for boys and one for girls. An older school based out of a residential cottage on West 3rd Street previously educated small classes of children from the 1880s. Shortly after the new school was opened, the former school and neighboring houses caught fire. The one-room school closed in 1951 at the end of the school year due to increasing class sizes after World War II and the plan to consolidate the Island town schools under one roof, which became the Ethel A. Jacobsen Elementary School in Surf City and later the additional LBI Grade School in Ship Bottom.

For pre-kindergarten through sixth grade, public school students attend the Long Beach Island Consolidated School District, which also serves students from Harvey Cedars, Long Beach Township, Ship Bottom and Surf City. As of the 2020–21 school year, the district, comprised of two schools, had an enrollment of 215 students and 30.7 classroom teachers (on an FTE basis), for a student–teacher ratio of 7.0:1. Schools in the district (with 2020–21 enrollment data from the National Center for Education Statistics) are Ethel Jacobsen School in Surf City with 111 students in pre-kindergarten to second grade and Long Beach Island Grade School in Ship Bottom with 125 students in grades 3–6. The district's board of education is comprised of nine members who are directly elected from the constituent municipalities on a staggered basis, with three members elected each year. Of the nine seats, one is elected from Barnegat Light.

Students in public school for seventh through twelfth grades attend the Southern Regional School District, which serves the five municipalities in the Long Beach Island Consolidated School District, along with students from Beach Haven and Stafford Township, as well as students from Ocean Township (including its Waretown section) who attend as part of a sending/receiving relationship. Schools in the district (with 2020–21 enrollment data from the National Center for Education Statistics) are Southern Regional Middle School with 902 students in grades 7–8 and Southern Regional High School with 1,975 students in grades 9–12. Both schools are in the Manahawkin section of Stafford Township.

== Transportation ==
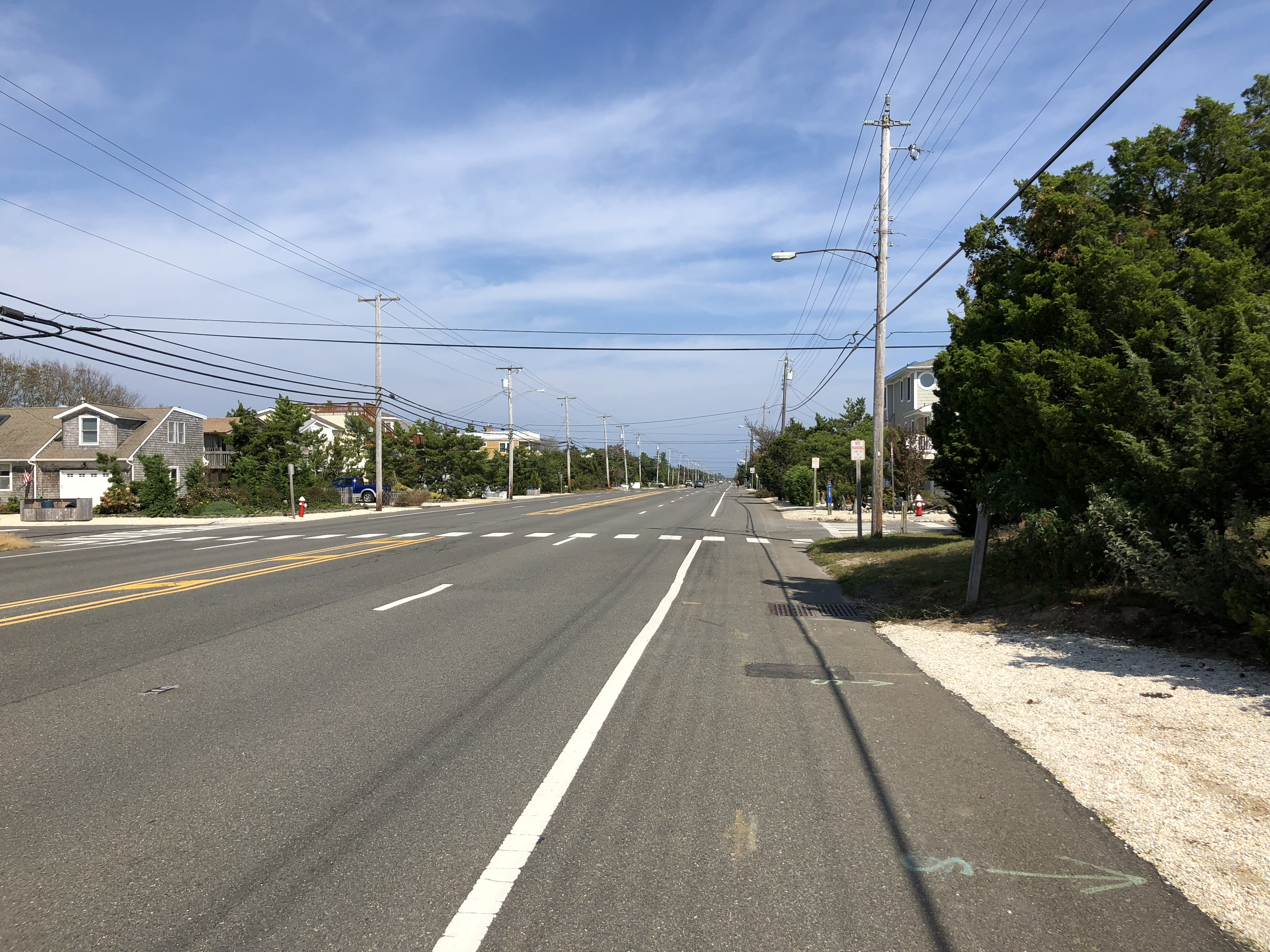
County Route 607 (Central Avenue) northbound in Barnegat Light

=== Roads and highways ===
As of May 2010, the borough had a total of 11.48 miles (18.48 km) of roadways, of which 7.46 miles (12.01 km) were maintained by the municipality and 4.02 miles (6.47 km) by Ocean County.

No Interstate, U.S. or state highways serve Barnegat Light. The main road serving the borough is County Route 607 (Central Avenue and Broadway).

=== Public transportation ===
Ocean County Ride provides bus service on the OC9 LBI North route between Barnegat Light and Manahawkin / Stafford Township.

The LBI Shuttle operates along Long Beach Boulevard, providing free service every 5 to 20 minutes from 10:00 AM to 10:00 PM. It serves the Long Beach Island municipalities / communities of Barnegat Light, Loveladies, Harvey Cedars, North Beach, Surf City, Ship Bottom, Long Beach Township, Beach Haven and Holgate.

== Climate ==
According to the Köppen climate classification system, Barnegat Light has a Humid subtropical climate (Cfa).

Climate data for Barnegat Light (39.7573, -74.1071), Elevation 3 ft (1 m), 1991–2020 normals, extremes 1981–2022
Month	Jan	Feb	Mar	Apr	May	Jun	Jul	Aug	Sep	Oct	Nov	Dec	Year
Record high °F (°C)	69.2 (20.7)	76.0 (24.4)	84.4 (29.1)	86.7 (30.4)	94.0 (34.4)	97.3 (36.3)	99.4 (37.4)	99.2 (37.3)	96.4 (35.8)	90.4 (32.4)	78.6 (25.9)	73.4 (23.0)	99.4 (37.4)
Mean daily maximum °F (°C)	41.1 (5.1)	42.5 (5.8)	48.2 (9.0)	58.0 (14.4)	67.4 (19.7)	77.0 (25.0)	82.6 (28.1)	81.0 (27.2)	75.4 (24.1)	64.9 (18.3)	54.7 (12.6)	46.2 (7.9)	61.7 (16.5)
Mean daily minimum °F (°C)	26.8 (−2.9)	28.0 (−2.2)	34.3 (1.3)	43.7 (6.5)	53.3 (11.8)	62.9 (17.2)	68.7 (20.4)	68.0 (20.0)	61.5 (16.4)	49.7 (9.8)	39.4 (4.1)	32.0 (0.0)	47.5 (8.6)
Record low °F (°C)	−4.6 (−20.3)	1.3 (−17.1)	7.6 (−13.6)	18.8 (−7.3)	35.1 (1.7)	45.6 (7.6)	51.2 (10.7)	47.0 (8.3)	41.8 (5.4)	30.6 (−0.8)	17.9 (−7.8)	0.8 (−17.3)	−4.6 (−20.3)
Average precipitation inches (mm)	3.82 (97)	3.33 (85)	4.63 (118)	3.54 (90)	3.62 (92)	3.85 (98)	4.30 (109)	4.65 (118)	3.80 (97)	4.34 (110)	3.47 (88)	4.70 (119)	48.07 (1,221)
Average snowfall inches (cm)	6.7 (17)	4.8 (12)	3.0 (7.6)	0.2 (0.51)	0.0 (0.0)	0.0 (0.0)	0.0 (0.0)	0.0 (0.0)	0.0 (0.0)	0.0 (0.0)	0.1 (0.25)	3.3 (8.4)	18.0 (46)
Average dew point °F (°C)	23.8 (−4.6)	24.4 (−4.2)	29.9 (−1.2)	38.9 (3.8)	50.0 (10.0)	60.9 (16.1)	66.1 (18.9)	65.3 (18.5)	59.8 (15.4)	48.1 (8.9)	37.1 (2.8)	29.5 (−1.4)	44.6 (7.0)
Source 1: PRISM
Source 2: NOHRSC (Snow, 2008/2009 - 2022/2023 normals)

Climate data for Atlantic City, NJ Ocean Water Temperature, 1911–present normals
Month	Jan	Feb	Mar	Apr	May	Jun	Jul	Aug	Sep	Oct	Nov	Dec	Year
Daily mean °F (°C)	39.7 (4.3)	38.5 (3.6)	41.9 (5.5)	48.7 (9.3)	56.4 (13.6)	64.7 (18.2)	68.9 (20.5)	73.1 (22.8)	72.2 (22.3)	64.1 (17.8)	53.6 (12.0)	45.2 (7.3)	55.7 (13.2)
Source: NCEI

== Ecology ==
According to the A. W. Kuchler U.S. potential natural vegetation types, Barnegat Light would have a dominant vegetation type of Northern Cordgrass (73) with a dominant vegetation form of Coastal Prairie (20).

== Notable people ==
People who were born in, residents of, or otherwise closely associated with Barnegat Light include:

- Matt Cook (born 1984), actor known mostly for his roles as Mo McCracken on the TBS sitcom Clipped and as Lowell in the CBS sitcom Man with a Plan
- Tom MacArthur (born 1960), former member of the U.S. House of Representatives who represented the 3rd Congressional District from 2015 to 2019
- Matt McAndrew (born 1990), singer-songwriter best known for his appearance in Season 7 of NBC's reality TV singing competition The Voice where he finished as the runner-up as part of team Adam

== Sources ==
- Karch, Mary. Under the Lighthouse – Memories of Barnegat City. 2004, Down The Shore Publishing
- Lloyd, John Bailey. Eighteen Miles of History on Long Beach Island. 1994, Down The Shore Publishing and The SandPaper, Inc.

Preceded by Island Beach State Park	Beaches of New Jersey	Succeeded by Loveladies
