= Clinton Historic District =

Clinton Historic District may refer to:

- Old Clinton Historic District, Clinton, Georgia
- Clinton Downtown Historic District (Clinton, Indiana)
- Downtown Clinton Historic District, Clinton, Massachusetts
- Clinton Downtown Historic District (Clinton, Michigan)
- Clinton Square Historic District, Clinton, Missouri
- Clinton Historic District (Clinton, New Jersey)
- Clinton Hill Historic District, New York, New York
- Clinton Hill South Historic District, New York, New York
- Clinton Street Historic District, Philadelphia

== See also ==
- Clinton Avenue Historic District (disambiguation)
- Clinton Commercial Historic District (disambiguation)
