= James Elwell =

James Elwell may refer to:

- James T. Elwell, Minnesota real estate developer and state legislator
- James William Elwell, American businessman and philanthropist
  - James W. Elwell (pilot boat), a Sandy Hook pilot boat
