= James W. and Lucy S. Elwell House =

Historic house in Brooklyn, New York

- U.S. Historic district – Contributing property
- New York City Landmark
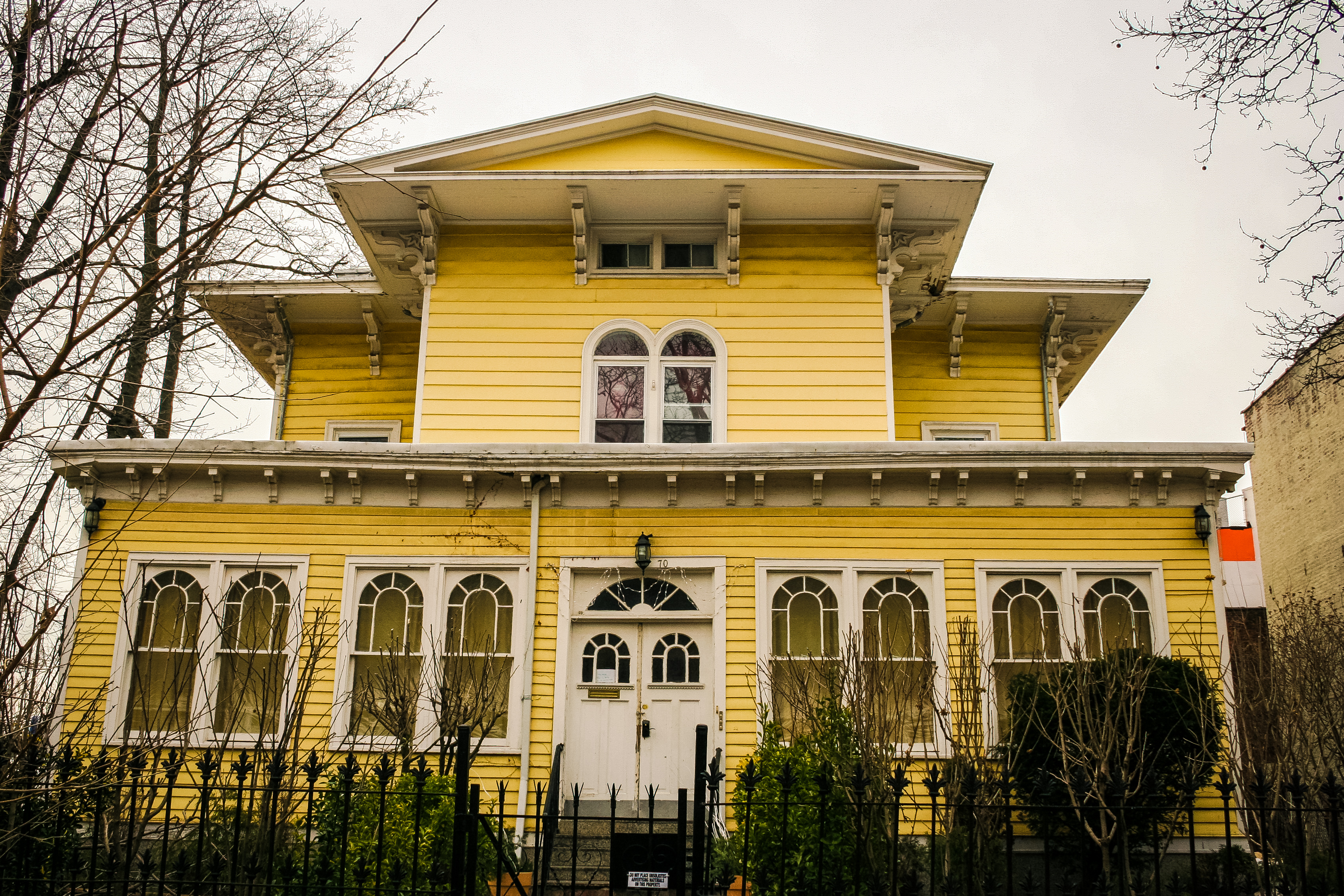

- Location within New York City Location within New York Location within the United States
- Location: 70 Lefferts Place, Brooklyn, New York
- Coordinates: 40°40′52″N 73°57′39″W
- Built: c. 1854
- Architectural style: Italianate
- Part of: Clinton Hill South Historic District (ID86001675)

Significant dates
- Designated CP: July 17, 1986
- Designated NYCL: December 12, 2006

The James W. and Lucy S. Elwell House is a historic Italianate-style home located in Clinton Hill, Brooklyn, New York City. It is currently located at 70 Leffferts Place in Brooklyn. It was built in the mid-1850s by merchant James W. Elwell and his wife, Lucy.

== History ==
In 1854, the Elwells bought a large parcel of land for $20,000 in the Lefferts Place area of South Clinton Hill. The original property extended south from that street to Atlantic Avenue, and the family also built a garden and a flower conservatory. Elwell tended the conservatory and was said to spend 30 minutes every day choosing a flower to put in his lapel. The house remained in family hands until 1939. By then the parcel of land had been reduced to its present size. An article authored by John A. Boyle featured in "American Gardening" discussed the view of Elwell's garden located just beyond the dining room windows. This garden was adorned with beds of foliage plants, including Echeveria secunda and Alternanthera foliage."

The Father Divine (Reverend Major Jealous Divine) Church, led by the African-American spiritual leader, bought the property and held it well into the 1970s. In 1986, it was placed in the National Register of Historic Places as part of the Clinton Hill South Historic District. In 2006, it was designated as an individual landmark by the Landmarks Preservation Commission which highlighted its "special character and a special historical and aesthetic interest and value as part of the development, heritage, and cultural characteristics of New York City".

The designation came as a result of the property owner's seeking a demolition permit for the house.

== Design and architecture ==
In the 1850s, when the Elwells bought and built the house, the Italianate style was the preferred one for New York merchants who wanted to live in the suburbs of the city. The house still maintains many of the style's signature features, such as a front bay, flat roof and square cupola. The original porch was wrapped around in 1939.

== See also ==
- List of New York City Designated Landmarks in Brooklyn
- National Register of Historic Places listings in Kings County, New York
