= Henlopen =

Henlopen may refer to:

- Cape Henlopen, Delaware, the southern cape of the Delaware Bay along the Atlantic coast of the United States
- USS Henlopen (SP-385), a United States Navy minesweeper and tug in commission from January to March 1918
