= James W. Elwell (pilot boat) =

New Jersey and Sandy Hook Pilot boat

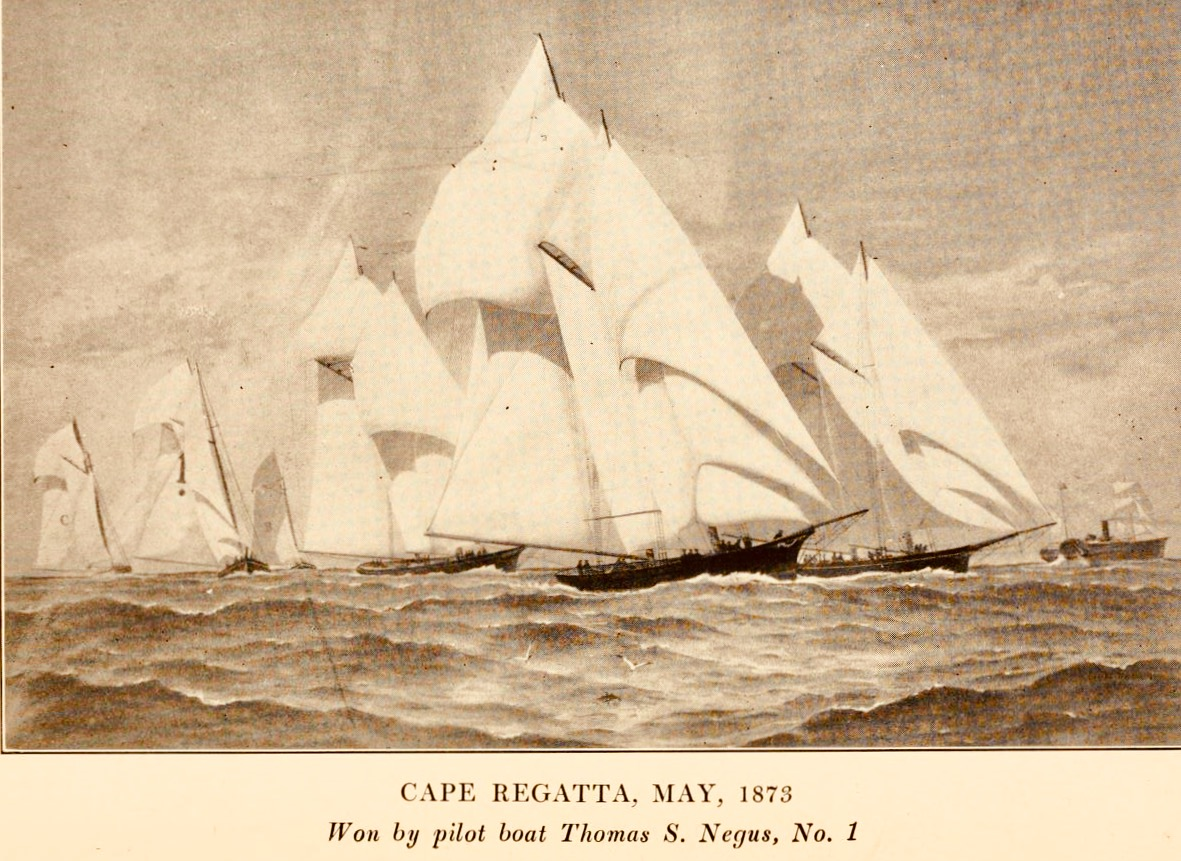
- Boats over the Cape May course (1873)

History

United States
- Name: James W. Elwell
- Namesake: James William Elwell
- Owner: New Jersey Pilots
- Operator: John Reardon, Charles E. Warner, George S. Watson, William Blach, Hiram Treat, John J. Goodbye, William Lewis, Peter Early, Joseph Hussey
- Builder: John A. Forsyth
- Cost: $15,000
- Launched: April 2, 1867
- Out of service: November 13, 1875
- Fate: Sank

General characteristics
- Class & type: schooner
- Tonnage: 74-tons TM
- Length: 90 ft 0 in (27.43 m)
- Beam: 22 ft 6 in (6.86 m)
- Depth: 8 ft 4 in (2.54 m)
- Propulsion: Sail
- Sail plan: 1,050 ft (320 m)
- Speed: 15 knots

James W. Elwell was a 19th-century two-masted Sandy Hook pilot boat, built in 1867 by John A. Forsyth at Mystic Bridge, New London, Connecticut for New Jersey and Sandy Hook maritime pilots. She raced for a $1,000 prize at the Cape May Regatta in 1873. She went ashore and was shipwrecked on North Beach Haven, New Jersey in 1875.

== Construction and service ==
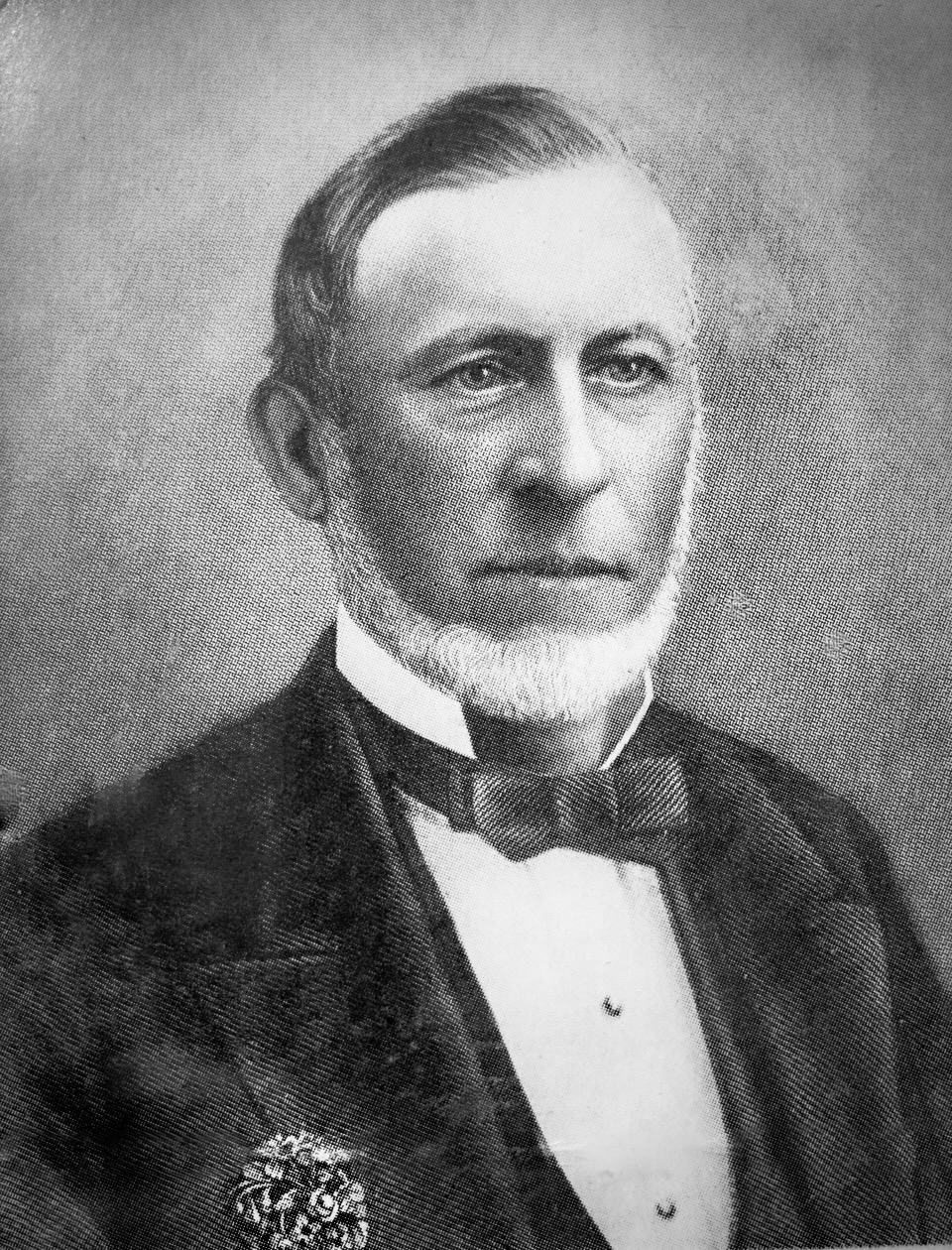
James William Elwell (1820–1899), shipping merchant and owner of James W. Elwell & Co.; namesake of the pilot boat James W. Elwell.

The James W. Elwell was a pilot-boat No. 7, built in 1867 by John A. Forsyth, at Mystic Bridge, New London, Connecticut for New Jersey and Sandy Hook pilots. Forsyth, built the yacht L' Hirondelle, which was owned by S. Dexter Bradford. The cabin of the boat was made of hard and choice woods put together by John Bennett of Mystic Bridge. She had 1,050 ft (320 m) of canvas in her sails. The dishes and glassware were prepared with her name on it. She had features that were common to the yacht L'Hirondelle.

On April 2, 1867, she went on a trial trip from New York City with a large party of guests past Sandy Hook, as far as the Highlands. She was a fast boat, her average speed was 15 knots. The pilot boat Francis Perkins, No. 13 was seen on the return home and the two boats raced back to the city. Captain Charles E. Warner was Master of the boat. Pilots that owned the boat were: John Reardon, Charles E. Warner, George S. Watson, William Blach, Hiram Treat, John J. Goodbye, William Lewis, and Peter Early, boat-keeper. Among the quests on board were James William Elwell of James W. Elwell & Co., J. W. Mott, and others.

On January 29, 1871, the British bark Kate Smith went ashore on the coast of New Jersey, hear Little Egg Harbor, seventy miles from New York. Eight of the crew and Sandy Hook pilot Joseph Hussey from the pilot boat James W. Elwell, No. 7 were on board when the vessel went down.

The James W. Elwell was registered as a pilot Schooner with the Record of American and Foreign Shipping, from 1871 to 1876. Her ship master was Charles E. Warner; her owners were the Pilots' Association; built in 1867 at Mystic Bridge, Connecticut; and her hailing port was the Port of New York. Her dimensions were 90 ft. in length; 22.6 ft. breadth of beam; 8.4 ft. depth of hold; and 74-tons Tonnage.

On October 9, 1873, the James W. Elwell, No. 7, was one of the boats that participated in the Cape May Ocean Regatta, which was a race from Owl's Head Point around to Cape May Lighthouse in New Jersey, and back to the Sandy hook Lightship. The race was sponsored by Joseph F. Loubat, who was a yachtsman, that offered the Bennett cup and $1,000 for first place. Commodore of the New York Yacht Club James Gordon Bennett Jr. presented the prizes. Captain Charles E. Warner sailed the Elwell, which came in third place. The yacht Enchantress won first place, and the pilot-boat Thomas S. Negus second place. Of the pilot-boats, the Thomas S. Negus took first place and the Widgeon second, the Mary E. Fish third, the James W. Elwell fourth, and the Edmund Blunt was last.

== End of service ==
On November 5, 1875, the pilot-boat James W. Elwell, No. 7, went ashore on North Beach Haven, New Jersey and was abandoned. Her hull was firmly imbedded in the sand and the owners claimed a total loss. All items of value were saved.

== See also ==
- List of Northeastern U. S. Pilot Boats
