= Fabre Line =

- House flag

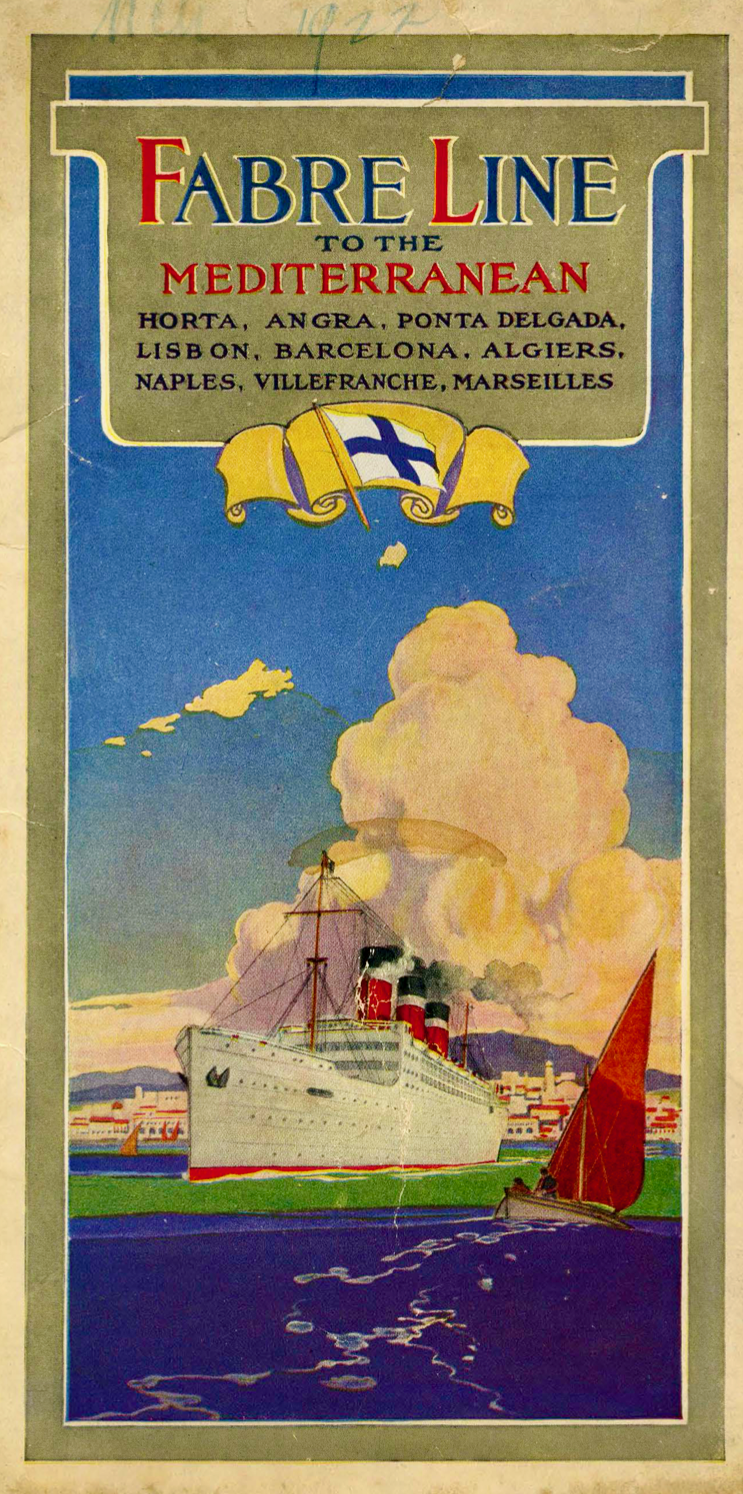
- Type: Fabre Line to the Mediterranean
- Industry: Shipping, transportation
- Founded: 1881; 145 years ago
- Headquarters: Marseille, France
- Area served: Transatlantic, Mediterranean, Northern Europe
- Key people: Cyprian Fabre
- Products: Transatlantic crossings, world voyages, leisure cruises

The Fabre Line or Compagnie Française de Navigation à Vapeur Cyprien Fabre & Compagnie was a French shipping line formed in 1881 by Cyprien Fabre. It began operating a small fleet of sailing ships in 1865. Its ports of call included New York, NY; Providence, RI; Boston, MA; Ponta Delgada, Madeira, and Lisbon, Portugal; Piraeus and Salonica, Greece; Algiers, Algeria; Beirut, Lebanon; Naples and Palermo, Italy; Alexandria, Egypt; Jaffa and Haifa, Palestine; Constantinople, Turkey; Monaco; and Marseilles, France.

In 1886, the James W. Elwell & Co., became the agents of the Fabre Line of freight and passenger steamers between Mediterranean ports and New York. In April 1911, the James W. Elwell & Co., as general agents of the Fabre Line, announced that the line had launched a mail, passenger and freight service between New York and Portugal. This new service opened up Portugal and Spain to tourism in the United States.

In June 1911, Fabre Line steamships began trans-Atlantic service to India Point in Providence, Rhode Island. Between June 30, 1912, and June 30, 1913, Fabre brought almost 12,000 mostly Italian and Portuguese immigrants to Providence's Lonsdale Dock. The route was so popular that Fabre built an additional pier in 1914. Service continued until 1934.

The Fabre Line was the only transatlantic route to southern New England.

On 21 May 1930 Fabre Line's Asia, having brought 700 Algerian pilgrims to Jeddah for the Hajj and then loaded some 1,500 pilgrims, c. 1,200 of them Yemenis returning to Aden and c. 300 from French Somaliland returning to French Somaliland, caught fire in Jeddah harbour. At least 112 pilgrims died, possibly many more.

It became the Compagnie Générale de Navigation à Vapeur in 1933 under the helm of Jean Alfred Fraissinet. Jean Alfred Fraissinet, owner of the Nouvelle Société Maritime de Navigation à Vapeur (Compagnie Fraissinet) married Mathilde Cyprien-Fabre. In 1930, the two shipping firms, as well as a third line, integrated operations to mutually increase their commercial competitiveness.
