= Clinton Commercial Historic District =

Clinton Commercial Historic District may refer to:

- Clinton Commercial Historic District (Clinton, Arkansas)
- Clinton Commercial Historic District (Clinton, North Carolina)
- Clinton Commercial Historic District (Clinton, South Carolina)

== See also ==
- Clinton Historic District (disambiguation)
