= SS West Pocasset =

20th century steam cargo ship

Coordinates: 58°30′N 19°40′W

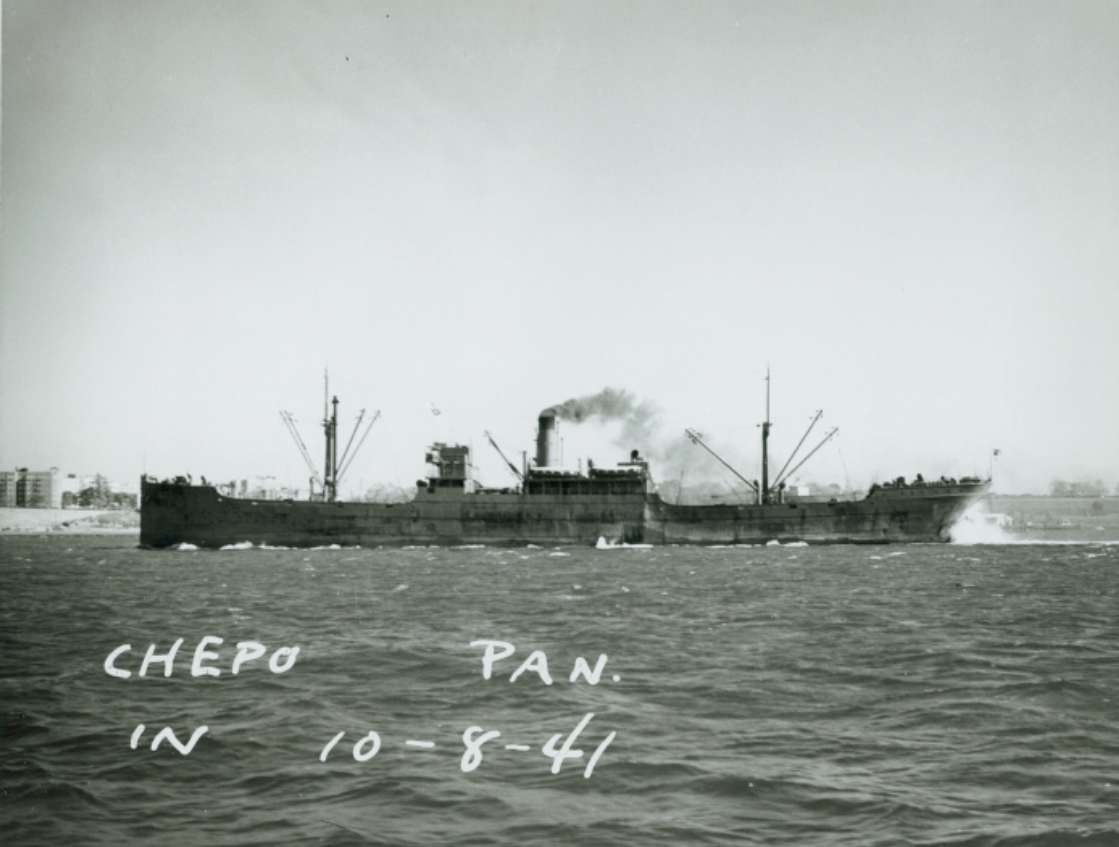
- SS Chepo in Newport News, October 1941.

History

United States
- Name: West Pocasset (1919–1941); Chepo (1941–1942)
- Owner: USSB (1919–1936); MARCOM (1936–1941); United States Line (1941–1942)
- Operator: Pacific Steamship Co. (1919); James W. Elwell & Co. (1920–1921); North Atlantic Transport Co. (1941–1942)
- Ordered: 14 August 1918
- Builder: Northwest Steel Co., Portland
- Cost: $1,864,045.96
- Yard number: 34
- Laid down: 5 May 1919
- Launched: 18 August 1919
- Sponsored by: Miss Rosemary Mahoney
- Commissioned: 9 October 1919
- Maiden voyage: 5 November 1919
- Homeport: Portland (1919–1941); Panama (1941–1942)
- Identification: US Official Number 218963; Call sign LTBM (1919–1933); Call sign KLCV (1934–1941); Call sign HPSN (1941–1942)
- Fate: Sunk, 14 January 1942

General characteristics
- Class & type: Design 1013 Cargo ship
- Tonnage: 5,707 GRT; 3,515 NRT; 8,583 DWT
- Length: 409.8 ft (124.9 m)
- Beam: 54.2 ft (16.5 m)
- Depth: 27.7 ft (8.4 m)
- Installed power: 605 Nhp, 2,800 shp
- Propulsion: 2 x Midwest Engineering Co. steam turbines double reduction geared to one screw
- Speed: 11 1/2 knots (13.2 mph; 21.3 km/h)

West Pocasset was a steam cargo ship built in 1919 by Northwest Steel Company of Portland for the United States Shipping Board as part of the wartime shipbuilding program of the Emergency Fleet Corporation (EFC) to restore the nation's Merchant Marine. The freighter was operated sparingly on the United States to Europe routes during the first two years of her career before being laid up. The ship was briefly reactivated in 1929 but was again laid up next year and remained idle for the next ten years. In January 1941 the freighter was sold together with four other vessels to the United States Line and was put under operation by its fully owned Panama-registered subsidiary to carry war matériel and supplies between Canada and United Kingdom and renamed Chepo. In early January 1942 while on one of her regular convoy trips, she was torpedoed and sunk by German submarine U-43 with the loss of seventeen men.

== Design and construction ==
After the United States entry into World War I, a large shipbuilding program was undertaken to restore and enhance shipping capabilities both of the United States and their Allies. As part of this program, EFC placed orders with nation's shipyards for a large number of vessels of standard designs. Design 1013 cargo ship was a standard cargo freighter of approximately 8,800 tons deadweight designed by Skinner & Eddy Corp. and adopted by USSB.

West Pocasset was part of the order for four vessels placed by USSB with Northwest Steel Co. on 14 August 1918. The vessel was laid down at the shipbuilder's yard on 5 May 1919 and launched on 18 August 1919 (yard number 34), with fifteen year-old Miss Rosemary Mahoney being the sponsor. Similar to many other vessels ordered by the Shipping Board during these years and built by the West Coast shipyards, she was given a name that began with the word West to reflect their West Coast origin.

Similar to all vessels of this class the ship was shelter-deck type and had two main decks. She had her machinery situated amidships and had five main holds which allowed for the carriage of a variety of goods and merchandise. The vessel also possessed all the modern machinery for quick loading and unloading of cargo from five large hatches, including ten winches, eleven booms and a large number of derricks. She was also equipped with wireless apparatus and submarine signal system and had electrical lights installed along the decks.

As built, the ship was 409.8 feet (124.9 m) long (between perpendiculars) and 54.2 feet (16.5 m) abeam, and had a depth of 27.7 feet (8.4 m). West Pocasset was originally assessed at 5,707 GRT and 3,515 NRT and had deadweight of approximately 8,600. The vessel had a steel hull with double bottom throughout with exception of her machine compartment, and two Parsons-type steam turbines rated at 2,800 shp double reduction geared to one screw that moved the ship at speeds up to 11 1/2 knots (13.2 mph; 21.3 km/h). The steam for the engine was supplied by three Scotch marine boilers fitted for both coal and oil fuel.

The six hour long sea trials were held in the Columbia River on 8 October 1919 with the ship performing satisfactorily and achieving an average speed of 11.25 knots over a measured mile. Following their successful completion, West Pocasset was handed over to her owners next day.

== Operational history ==
Upon acceptance by USSB West Pocasset was allocated to the Pacific Steamship Company to transport flour to New York. The loading started soon after the ship acceptance and was finalized by the end of October. West Pocasset sailed out of Astoria on 28 October 1919 loaded with over 7,700 tons of flour on her loaded trial trip, but had her thrust bearings burnt out almost immediately and had to be towed back to port for repairs. After finalizing repairs, the freighter departed for another loaded trial trip on November 4 and after successfully completing it returned to Astoria to disembark the inspectors. West Pocasset sailed out on her maiden trip in the early morning of 5 November 1919 bound for New York, and after an uneventful journey arrived at her destination on December 1. While on her voyage the freighter was chartered together with several other ships by the American Committee for Relief in the Near East to transport grain to Russian Black Sea ports as part of the hunger relief program for Armenia. West Pocasset loaded cargo of seed wheat and departed New York on December 10 bound for Novorossiysk and Batoum. The ship spent next several months visiting Constantinople and various Black Sea ports before proceeding back to United States via United Kingdom. West Pocasset departed Liverpool on her return trip on 12 June 1920 bound for New York. While en route, on 23 June 1920 she encountered another Shipping Board vessel, Zaca, with her boilers and engines disabled, approximately 1,000 miles east of Sandy Hook. West Pocasset took Zaca into tow and safely brought her into New York on June 30. Upon return the freighter was allocated to France & Canada Line but due to ongoing shipping crisis caused by overabundance of available tonnage and scarcity of cargo, this allocation was soon rescinded and the vessel was temporarily laid up in New London. West Pocasset was reactivated a couple of months later and was allocated to James W. Elwell & Co. to sail on their Spanish routes. Upon loading her cargo the freighter cleared from New York on November 17 bound for Barcelona. After visiting various ports in the Mediterranean she returned to Brooklyn in ballast on 1 February 1921. The vessel remained in New York for several months before being shifted to anchorage in Jamaica Bay at the end of April. West Pocasset as well as many other vessels in the Shipping Board's possession remained berthed at the anchorage through the end of 1920s.

In early September 1929 USSB awarded contracts for general repairs and condenser repairs to two New York area companies as the vessel was being prepared for reentering the service. However, the onset of the Great Depression considerably shortened the service life of the vessel. After collecting general cargo at various ports along the Atlantic seaboard, West Pocasset departed New York on 9 July 1930 bound for Bordeaux and St. Nazaire. She sailed out from France on July 30 and after reaching United States was again laid up, this time at James River anchorage in Norfolk where the freighter would remain for the next ten years.

With the start of World War II in Europe United States adopted Neutrality Act which effectively prohibited American shippers from direct sailing into designated war zones such as United Kingdom. United States Line, one of the bigger operators between the US and the United Kingdom, was significantly hampered by the Act which effectively grounded their fleet. They immediately asked Maritime Commission to allow them to transfer nine of their vessels to Panamanian registry. The transfer was initially approved but under pressure and sharp criticism from a number of congressmen and Secretary of State Cordell Hull the shipping line withdrew its application. Shortly thereafter, United States Line tried to lobby Maritime Commission to allow it to sell the same vessels to their subsidiary, North Atlantic Transport Company, a Norwegian-registered corporation. These vessels were eventually sold to Belgian company, Société Maritime Anversoise, in February 1940. By early 1941, however, most of the transferred ships were lost to enemy action, and the United States Line sought to augment their fleet from the laid up vessels belonging to Maritime Commission. In December 1940 a large number of laid up vessels was offered for sale to British shipping companies. The bidding opened in early January 1941, with United States Line jumping in and placing a bid on five of the vessels, including West Pocasset. The deal was struck on 23 January 1941 and West Pocasset and four other ships of similar size were sold to United States Line for $1,328,384. These vessels then were sold to North Atlantic Transport Company, a subsidiary of United States Line, now a Panamanian registered company. All ships were subsequently renamed after various towns of Panama, with West Pocasset becoming Chepo.

After repairs and reconditioning, Chepo proceeded to Sydney where she loaded general cargo and left it on 1 June 1941 as part of convoy SHX 130 before joining in with the main part of convoy HX 130 bound for Liverpool. After safe passage and unloading, the freighter returned to Halifax as part of convoy OB 345 on 26 July 1941. The ship conducted two more journeys in 1941 between Halifax and United Kingdom as part of convoys HX 144 and HX 158. She travelled back to North America in convoys ON 16 and ON 43 which were dispersed in the mid-Atlantic with the vessels continuing on independently.

=== Sinking ===
Chepo departed Liverpool on her last voyage on 8 January 1942 as part of convoy ON 55 carrying 1,769 tons of general cargo bound for Boston and New York. The ship was under command of captain Hezekiah Spurrell and had a crew of thirty eight. The trip was uneventful until the convoy ran into a strong storm south of Iceland on January 13 which significantly slowed it down. The convoy was detected on the same day by the German submarine U-43 under command of Wolfgang Lüth which began shadowing it. U-43 commenced attack on the convoy in the early morning of January 14 in the stormy conditions with poor visibility, first sinking British cargo ship SS Empire Surf. At 04:53 Chepo was suddenly hit on starboard side by a torpedo fired from U-43. The resulting explosion open a wide hole in the vessel's hull and brought down the aft mast and antenna, preventing the vessel from sending a S.O.S. signal. Chepo started quickly settling by the stern forcing the survivors to hastily abandon the ship in starboard lifeboats and one raft. Sixteen crewmembers were trapped in the poop quarters and could not escape. The master on hearing the cries for help coming from the abandoned vessel, went back to investigate and went down with the ship. Chepo sunk approximately ten minutes after the attack. At about 05:50 British corvette HMS Sunflower showed up and started picking up the survivors.

== Bibliography ==
- Crowell, Benedict; Robert Forrest Wilson (1921). The Road to France: The Transportation of Troops and Military Supplies, 1917–1918. How America Went to War: An Account From Official Sources of the Nation's War Activities, 1917–1920. New Haven: Yale University Press. OCLC 18696066.
