= James William Elwell =

American businessman, Merchant

James W. Elwell
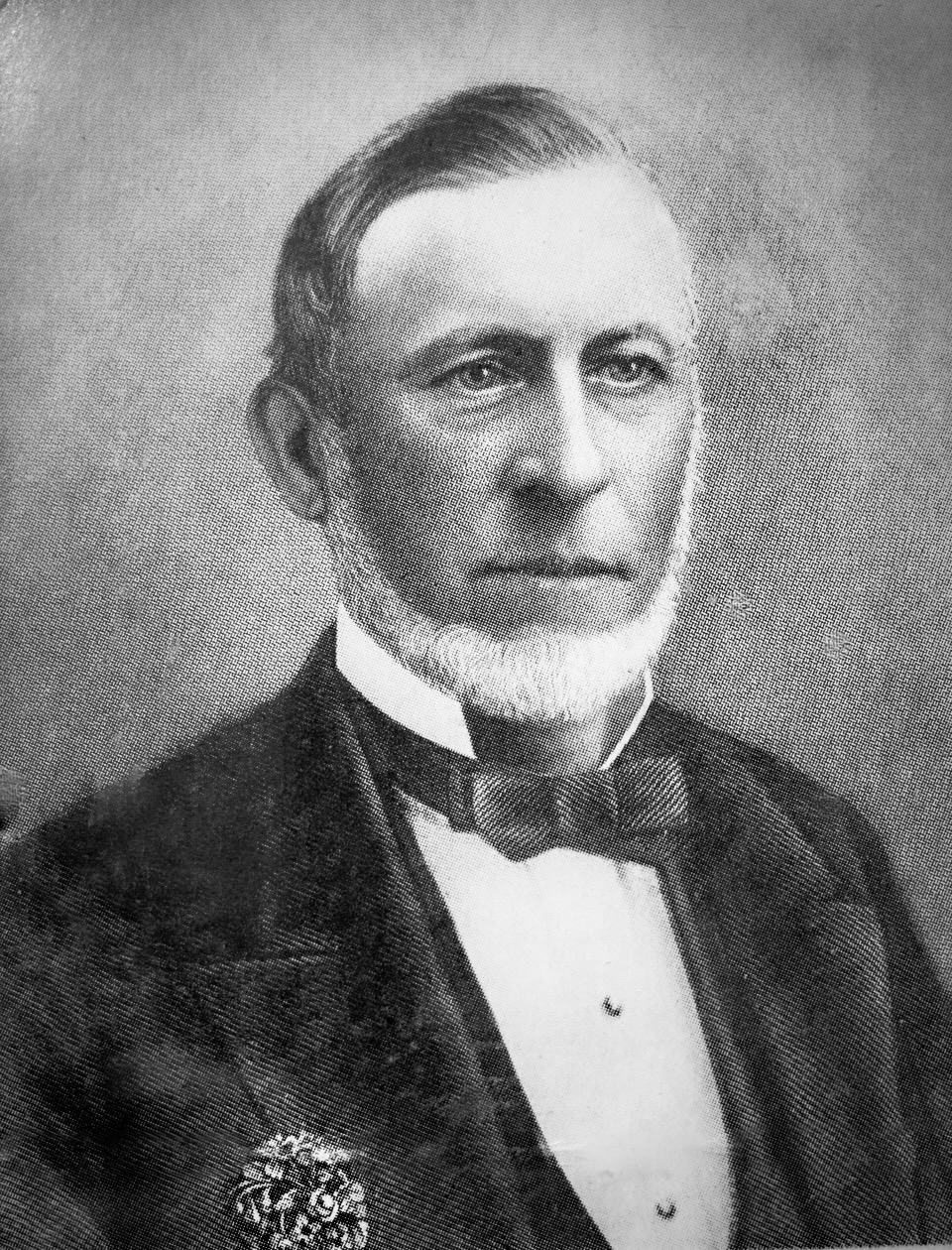
- James W. Elwell (1820–1899
- Born: August 27, 1820; Bath, Maine, US
- Died: September 2, 1899 (aged 79); Brooklyn, New York City, US
- Occupation: Shipping merchant
- Known for: Philanthropy
- Spouse(s): Olivia Peterson Robinson (1844), Lucy E. R. Stinson (1852)

Signature
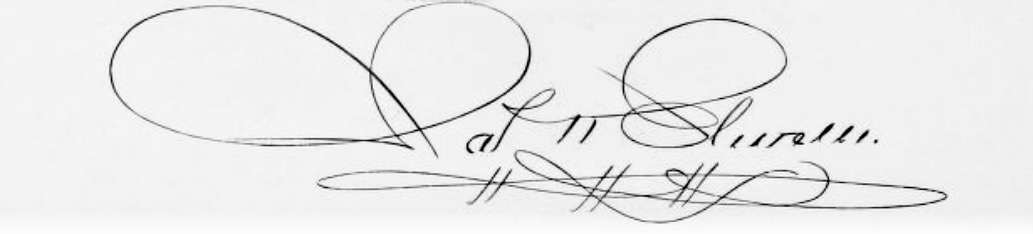

James William Elwell (August 27, 1820 – September 2, 1899) was a 19th-century American businessman and philanthropist. Elwell was the owner of James W. Elwell & Co., a shipping firm at 57 South Street, Manhattan. He was one of the oldest members of the New York Chamber of Commerce. He was known as a philanthropist who helped to found some of Brooklyn's best institutions. Elwell and his wife built the James W. and Lucy S. Elwell House in the national historic district in Clinton Hill, Brooklyn. The pilot boat James W. Elwell was named in his honor.

== Early life ==
James W. Elwell was born the shipbuilding city of Bath, Maine, on August 27, 1820. He was the son of John Elwell (1790–1847). The Elwell ancestors landed in Boston in 1636. His mother was Mary L. Sprague (1794–1857) comes from the Sprague ancestors that landed at Plymouth, Massachusetts in 1628. James Elwell went to the Bath High School.

Elwell married Olivia Peterson Robinson on July 16, 1844, in Bath, Maine, and had three children. Olivia died in 1851 at age 32. He married his second wife, Lucy E. R. Stinson, on May 6, 1852, in Bath, Maine, and had three more children.

== Career ==
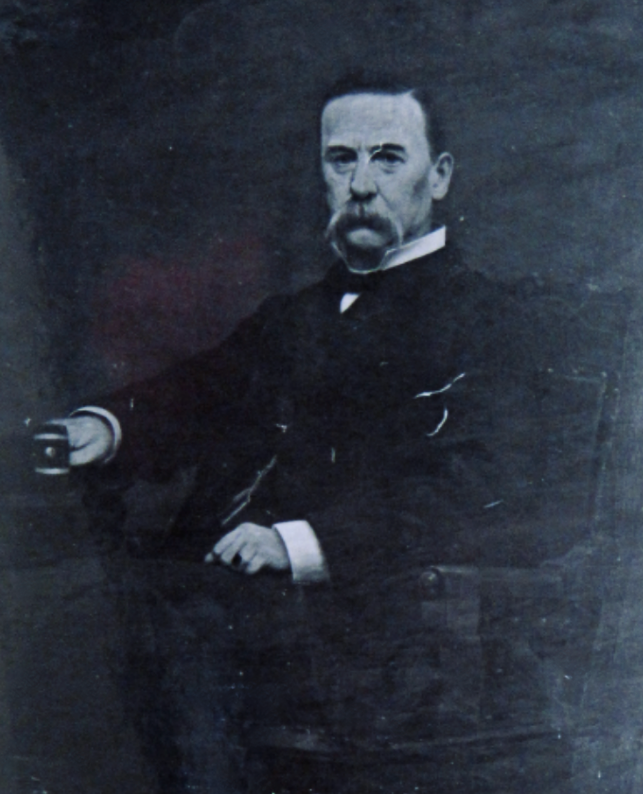
Brother Charles Frederick Elwell (1830–1907)

The family firm, John Elwell & Co., was founded in 1821 in Bath, Maine, by James's father, John Elwell. It imported broadcloths, dry goods, crockery, hardware, rum, and other products from the British West Indies. In 1833, his father moved to Brooklyn, New York, with his family, to pursue work in the freight and commission business. Soon after his arrival he formed a partnership with James B. Taylor as Elwell & Taylor, at 84 Coffe House Slip, New York City. James W. Elwell worked for James R. Gibson as a clerk in his store where he received $50 (equivalent to $1,668 in 2025) per year. Elwell stayed with Gibson until 1838. On May 1, 1838, James Elwell and his brother Charles Frederick Elwell (1830–1907) joined his father in the family shipping business as a junior clerk. The firm was called John Elwell & Co., which was located at 57 South Street in New York City. The firm established lines of sailing vessels for the ports of Savannah, Charleston, Mobile, and New Orleans.

=== James W. Elwell and Co. ===
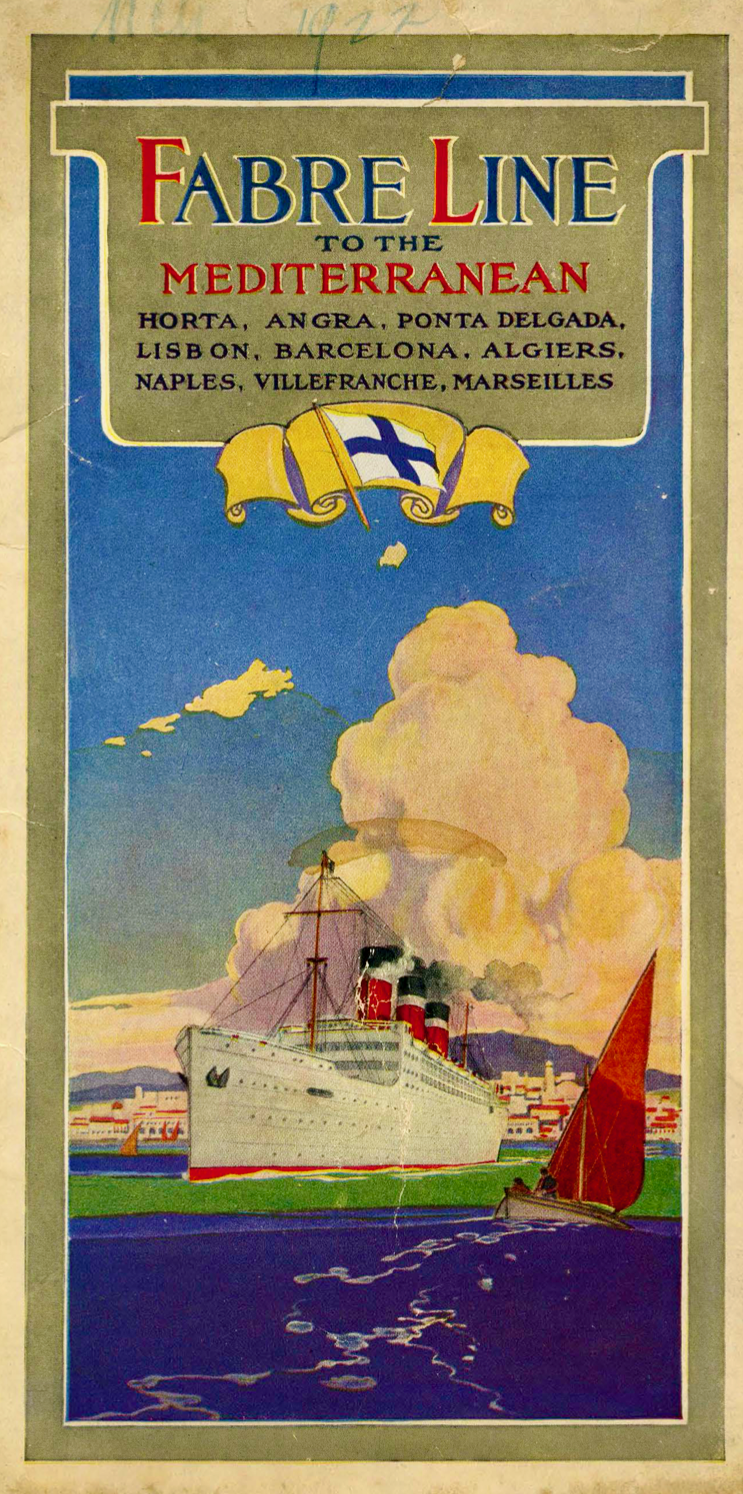
Fabre Line brochure.

On July 15, 1847, his father died while on board the bark Nautilus, at the foot of Wall Street, when he was struck on the head by the main boom. Elwell died five days later from injuries incurred in the accident. After the accidental death of John Elwell in 1847, James took over the business alone and renamed the firm James W. Elwell & Co., which would remain in operation well into the twentieth century. His brother, Charles Elwell rejoined the firm in 1852 and stayed until 1885. The firm entered the shipping trade, controlling lines of vessels to the East and West Indies, South America, and European ports. In 1838, James Elwell became a member of the New York Produce Exchange, which served a network of produce and commodities dealers across the United States. He served on its arbitration committee for five terms. He was elected a member of the Chamber of Commerce in 1855.

In 1867, The pilot-boat James W. Elwell, No. 7, was named in honor of Elwell. On her trial trip from New York City, on April 2, 1867, James W. Elwell was on board along with a delegation of other prominent men.

In 1886, the firm became the agent for the Fabre Line of freight and passenger steamers between Mediterranean ports and New York. The business grew and became the most important Line out of New York to the Mediterranean.

=== Lefferts Place ===
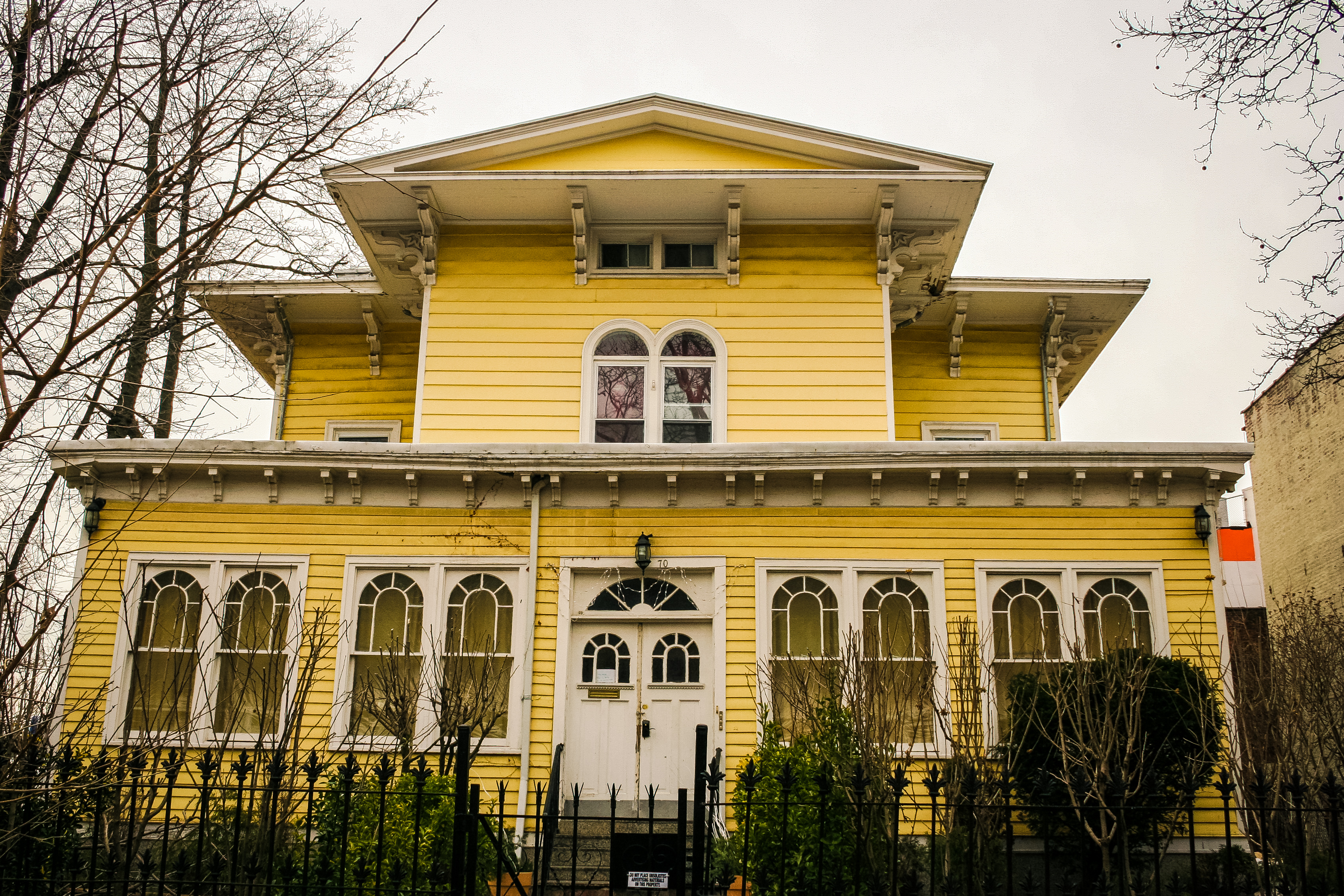
Home of James W. and Lucy S. Elwell House at 70 Lefferts Place, Brooklyn, New York.

Elwell lived at 70 Lefferts Place, Brooklyn, New York, for over forty years and had a conservatory for his garden and flowers on his property. He took the Wall Street Ferry to work. He loved flowers and was known as "Bouquet Elwell."

In 1854, Elwell and his wife Lucy built the wood-framed Italianate villa that is in the national historic district in Clinton Hill, Brooklyn in the Clinton Hill South Historic District. The house is one of the two oldest houses on Lefferts Place. The house became a designated individual landmark by the Landmarks Preservation Commission on December 12, 2006, and is called the James W. and Lucy S. Elwell House.

=== Chamber of Commerce and director ===
He was the fourth oldest member of the New York Chamber of Commerce becoming a member in 1845, which he held up to his death. He was a director and trustee of several insurance and railroad companies and banks, including: the Ship Owners' Association of New York, the Marine Bank, the Union Mutual Insurance Association, the Mariners' Savings Institution, the Niagara Fire Insurance Company, the Great Western Insurance Company, the Galena and Chicago Railroad Company, the Great Eastern Railroad Company, Chicago and Indiana Railroad Company and Atlantic and Pacific Railroad company.

=== Philanthropist ===
Elwell was known as a philanthropist, being a director and trustee of several charitable undertakings in the New York district. He gave $3,000,000 to charity over his lifetime. He helped fund some of Brooklyn's best institutions, including Graham Institute, member of the advisory board of the Brooklyn Orphan Asylum and the Industrial Home for Children. For twenty years he was a trustee of the American Congregational Union; vice president and trustee of the Seamen's Friend Society of the City of New York; Mission and Track Society of Brooklyn; Brooklyn Dispensary; New York Port Society; founder of the Helping Hand Night Mission, which he helped organize; the Home for Friendless Woman and Children of Brooklyn; trustee of Clinton Avenue Congregational Church; founder of the Fresh Air Fund now the Seaside Home; president of the board of council of the Mariners' Family Asylum of Staten Island and trustee of the Children's Aid Society and Industrial School of Brooklyn.

== Death ==
At age 79, he died on September 2, 1899, of pneumonia at his home in Brooklyn, New York. He had three daughters that survived after his death. His funeral was at his home with Rev. T. B. McLeod conducting the service. His interment was at Chestnut Hill, Green-Wood Cemetery.

== Legacy ==
James's brother Charles continued with the James W. Elwell & Co., until his death in 1907.

On December 12, 1917, the United States Navy acquired the USS Henlopen at New York City from her owner, James W. Elwell & Company of New York City, for use on the section patrol as a minesweeper and tug during World War I. In 1922, the SS West Pocasset was reactivated and allocated to James W. Elwell & Co. for sailing on its Spanish routes.

In 1920, the business was incorporated under the state as James W. Elwell & Co., Inc. Howard E. Jones was elected president, Harvey G. Perine vice-president, Rodrique Joly, treasurer, and Robert W. Swanson, secretary.

On December 29, 1954, Robert W. Sawson, then president of James W. Elwell & Co., became chairman of the board and his son, David W. Swanson, became president.

== See also ==
- List of Northeastern U. S. Pilot Boats
