= Clinton Hill Historic District =

Historic district in Brooklyn, New York

- U.S. National Register of Historic Places
- U.S. Historic district
- New York State Register of Historic Places
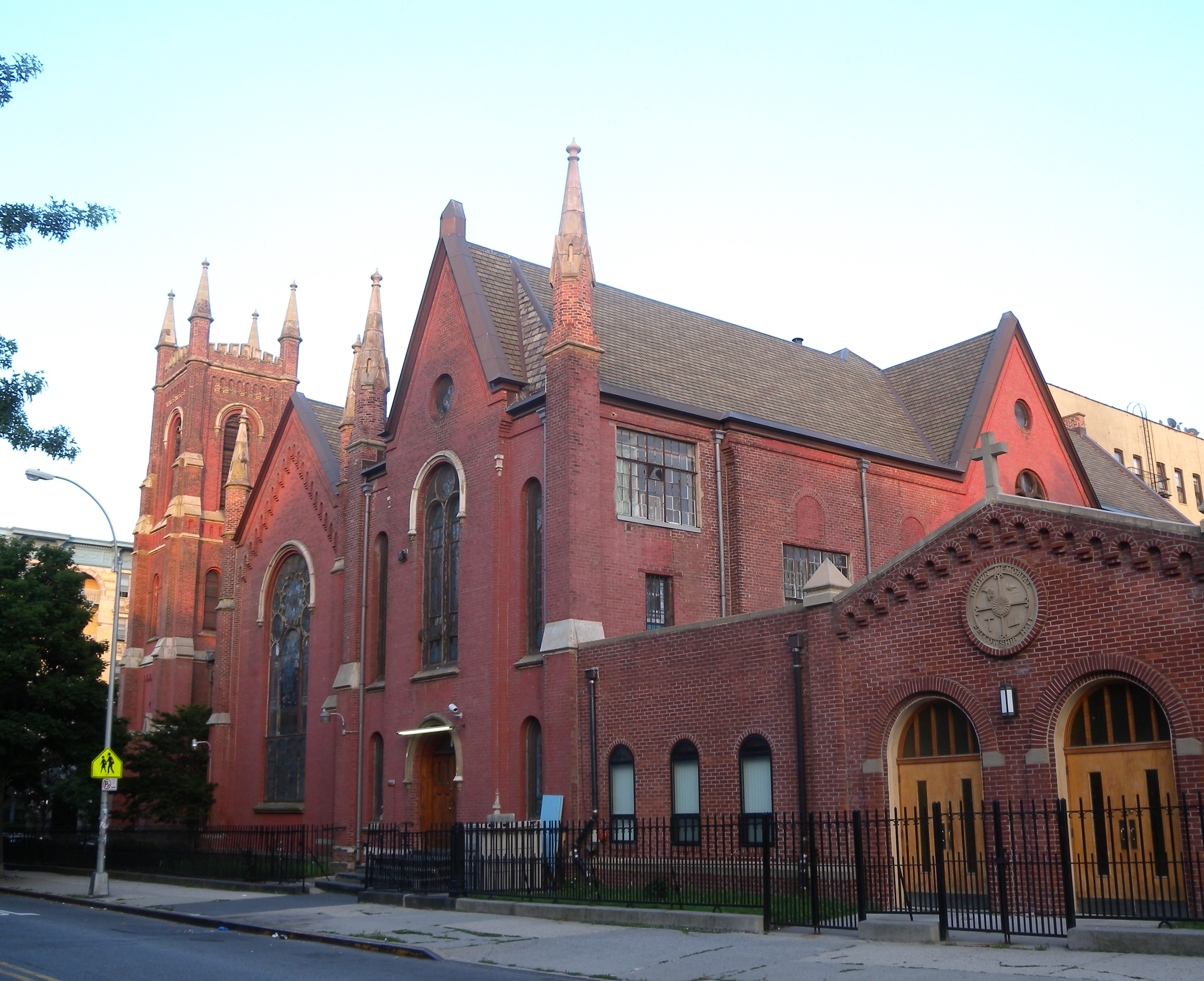
- Brown Memorial Baptist Church, Gates and Washington Avenues

- Location within New York City Location within New York Location within the United States
- Location: Roughly bounded by Willoughby and Grand Avenues, Fulton Street and Vanderbilt Avenue, Brooklyn, New York
- Coordinates: 40°41′14″N 73°57′55″W
- Area: 100 acres (40 ha)
- Architect: Multiple
- Architectural style: Late 19th and 20th Century Revivals, Late Victorian
- NRHP reference No.: 85001335

Significant dates
- Added to NRHP: June 19, 1985
- Designated NYSRHP: February 7, 1985

Clinton Hill Historic District is a national historic district in Clinton Hill, Brooklyn, in New York City. It consists of 1,063 largely residential contributing buildings built between the 1840s and 1930 in popular contemporary and revival styles. Buildings include freestanding mansions, row houses, and apartment buildings. The district includes the mansions of Clinton Avenue, built in the 1870s and 1880s. The most prominent of these are linked to Charles Pratt, who built a mansion for himself at 232 Clinton Avenue in 1874, the year his Charles Pratt & Company was acquired by Standard Oil, and one each as wedding presents for three of his four sons. These four mansions can be seen on Clinton Avenue between DeKalb and Willoughby. The rest of the historic district is noted for its prominent Italianate and Beaux-Arts rowhouses. The Clinton Hill South Historic District was listed in 1986.

St. Mary's Episcopal Church at 220 Classon Avenue in Clinton Hill, built c.1859, and the Mechanics Temple, which was built at 67 Putnam Avenue as the Lincoln Club in 1889, are both part of the historic district.

Other buildings in the Historic District include a Gothic Revival wooden house at 284 Clinton Avenue, built c.1854; an Italianate brick and stone villa dating from c.1850 at 447 Clinton Avenue, intact runs of mid-19th century rowhouses on Grand Avenue, St. James Place and Cambridge Place as well as on DeKalb Avenue and Waverly Avenue; mansions from the "Gold Coast" era in the 200 to 400 blocks of Clinton Avenue; and at 367 Washington Avenue; and apartment houses on Clinton Avenue.

Other contributing buildings include churches, schools, a former home for elderly women, and stores.

It was listed on the National Register of Historic Places in 1985.

== See also ==
- Clinton Hill South Historic District
