= Clinton Avenue Historic District =

Clinton Avenue Historic District may refer to:

- Clinton Avenue Historic District (Albany, New York), listed on the National Register of Historic Places (NRHP) in New York
- Clinton Avenue Historic District (Kingston, New York), now part of the Kingston Stockade District
