= North Beach Haven, New Jersey =

Populated place in Ocean County, New Jersey, US

- Census-designated place
- Location of North Beach Haven in Ocean County highlighted in red (left). Inset map: Location of Ocean County in New Jersey highlighted in orange (right).

- Location in Ocean County Location in New Jersey Location in the United States
- Coordinates: 39.600412°N 74.211614°W
- Country: United States
- State: New Jersey
- County: Ocean
- Township: Long Beach

Area
  - Total: 1.83 sq mi (4.74 km^{2})
  - Land: 1.81 sq mi (4.70 km^{2})
  - Water: 0.015 sq mi (0.04 km^{2}) 0.85%
- Elevation: 3.3 ft (1 m)

Population (2020)
  - Total: 2,198
  - Density: 1,210.7/sq mi (467.47/km^{2})
- Time zone: UTC−05:00 (Eastern (EST))
  - Summer (DST): UTC−04:00 (Eastern (EDT))
- FIPS code: 34-52410
- GNIS feature ID: 02389563

North Beach Haven is an unincorporated community and census-designated place (CDP) constituting a part of the Jersey Shore community of Long Beach Township, in southern Ocean County, in the U.S. state of New Jersey. The CDP is situated on Long Beach Island, a barrier island separating Barnegat Bay from the Atlantic Ocean. It contains the section of Long Beach Township south of Ship Bottom but north of Beach Haven. It includes the neighborhoods of Brant Beach, Beach Haven Crest, Brighton Beach, Peahala Park, Beach Haven Park, Haven Beach, The Dunes, Beach Haven Terrace, Beach Haven Gardens, and Spray Beach.

As of the 2020 United States census, North Beach Haven's population was 2,198, a decrease of 37 (−1.7%) from the 2,235 recorded at the 2010 census, which in turn had reflected a decline of 92 (−7.9%) from the 2,427 counted in the 2000 census.

== Geography ==
According to the United States Census Bureau, the CDP had a total area of 1.831 square miles (4.74 km^{2}), including 1.815 square miles (4.70 km^{2}) of land and 0.016 square miles (0.041 km^{2}) of water (0.85%).

== Climate ==
According to the Köppen climate classification system, North Beach Haven has a humid subtropical climate (Cfa) with hot, moderately humid summers, cool winters and year-around precipitation. Cfa climates are characterized by all months having an average mean temperature above 32.0 °F (0.0 °C), at least four months with an average mean temperature at or above 50.0 °F (10.0 °C), at least one month with an average mean temperature at or above 71.6 °F (22.0 °C) and no significant precipitation difference between seasons. During the summer months in North Beach Haven, a cooling afternoon sea breeze is present on most days, but episodes of extreme heat and humidity can occur with heat index values at or above 95.0 °F (35.0 °C). During the winter months, episodes of extreme cold and wind can occur with wind chill values below 0.0 °F (−17.8 °C). The plant hardiness zone at North Beach Haven Beach is 7a with an average annual extreme minimum air temperature of 4.3 °F (−15.4 °C). The average seasonal (November–April) snowfall total is 12 to 18 inches (30 to 46 cm), and the average snowiest month is February which corresponds with the annual peak in nor'easter activity.

Climate data for North Beach Haven Beach, NJ (1981-2010 Averages)
Month	Jan	Feb	Mar	Apr	May	Jun	Jul	Aug	Sep	Oct	Nov	Dec	Year
Mean daily maximum °F (°C)	40.3 (4.6)	42.4 (5.8)	49.1 (9.5)	57.8 (14.3)	68.1 (20.1)	77.3 (25.2)	82.7 (28.2)	81.4 (27.4)	75.5 (24.2)	64.9 (18.3)	55.0 (12.8)	45.2 (7.3)	61.7 (16.5)
Daily mean °F (°C)	33.2 (0.7)	35.3 (1.8)	41.6 (5.3)	50.5 (10.3)	60.4 (15.8)	69.8 (21.0)	75.4 (24.1)	74.3 (23.5)	68.0 (20.0)	56.9 (13.8)	47.6 (8.7)	38.0 (3.3)	54.3 (12.4)
Mean daily minimum °F (°C)	26.2 (−3.2)	28.1 (−2.2)	34.1 (1.2)	43.1 (6.2)	52.6 (11.4)	62.2 (16.8)	68.1 (20.1)	67.2 (19.6)	60.5 (15.8)	48.8 (9.3)	40.1 (4.5)	30.8 (−0.7)	46.9 (8.3)
Average precipitation inches (mm)	3.25 (83)	3.05 (77)	4.01 (102)	3.45 (88)	2.89 (73)	2.78 (71)	3.84 (98)	4.13 (105)	2.91 (74)	3.47 (88)	2.95 (75)	3.40 (86)	40.13 (1,019)
Average relative humidity (%)	67.2	65.0	63.7	64.6	67.5	71.6	71.1	72.8	71.6	70.2	68.6	67.8	68.5
Average dew point °F (°C)	23.5 (−4.7)	24.7 (−4.1)	30.2 (−1.0)	39.0 (3.9)	49.6 (9.8)	60.2 (15.7)	65.4 (18.6)	65.0 (18.3)	58.5 (14.7)	47.3 (8.5)	37.8 (3.2)	28.3 (−2.1)	44.2 (6.8)
Source: PRISM

Climate data for Atlantic City, NJ Ocean Water Temperature (20 SW North Beach Haven)
Month	Jan	Feb	Mar	Apr	May	Jun	Jul	Aug	Sep	Oct	Nov	Dec	Year
Daily mean °F (°C)	37 (3)	35 (2)	42 (6)	48 (9)	56 (13)	63 (17)	70 (21)	73 (23)	70 (21)	61 (16)	53 (12)	44 (7)	54 (12)
Source: NOAA

== Ecology ==
According to the A. W. Kuchler U.S. potential natural vegetation types, North Beach Haven would have a dominant vegetation type of Northern Cordgrass (73) with a dominant vegetation form of Coastal Prairie (20).

== Demographics ==
Historical population
Census	Pop.	Note	%±
1980	2,652		—
1990	2,413		−9.0%
2000	2,427		0.6%
2010	2,235		−7.9%
2020	2,198		−1.7%
Population sources: 1950 1960 1970; 1980 1990 2000; 2010 2020

North Beach Haven first appeared as a census designated place in the 1980 U.S. census.

=== Racial and ethnic composition ===
North Beach Haven CDP, New Jersey – Racial and ethnic composition Note: the US Census treats Hispanic/Latino as an ethnic category. This table excludes Latinos from the racial categories and assigns them to a separate category. Hispanics/Latinos may be of any race.
Race / Ethnicity (NH = Non-Hispanic)	Pop 2000	Pop 2010	Pop 2020	% 2000	% 2010	% 2020
White alone (NH)	2,341	2,086	2,068	96.46%	93.33%	94.09%
Black or African American alone (NH)	5	4	2	0.21%	0.18%	0.09%
Native American or Alaska Native alone (NH)	0	1	0	0.00%	0.04%	0.00%
Asian alone (NH)	5	11	20	0.21%	0.49%	0.91%
Native Hawaiian or Pacific Islander alone (NH)	0	0	0	0.00%	0.00%	0.00%
Other race alone (NH)	0	2	6	0.00%	0.09%	0.27%
Mixed race or Multiracial (NH)	9	10	38	0.37%	0.45%	1.73%
Hispanic or Latino (any race)	67	121	64	2.76%	5.41%	2.91%
Total	2,427	2,235	2,198	100.00%	100.00%	100.00%

=== 2020 census ===
As of the 2020 census, North Beach Haven had a population of 2,198. The median age was 63.2 years. 7.5% of residents were under the age of 18 and 46.1% were 65 years of age or older. For every 100 females there were 91.1 males, and for every 100 females age 18 and over there were 90.3 males.

100.0% of residents lived in urban areas, while 0.0% lived in rural areas.

There were 1,108 households in North Beach Haven, of which 9.2% had children under the age of 18 living in them. Of all households, 52.7% were married-couple households, 17.5% were households with a male householder and no spouse or partner present, and 27.1% were households with a female householder and no spouse or partner present. About 33.9% of all households were made up of individuals, and 19.0% had someone living alone who was 65 years of age or older.

There were 6,017 housing units, of which 81.6% were vacant. The homeowner vacancy rate was 3.7% and the rental vacancy rate was 53.4%.

=== 2010 census ===
The 2010 United States census counted 2,235 people, 1,115 households, and 673 families in the CDP. The population density was 1,231.7 people per square mile (475.6 people/km^{2}). There were 6,214 housing units at an average density of 3,424.5 units per square mile (1,322.2 units/km^{2}). The racial makeup was 96.47% (2,156) White, 0.18% (4) Black or African American, 0.04% (1) Native American, 0.49% (11) Asian, 0.00% (0) Pacific Islander, 2.10% (47) from other races, and 0.72% (16) from two or more races. Hispanic or Latino of any race were 5.41% (121) of the population.

Of the 1,115 households, 10.0% had children under the age of 18; 51.9% were married couples living together; 5.4% had a female householder with no husband present and 39.6% were non-families. Of all households, 35.5% were made up of individuals and 19.6% had someone living alone who was 65 years of age or older. The average household size was 2.00 and the average family size was 2.53.

10.3% of the population were under the age of 18, 4.4% from 18 to 24, 14.1% from 25 to 44, 33.5% from 45 to 64, and 37.7% who were 65 years of age or older. The median age was 59.7 years. For every 100 females, the population had 96.6 males. For every 100 females ages 18 and older there were 97.7 males.

=== 2000 census ===
As of the 2000 United States census there were 2,427 people, 1,208 households, and 735 families living in the CDP. The population density was 535.5 people/km^{2} (1,387 people/mi^{2}). There were 5,850 housing units at an average density of 1,290.7 units/km^{2} (3,343 units/mi^{2}). The racial makeup of the CDP was 98.56% White, 0.29% African American, 0.21% Asian, 0.41% from other races, and 0.54% from two or more races. Hispanic or Latino of any race were 2.76% of the population.

There were 1,208 households, out of which 13.3% had children under the age of 18 living with them, 51.5% were married couples living together, 7.5% had a female householder with no husband present, and 39.1% were non-families. 35.3% of all households were made up of individuals, and 20.2% had someone living alone who was 65 years of age or older. The average household size was 2.01 and the average family size was 2.55.

In the CDP the population was spread out, with 12.7% under the age of 18, 4.4% from 18 to 24, 18.8% from 25 to 44, 28.6% from 45 to 64, and 35.5% who were 65 years of age or older. The median age was 56 years. For every 100 females, there were 89.2 males. For every 100 females age 18 and over, there were 87.4 males.

The median income for a household in the CDP was $44,643, and the median income for a family was $55,833. Males had a median income of $41,071 versus $32,361 for females. The per capita income for the CDP was $29,752. About 5.3% of families and 5.8% of the population were below the poverty line, including 9.3% of those under age 18 and 5.1% of those age 65 or over.

Preceded by Ship Bottom	Beaches of New Jersey	Succeeded by Beach Haven
