= Clinton Hill, Brooklyn =

Neighborhood in New York City

Clinton Hill
- Neighborhood in Brooklyn
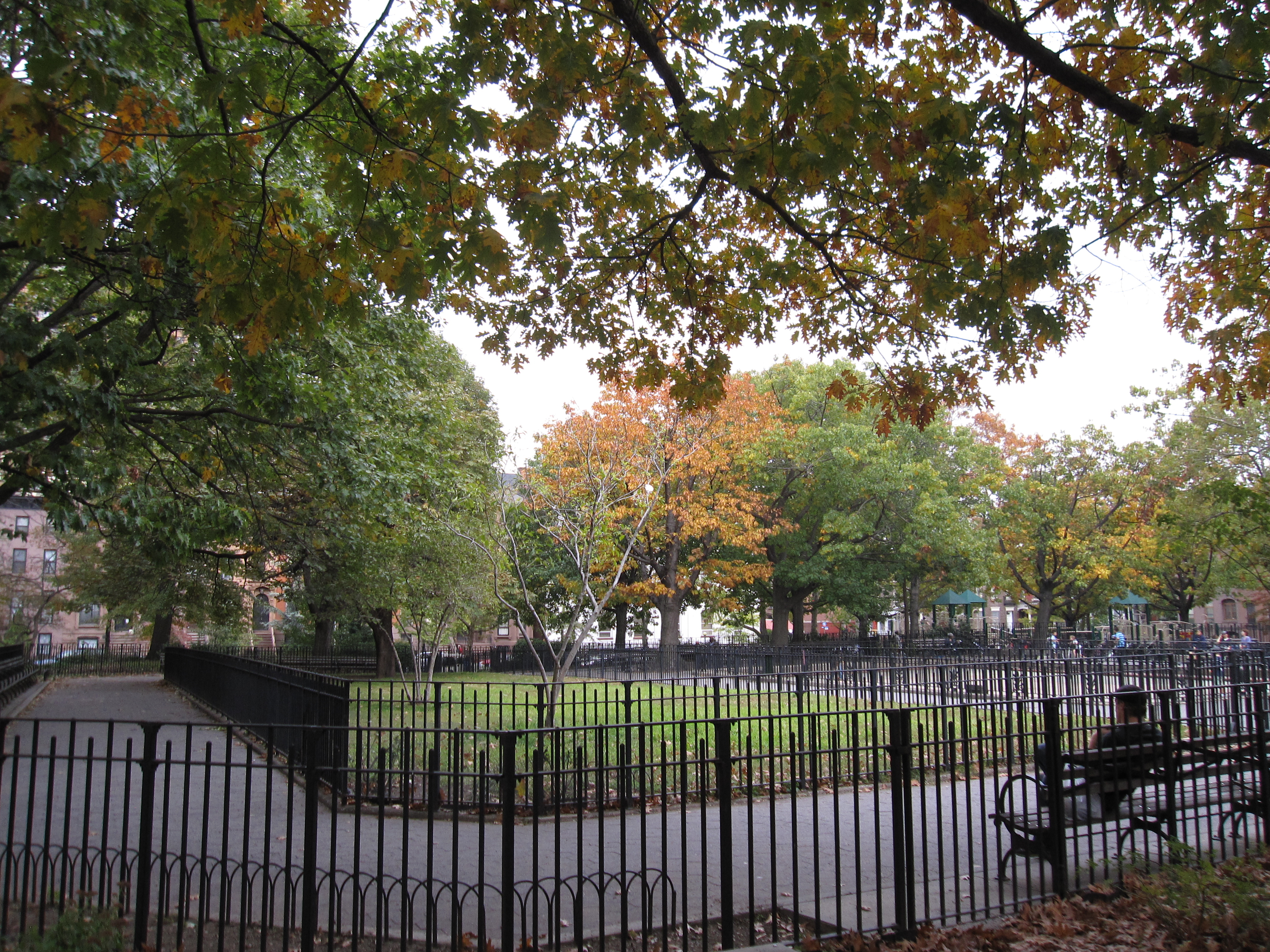
- Underwood Park was the site of the mansion of typewriter manufacturer John Thomas Underwood.
- Interactive map of Clinton Hill
- Coordinates: 40.69°N 73.96°W
- Country: United States
- State: New York
- City: New York City
- Borough: Brooklyn
- Community District: Brooklyn 2
- Established: 1863

Population (2010 United States census)
  - Total: 34,791
- Time zone: UTC−5 (Eastern)
  - Summer (DST): UTC−4 (EDT)
- ZIP Codes: 11205, 11238
- Area codes: 718, 347, 929, and 917

Clinton Hill is a neighborhood located in the north-central portion of the New York City borough of Brooklyn. It is bordered by the Brooklyn Navy Yard and Flushing Avenue to the north, Williamsburg to the northeast, Classon Avenue and Bedford–Stuyvesant to the east, Atlantic Avenue and Prospect Heights to the south and southwest and Vanderbilt Avenue and Fort Greene to the west.

"The Hill", as the general area was known – with a maximum elevation of 95 feet (29 m), the highest in the area – was believed to have health benefits because many people believed that disease was more prevalent in low-lying areas. The area is named after Clinton Avenue, which in turn was named in honor of New York Governor DeWitt Clinton (1769–1828). The main thoroughfare is DeKalb Avenue. The affluent neighborhood's mixture of apartment buildings, mansions, brownstone and brick rowhouses, and the Pratt Institute and St. Joseph's College, built at various times in a number of different styles, is a great part of its charm.

Clinton Hill is part of Brooklyn Community District 2, and its primary ZIP Codes are 11205 and 11238. It is patrolled by the 88th Precinct of the New York City Police Department.

== History ==
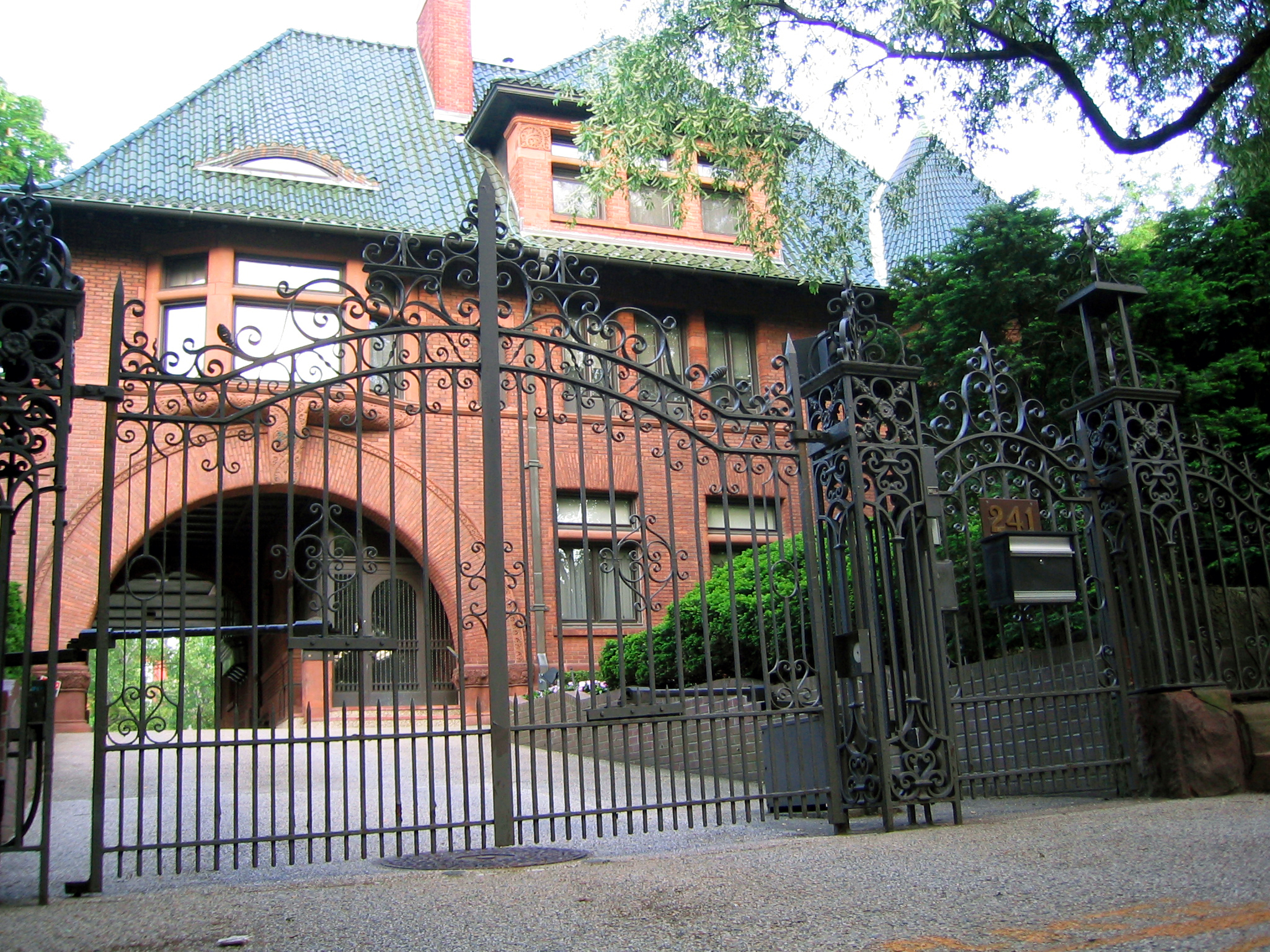
Charles Millard Pratt House, 241 Clinton Avenue

The area's European history began in the 1640s, when Dutch colonists laid tobacco plantations near Wallabout Bay. Bedford Corners, situated just southeast of Clinton Hill, was incorporated in 1663, and the settlers (both Dutch and French Huguenot) purchased surrounding lands from the native Lenape in 1670.

On August 27, 1776, the "Road to Jamaica" (approximately Atlantic Avenue, the southern edge of today's neighborhood) was used by the British army in a surprise overnight march in the American Revolutionary War. The American army was forced to retreat toward Gowanus Creek, and two nights later, to Manhattan. After the war, the Dutch continued to build on the land, which sloped toward the East River and offered great views of the water and of Manhattan.

The tree-lined Clinton Avenue was laid out as a boulevard along the crest of the hill in 1832, and by the 1840s, Clinton Hill and neighboring Fort Greene had become fashionable neighborhoods for the wealthy of Brooklyn, who could commute to Manhattan by way of stagecoach to the Fulton Ferry. The area was originally devised as a rural get-away for those "determined to escape from the closeness of city life", as Walt Whitman, editor of the Brooklyn Daily Eagle, put it in 1846. George Washington Pine had bought up the land in the area and broke it into lots, selling them to those who wanted to lead a quiet life not too far from the conveniences of the Navy Yard. Whitman, a 28-year resident of Brooklyn, had lived in the area for less than a year in 1855, where he completed his masterpiece Leaves of Grass. The 1995 New Yorker article "Walt Whitman’s Ghost" identified his address as 99 Ryerson Street, which still stands.

In the 1860s, after the Civil War, Clinton Hill was developed with row houses, which dominated the street scene by the 1880s. These attracted affluent professionals.

The area's development continued after Charles Pratt, an oil executive, built a mansion at 232 Clinton Avenue, which is now part of the Brooklyn campus of St. Joseph's University. Pratt also built houses there for his sons, which he gave to them as wedding gifts. Other mansions followed, part of the general migration of merchants from Manhattan to Brooklyn, and the area became known as Brooklyn's "Gold Coast". Pratt founded the Pratt Institute in 1887, and its campus remains a focus of the neighborhood.

After the late 1870s, Clinton Hill was one of the stops on the Brooklyn, Flatbush and Coney Island Railway (BF&CI, now part of the BMT Brighton Line), an excursion line which brought families to Brighton Beach for a day of recreation, and allow them to be home "at a reasonable hour". Some families used the BF&CI to relocate to the newly built Brighton Beach Hotel, owned by the same men who led the building of the railroad, for the summer months, and the paterfamilias commuted to New York via ferry to work.

By 1900, apartment buildings were being built on Clinton Avenue, which replaced the mansions there and on Washington Avenue by the 1920s and 40s. In addition some of the remaining mansions were converted into rooming houses in the following decades, and urban renewal, part of Robert Moses' relentless rebuilding of the city, cleared five blocks south of the Pratt Institute, destroying the brownstones there. This was followed in the 1970s by the brownstone revival, in which many of the remaining brownstones were restored. In the 2000s, the neighborhood became somewhat gentrified, with generally wealthier people moving into the area. New construction included an apartment building of passive house design at 283 Greene Avenue.

== Demographics ==
Based on data from the 2020 United States census, the population of Clinton Hill was 28,647, an increase of 19.3% from 24,014 for the same area in 2010.

The racial makeup of the neighborhood was 44.8% White, 26.4% Black, 9.5% Asian, 5.7% from two or more races, and 1.5% from other races. Hispanic or Latino of any race were 12.1% of the population.

Residents include many "artists, architects, photographers, and craftspeople". In the 21st century, the neighborhood has experienced a notable increase in population, with increased gentrification and a growing upper-middle-class population.

As according to the 2020 census data from New York City Department of City Planning, there were between 10,000 and 19,999 White residents and 5,000 to 9,999 Black residents, meanwhile each the Hispanic and Asian populations were each less than 5,000 residents.

== Landmarks ==
The Clinton Hill Historic District was listed on the National Register of Historic Places in 1985. The district includes the mansions of Clinton Avenue, built in the 1870s and 1880s. The most prominent of these are linked to Charles Pratt, who built a mansion for himself at 232 Clinton Avenue in 1874, the year his Charles Pratt & Company was acquired by Standard Oil, and one each as wedding presents for three of his four sons. These four mansions can be seen on Clinton Avenue between DeKalb and Willoughby. The rest of the historic district is noted for its prominent Italianate and Beaux-Arts rowhouses. The Clinton Hill South Historic District was listed in 1986. James William Elwell built the wood-framed Italianate villa at 70 Lefferts Place that is in the Clinton Hill district. The house is one of the two oldest houses on Lefferts Place and became designated a landmark by the Landmarks Preservation Commission on December 12, 2006.

St. Mary's Episcopal Church at 220 Classon Avenue in Clinton Hill, built c. 1859, and the Mechanics Temple, which was built at 67 Putnam Avenue as the Lincoln Club in 1889, are both part of the historic district. Other buildings in the Historic District include a Gothic Revival wooden house at 284 Clinton Avenue, built c.1854; an Italianate brick and stone villa dating from c. 1850 at 447 Clinton Avenue, intact runs of mid-19th century rowhouses on Grand Avenue, St. James Place and Cambridge Place as well as on DeKalb Avenue and Waverly Avenue; mansions from the "Gold Coast" era in the 200 to 400 blocks of Clinton Avenue; (Note: At 229, 232, 241, 245, 278, 284, 300, 315, 321, 356, 380, 384, 404 & 406, 405, 410, 415, 443, 447, 457, 463 and 487 Clinton Avenue) and at 367 Washington Avenue; and apartment houses on Clinton Avenue.

On Lafayette Avenue are both the Emmanuel Baptist Church, completed in 1887, and the Joseph Steele or Steele-Skinner House of 1812. Clinton Avenue contains the Church of St. Luke and St. Matthew, completed in 1891, and the Royal Castle Apartments, completed in 1912. All are individually landmarked.

Many of Pratt Institute's buildings are landmarked, or of architectural interest, and St. Joseph's College utilizes several of the former Pratt family mansions on Clinton Avenue.

The brick building at 275 Park Avenue was built in the 1890s as a chocolate factory which produced and distributed Tootsie Rolls throughout the United States. In 2002, the building was converted into loft apartments.

== Education ==
=== Institutions ===
Pratt Institute, founded by Charles Pratt in 1887, is in Clinton Hill. Pratt began as an engineering school, designed to train immigrants in then-novel sciences. Today the school has programs in architecture, graphic design, interior design, and industrial design.

The Brooklyn campus of St. Joseph's College is in Clinton Hill.

By 2021 the interim location of the German School of Brooklyn (GSB) was the former Coop School in the Bedford Stuyvesant and Clinton Hill area. In 2021 the school moved all levels to its permanent site at 9 Hanover Place in Downtown Brooklyn.

=== Library ===
The Brooklyn Public Library (BPL)'s Clinton Hill branch is located at 380 Washington Avenue near Lafayette Avenue. It opened in 1973.

== Transportation ==
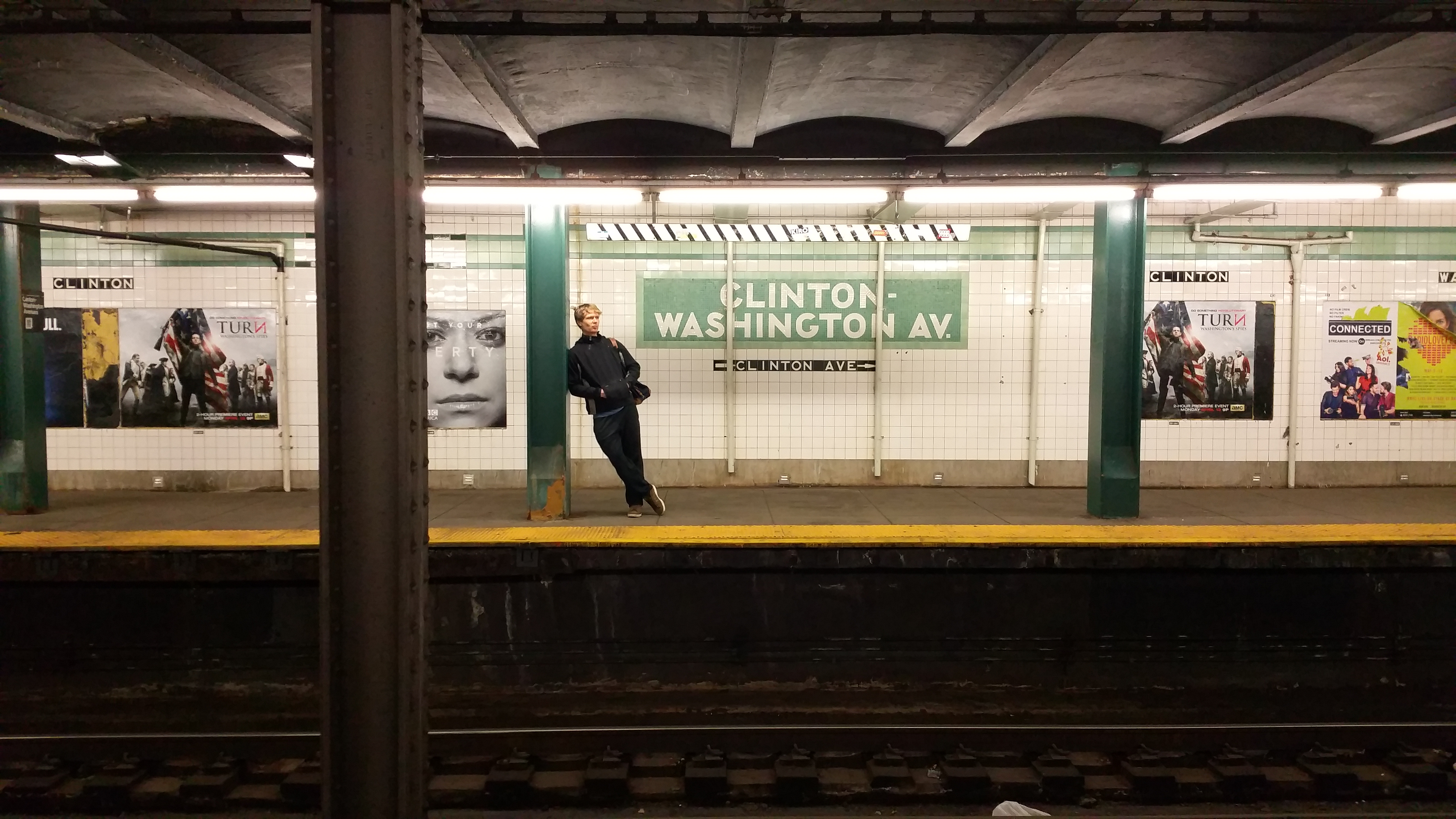
The Clinton–Washington Avenues station on the IND Crosstown Line

Clinton Hill is served by the New York City Subway's IND Fulton Street Line (A and C trains), with a stop at Clinton–Washington Avenues station, as well as the IND Crosstown Line (G train), with stops at Classon Avenue and Clinton–Washington Avenues. Several New York City Transit local bus routes provide service to the neighborhood, including the B25, B26, B38, B45, B48, B52, B54, B57, B62, B69. Starting in the 1880s, the Myrtle Avenue and Lexington Avenue elevated lines served the area. The Lexington Avenue line followed Grand Avenue south from Myrtle. The last train on the Lexington Avenue line ran on October 13, 1950; dismantling of the elevated tracks began on November 1.

Clinton Hill is served by NYC Ferry's Astoria route, which stops at the Brooklyn Navy Yard. The Brooklyn Navy Yard stop opened on May 20, 2019.

== Notable residents ==
Notable residents over the years have included:

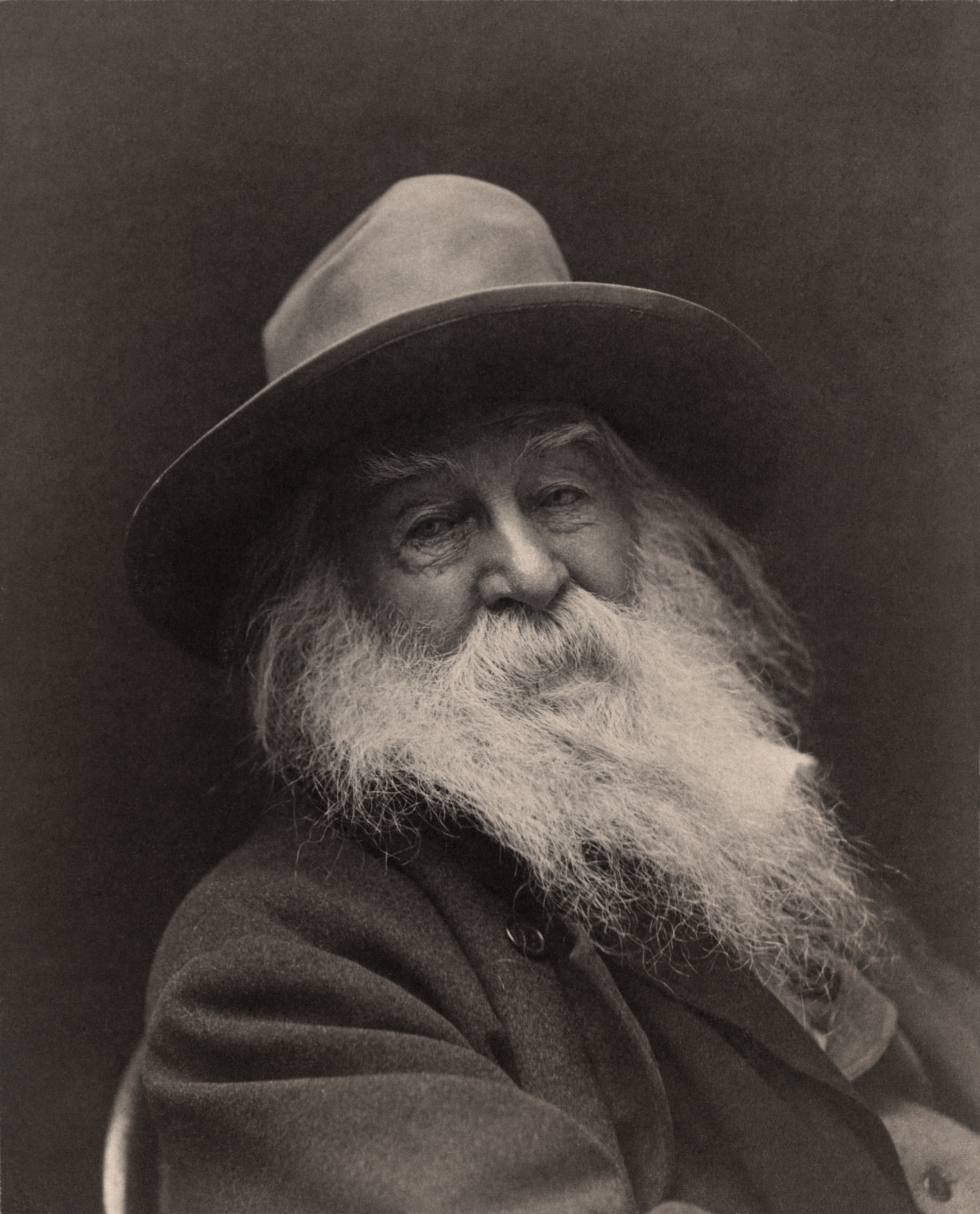
Walt Whitman

- Asa Akira (born 1985), pornographic actress and adult film director
- Ted Allen (born 1965), writer and television personality
- Lester Bowie (1941–1999), avant-garde jazz (trumpet) musician owned Victorian-style home at 207 Washington Avenue for 20 years until his death in 1999
- Jay Critch (born 1997), rapper
- Jennifer Egan (born 1962), novelist and short-story writer
- Carmen Ejogo (born 1973), actress and singer
- Charles F. Erhart (1821–1891), businessman who co-founded Chas. Pfizer & Co., Inc.
- James William Elwell (1820–1899), shipping merchant and philanthropist who founded James W. Elwell & Co., and built the historic house at 70 Lefferts Place.
- KOTA the Friend (born 1992), hip hop artist and producer who mentions Clinton Hill in some of his songs
- Adrian Grenier (born 1976), actor
- Lev Grossman (born 1969), novelist and journalist
- Heems (stage name of Himanshu Suri), rapper
- Tehching Hsieh (born 1950), performance artist
- Letitia James (born 1958), incumbent Attorney General of New York
- Talib Kweli (born 1975), rapper
- Mos Def (born 1973), rapper/actor
- The Notorious B.I.G. (1972–1997), rapper, grew up on 226 St. James Place, near the Bedford–Stuyvesant border; the address was then regarded as part of Bedford–Stuyvesant
- David Paterson (born 1954), former New York Governor
- Rosie Perez (born 1964), actress
- Mary Pinkett (c. 1931–2003), first black New York City councilwoman, she served 28 years from 1974 until 2001 when she was term-limited out of office
- Antoni Porowski (born 1984), chef, actor, and television personality, lived in a studio with former partner, Joey Krietemeyer, that has been featured in interior design magazines
- Susan Sarandon (born 1946), actress, lives in a home described as "aesthetically ironic"
- Danny Simmons, artist
- Patti Smith and Robert Mapplethorpe shared an apartment on Hall Street in 1967, after they first met
- Barbara Stanwyck (1907–1990), actress, model and dancer, was born at 246 Classon Avenue
- Jason Sudeikis (born 1975), actor and comedian
- Conrad Tillard (born 1964), politician, Baptist minister, radio host, author, and civil rights activist
- John Thomas Underwood (1857–1937), entrepreneur and inventor who founded the Underwood Typewriter Company
- Walt Whitman (1819–1892), poet and editor of the Brooklyn Daily Eagle from 1846 to 1848, who lived at 99 Ryerson Street while working on Leaves of Grass
- Olivia Wilde (born 1984), actress. Lived in Clinton Hill from 2014 to 2019.
- Jessica Williams (born 1989), actress and comedian
- Jeffrey Wright (born 1965), actor
- Bowen Yang (born 1990), comedian on Saturday Night Live
- Malik Yoba (born 1967), actor

== Gallery ==
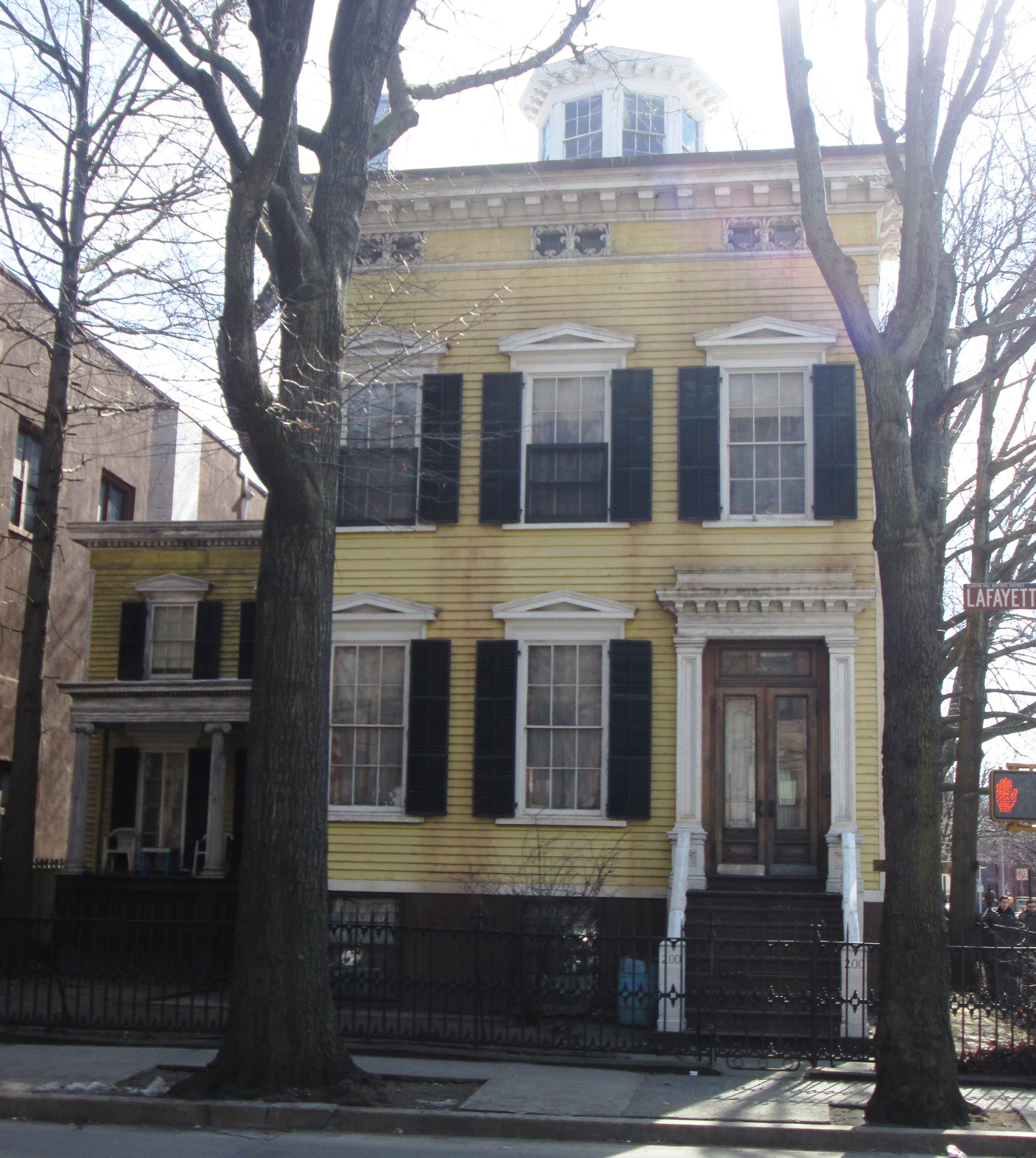
200 Lafayette Avenue, Joseph Steel or Steele-Skinner House
(1812)

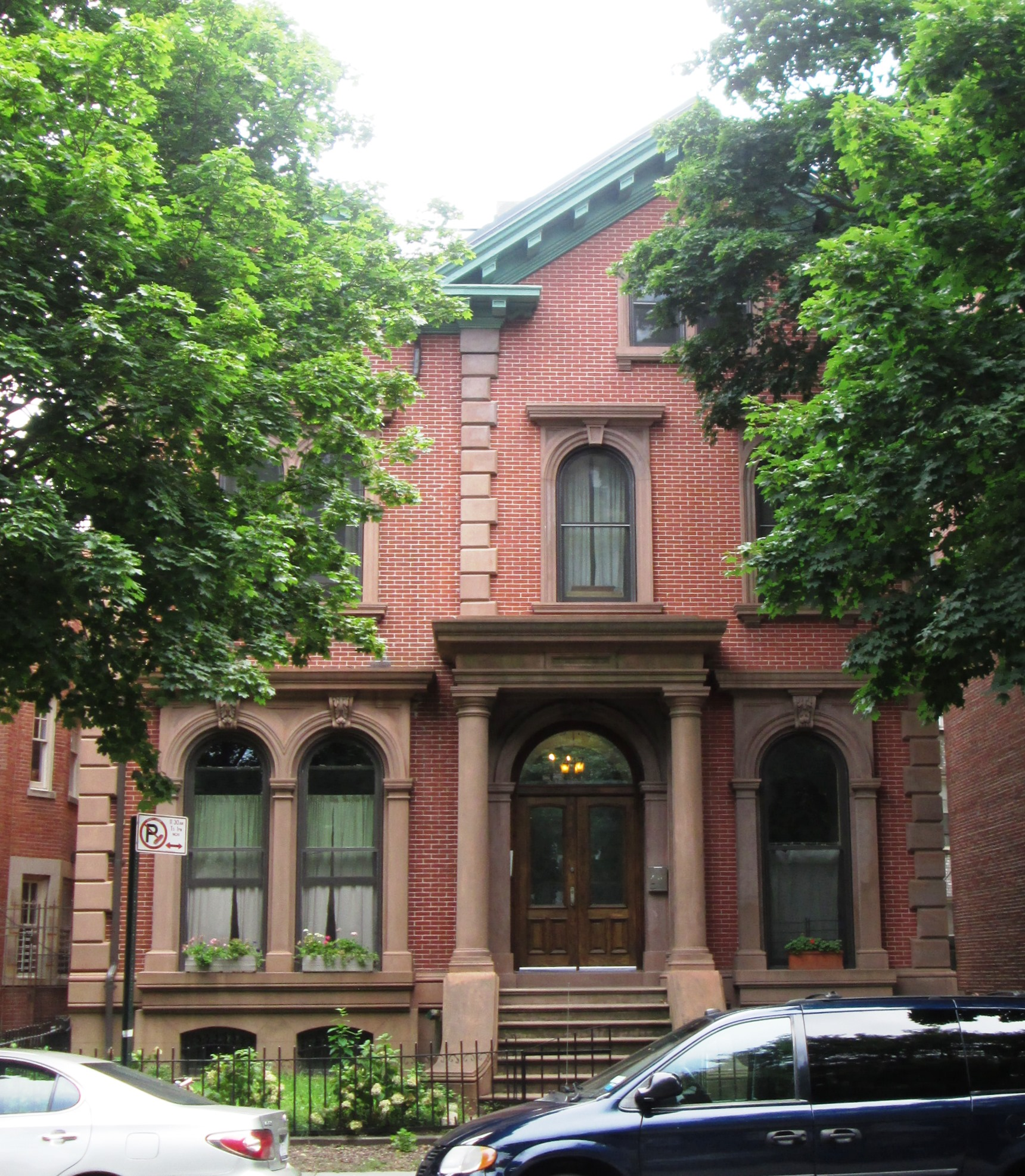
447 Clinton Avenue, originally the David Burdette House, later the Galilee Baptist Church
(c. 1850)

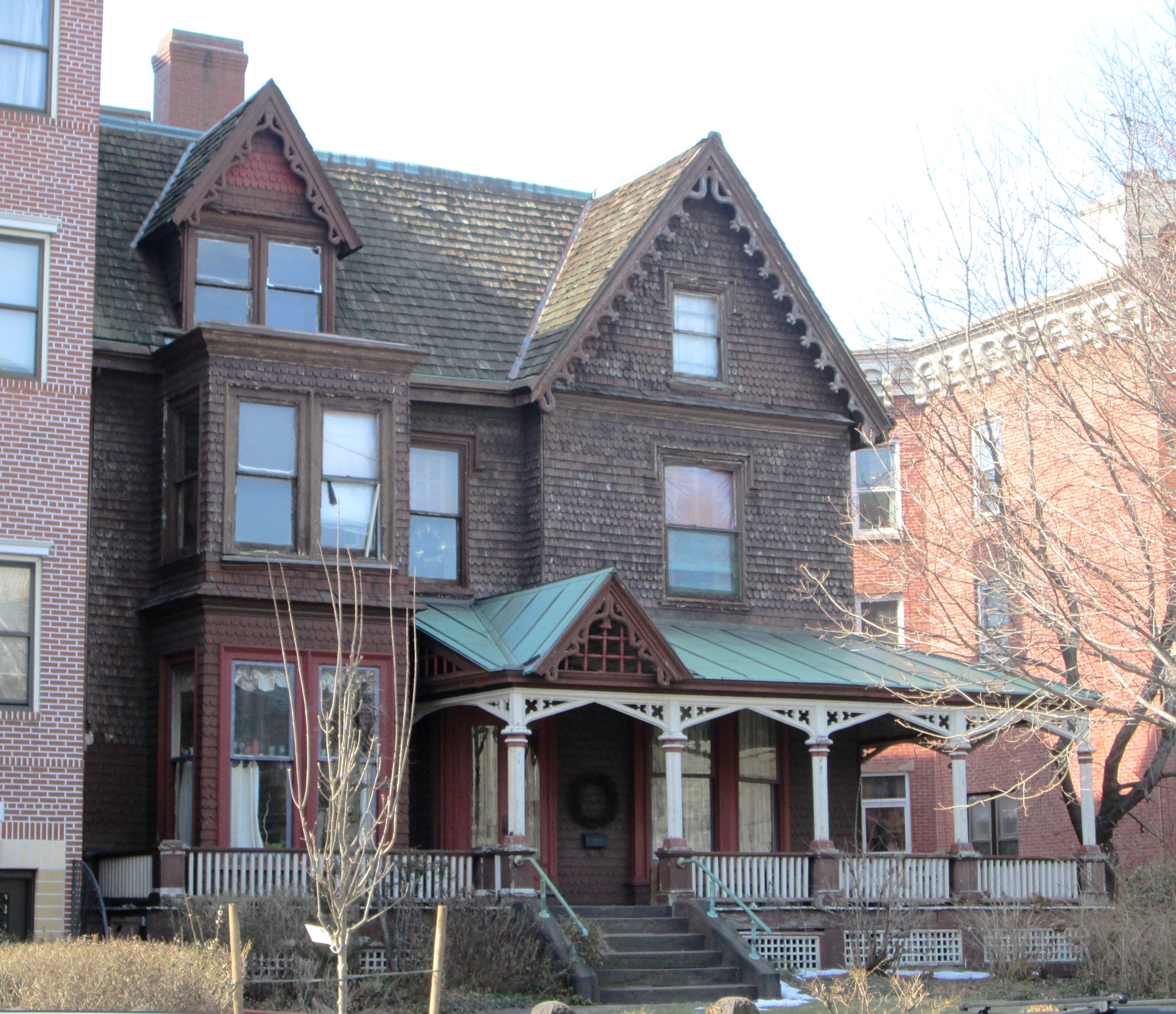
William W. Crane House, 284 Clinton Avenue
(Field & Correja, c. 1854)

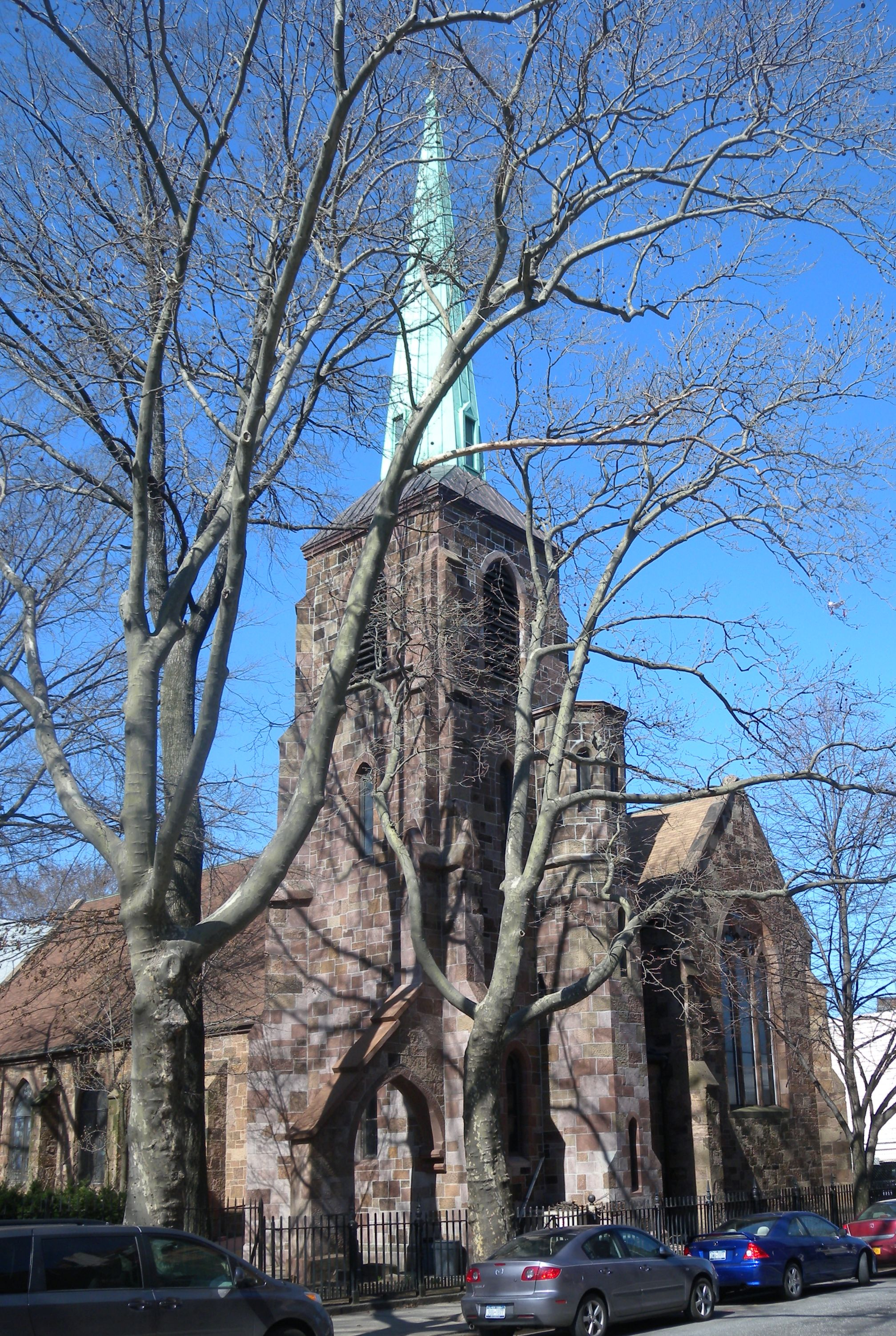
St. Mary's Episcopal Church
(Richard T. Auchmuty, c. 1859)

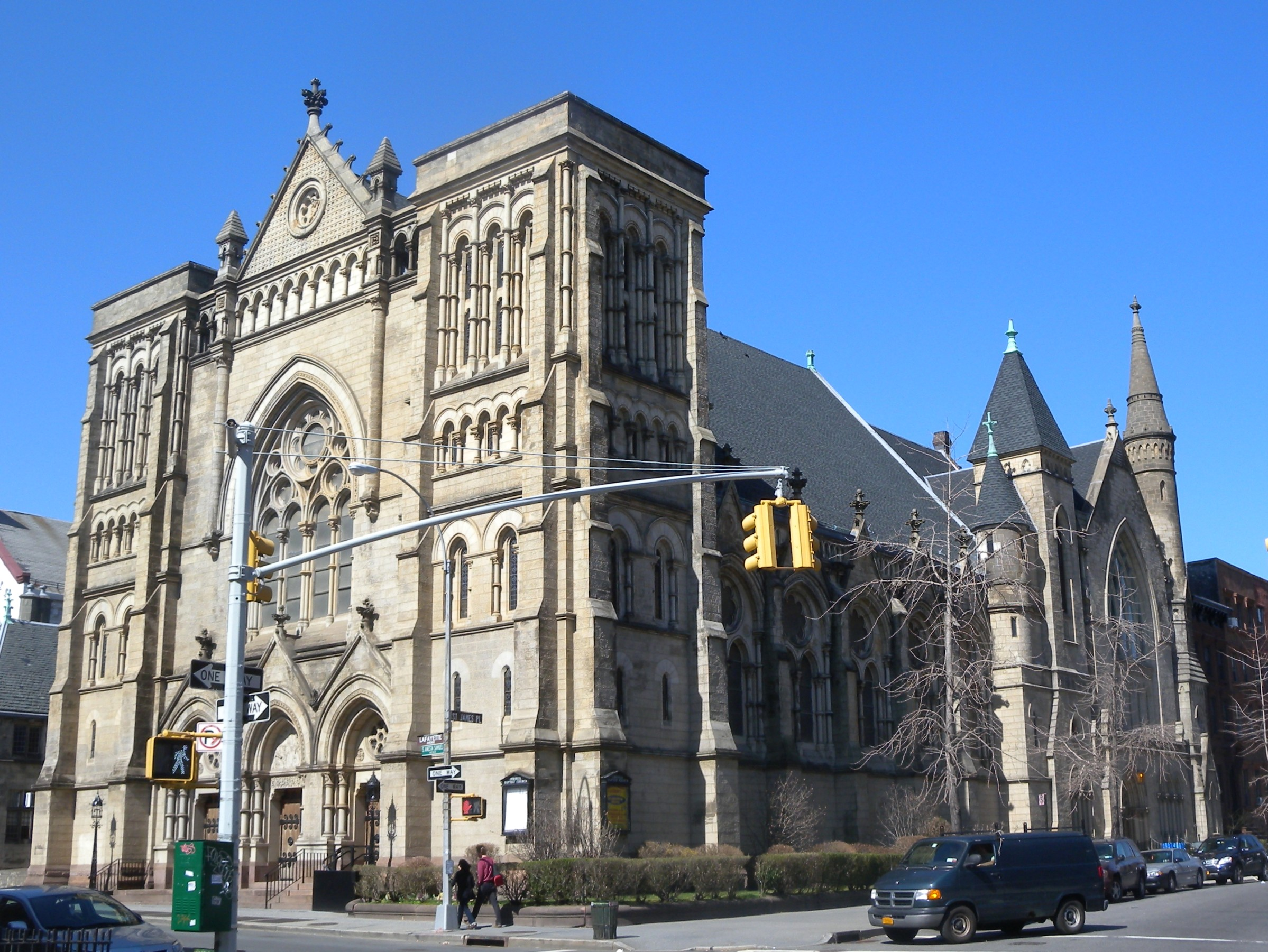
Emmanuel Baptist Church
(1887)

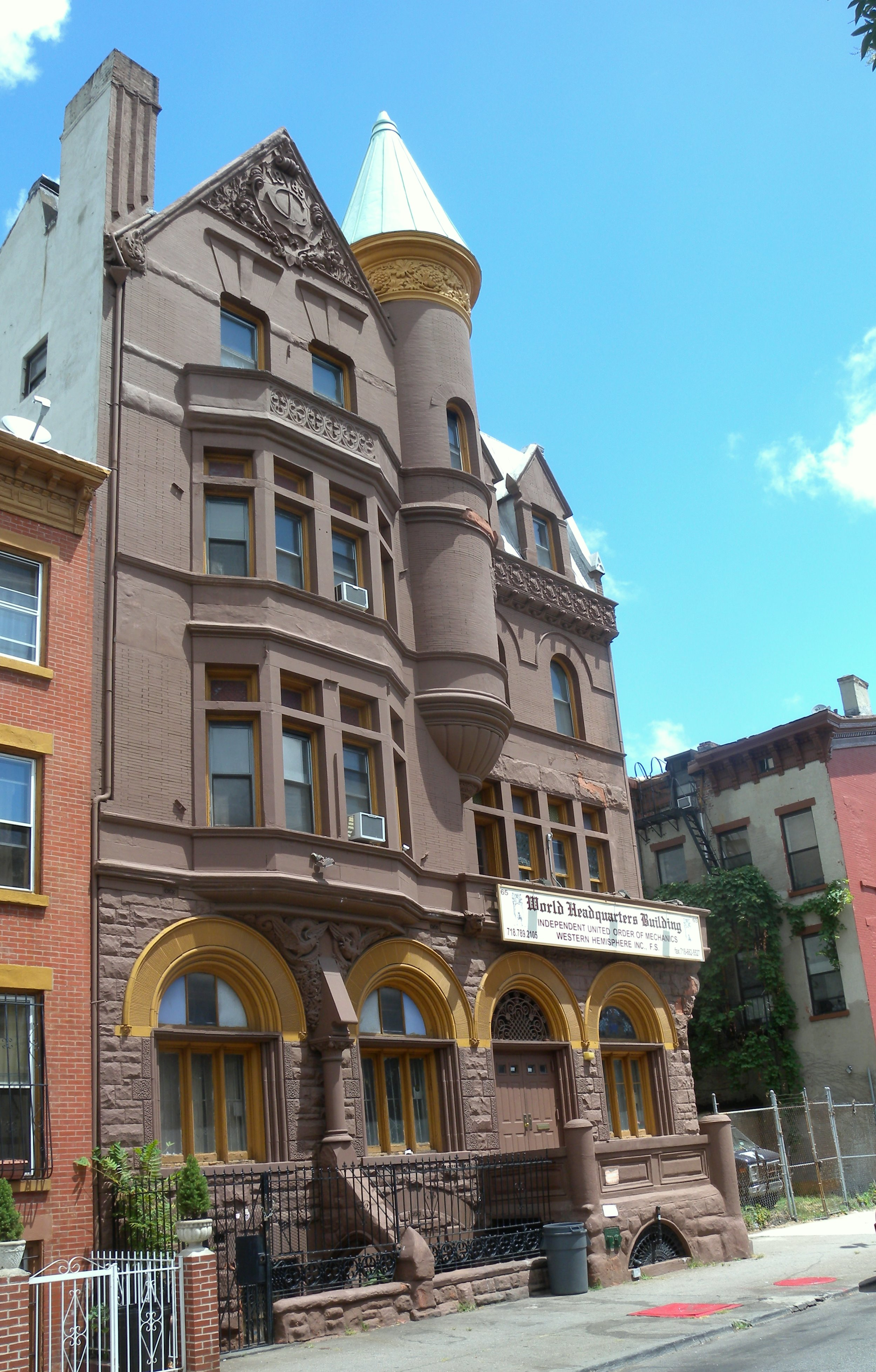
Mechanics Temple, originally the Lincoln Club, at 67 Putnam Avenue
(Rudolph L. Daus, 1889)

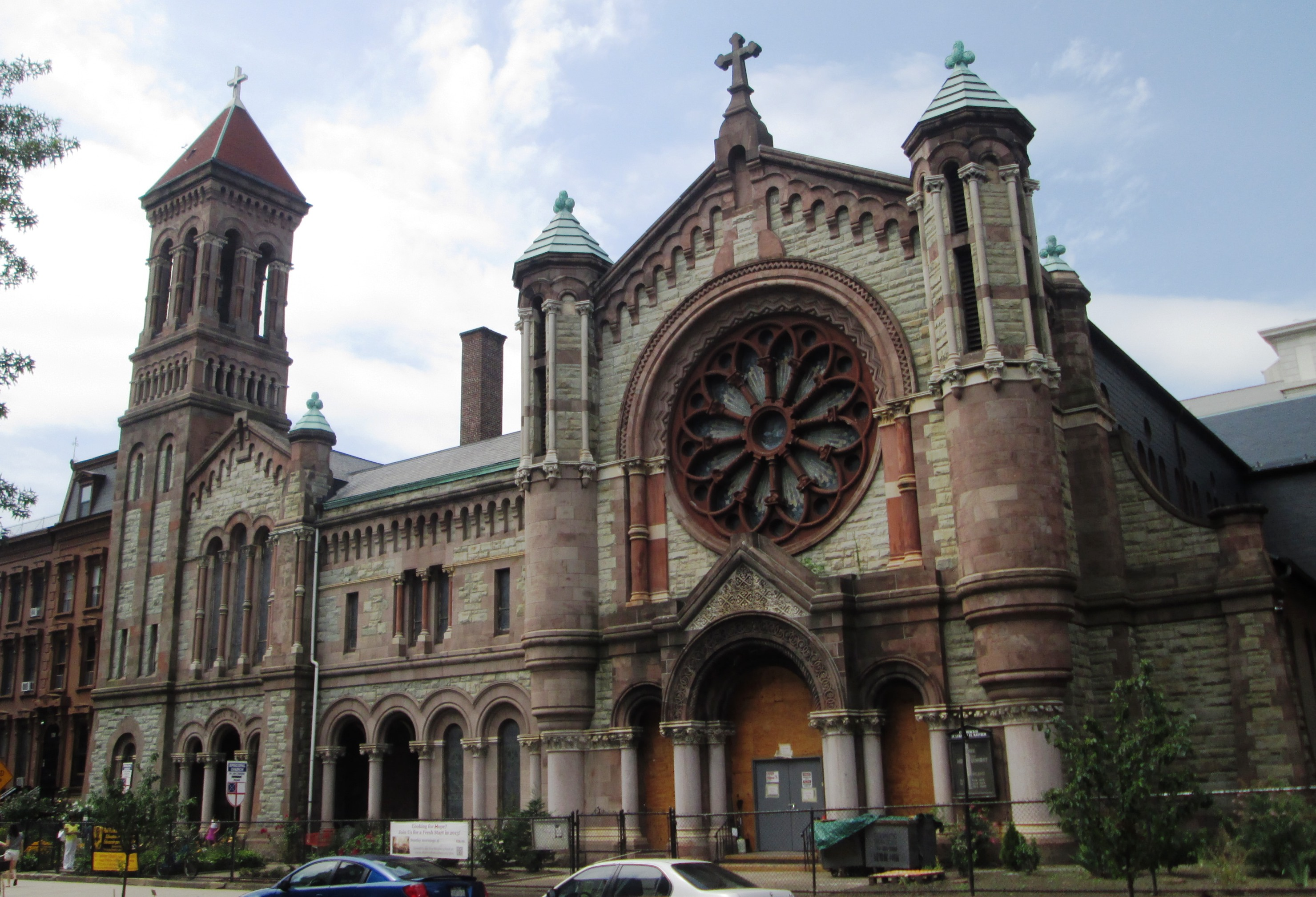
Church of St. Luke and St. Matthew
(John Welch, 1891)

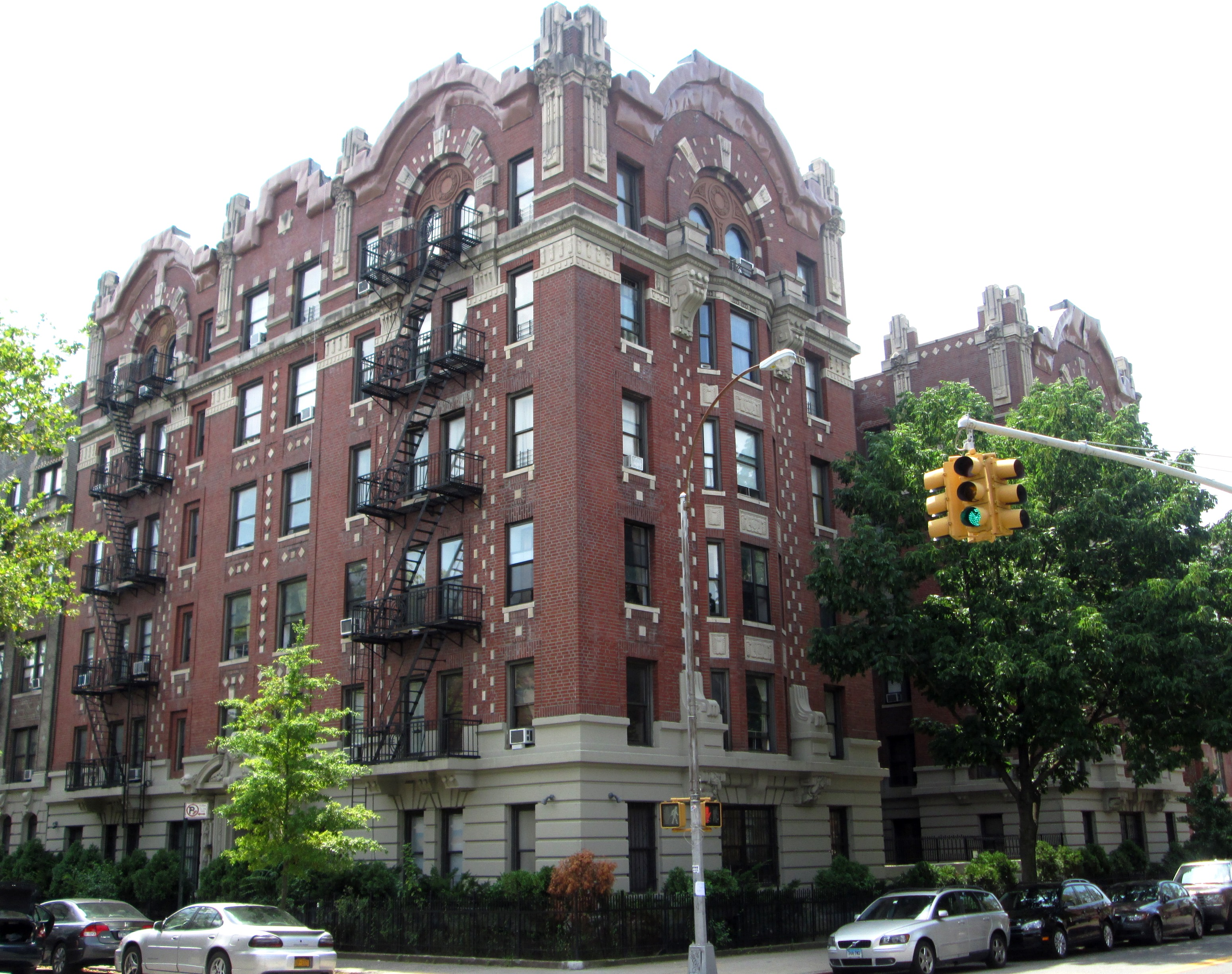
Royal Castle Apartments, 20 Gates Avenue
(Wortmann & Braun, 1912)
