= USS Henlopen =

Minesweeper of the United States Navy

History

United States
- Name: USS Henlopen
- Namesake: Previous name retained
- Owner: James W. Elwell & Co.
- Builder: W. G. Abbott, Milford, Delaware
- Completed: 1912
- Acquired: 12 December 1917
- Commissioned: 26 January 1918
- Fate: Transferred to France 27 March 1918
- Notes: Operated as commercial fishing boat Henlopen 1912-1917; served as French Navy minesweeper and tug from 1918

General characteristics
- Type: Minesweeper and tug
- Displacement: 254 tons
- Length: 150 ft (46 m)
- Beam: 24 ft (7.3 m)
- Draft: 9 ft (2.7 m)
- Speed: 12 knots
- Armament: 1 × 3-inch (76.2-millimeter) gun

USS Henlopen (SP-385) was a minesweeper and tug that served in the United States Navy from January to March 1918.

Henlopen was built as a commercial fishing boat of the same name in 1912 by W. G. Abbott at Milford, Delaware. On 12 December 1917, the U.S. Navy acquired her at New York City from her owner, James W. Elwell & Co., of New York City, for use on the section patrol as a minesweeper and tug during World War I. She was commissioned as USS Henlopen (SP-385) on 26 January 1918.

After two months of service, Henlopen was transferred to France at New York City on 27 March 1918 for French Navy use as a minesweeper and tug.
