= Downtown Clinton Historic District =

Historic district in Massachusetts, United States

- U.S. National Register of Historic Places
- U.S. Historic district
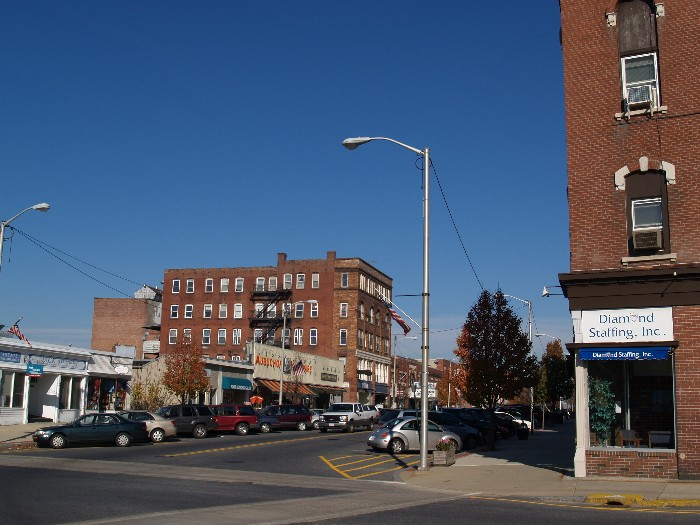
- corner of High & Union Streets

- Location within Massachusetts Location within the United States
- Location: Clinton, Massachusetts
- Coordinates: 42°25′2″N 71°40′59″W
- Built: 1850
- Architect: Hoadley, John C.; et al.
- Architectural style: Late 19th And 20th Century Revivals, Late Victorian
- NRHP reference No.: 85000319
- Added to NRHP: February 21, 1985

The Downtown Clinton Historic District is a historic district encompassing the main downtown area of Clinton, Massachusetts. It extends along High Street, between Union Street in the south, and Ring and Prospect Streets in the north, and includes several adjacent buildings on Church Street, a major cross street. The area was developed between roughly 1840 and the 1920s, and its architecture is reflective of this period. The oldest buildings are Italianate in style, while those built later are predominantly Colonial Revival in character. The district includes 31 contributing buildings. One of the oldest buildings in the district is the Brimhall Building at 92-116 High Street, which was built in 1857, but received a Colonial Revival facelift in 1915.

The district was listed on the National Register of Historic Places in 1985.

== See also ==
- National Register of Historic Places listings in Worcester County, Massachusetts
