= Clinton Hill South Historic District =

Historic district in Brooklyn, New York

- U.S. National Register of Historic Places
- U.S. Historic district
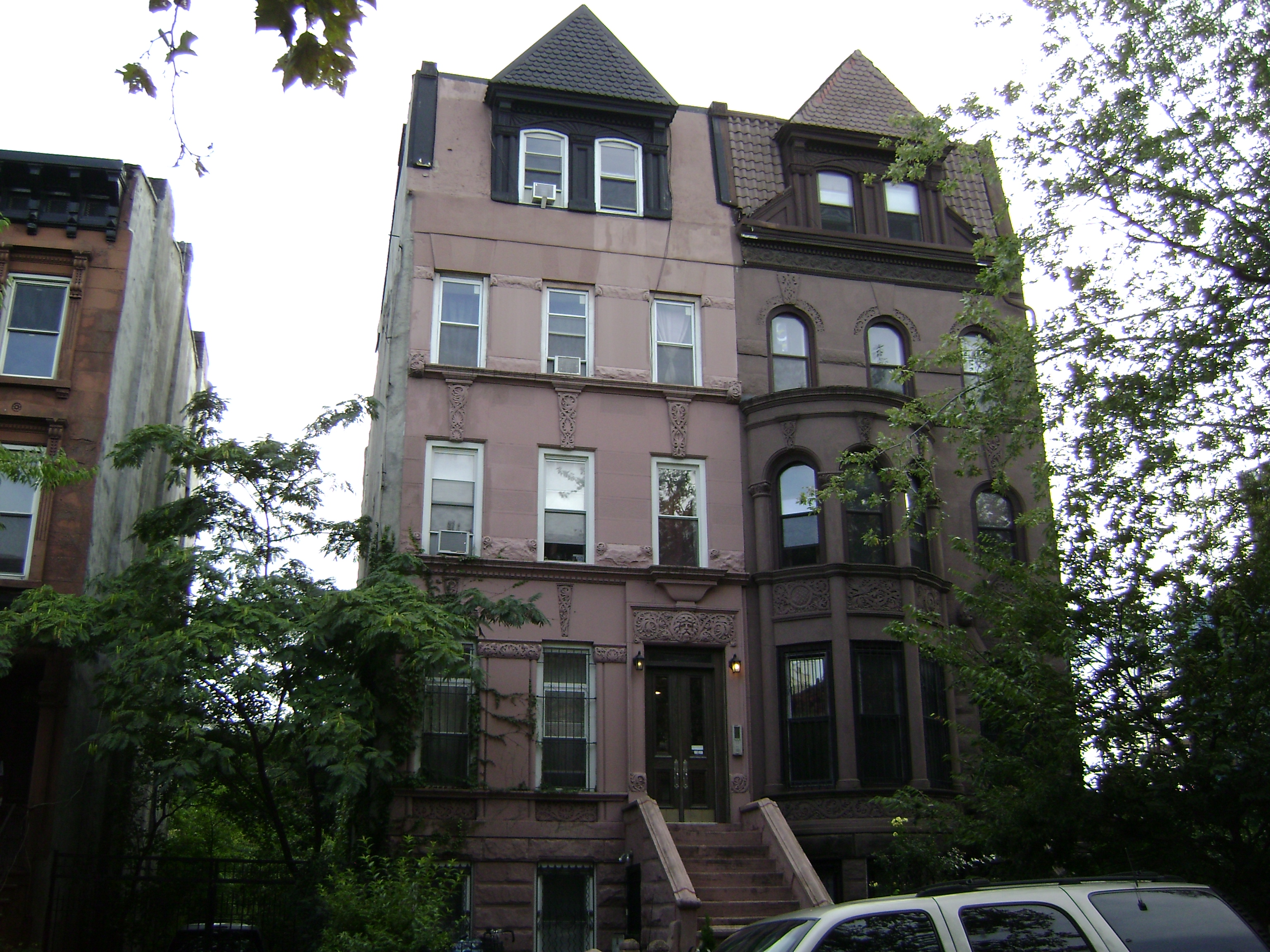
- Row houses in the district

- Location within New York City Location within New York Location within the United States
- Location: Roughly Lefferts and Brevoort Places between Washington Avenue and Bedford Place, Brooklyn, New York
- Coordinates: 40°40′50″N 73°57′32″W
- Area: 23 acres (9.3 ha)
- Architect: Robert Dixon, et al.
- Architectural style: Colonial Revival, Late Victorian, Neo-Grec
- NRHP reference No.: 86001675
- Added to NRHP: July 17, 1986

Clinton Hill South Historic District is a national historic district in Clinton Hill, Brooklyn, in New York City. It consists of 246 largely residential contributing buildings built between the 1850s and 1922. It includes fine examples of Neo-Grec style row houses. Also in the district are a number of early 20th century apartment buildings in the Colonial Revival style.

It was listed on the National Register of Historic Places in 1986.

== Notable residents ==
- Thomas F. Woodlock, 155-157 Lefferts Place, editor of The Wall Street Journal and Interstate Commerce Commission commissioner.
- James William Elwell, 70 Lefferts Place, shipping merchant and philanthropist; members of the New York Chamber of Commerce.

== See also ==
- Clinton Hill Historic District
