= Forked River, New Jersey =

Place in Ocean County, New Jersey, United States

- Census-designated place
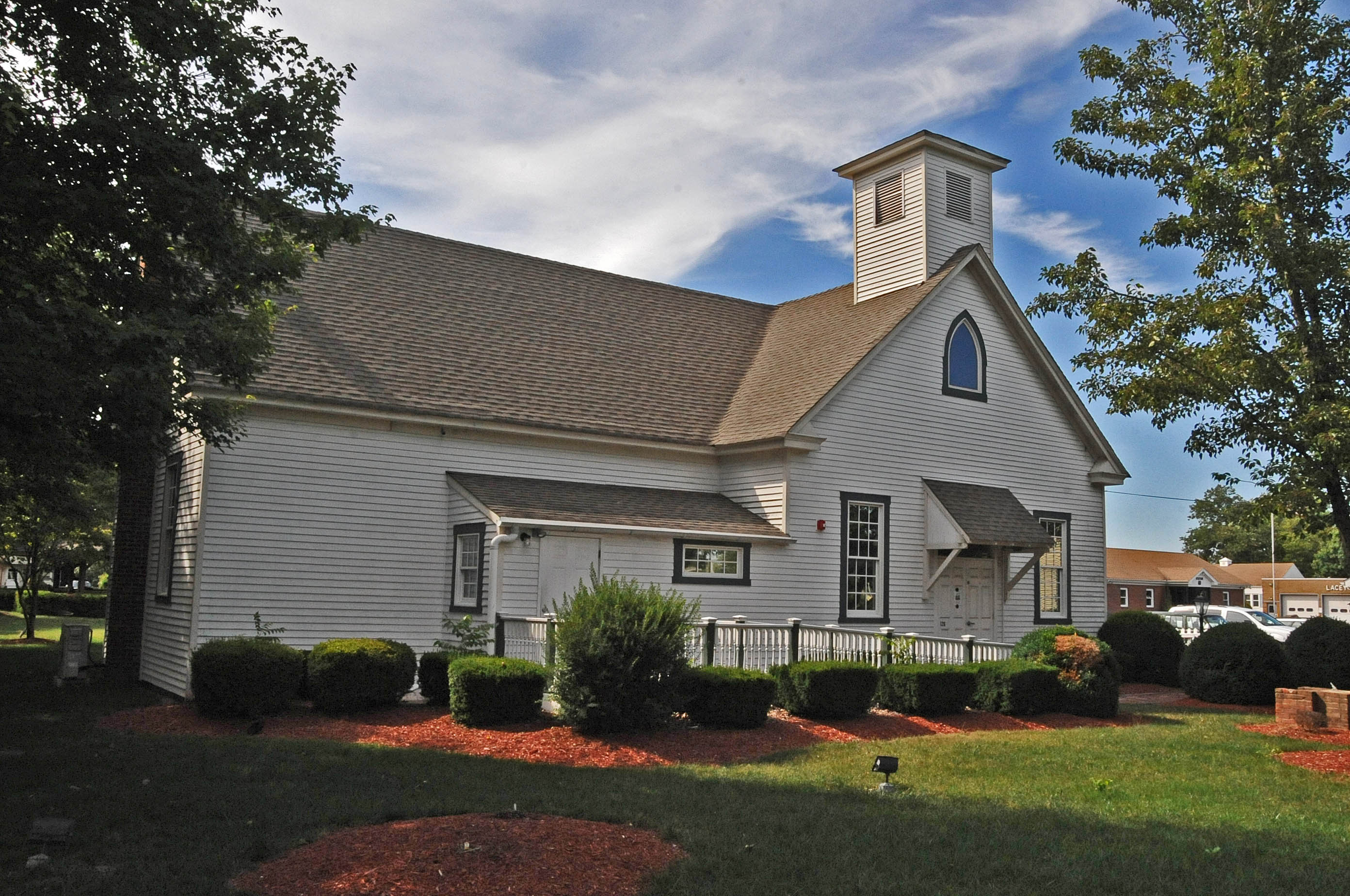
- Lacey Schoolhouse Museum

- Map of Forked River CDP in Ocean County. Inset: Location of Ocean County in New Jersey.

- Location in Ocean County Location in New Jersey Location in the United States
- Coordinates: 39.8398413°N 74.1901399°W
- Country: United States
- State: New Jersey
- County: Ocean
- Township: Lacey

Area
  - Total: 3.47 sq mi (8.99 km^{2})
  - Land: 2.73 sq mi (7.08 km^{2})
  - Water: 0.74 sq mi (1.91 km^{2}) 73.66%
- Elevation: 13 ft (4 m)

Population (2020)
  - Total: 5,274
  - Density: 1,928.3/sq mi (744.5/km^{2})
- Time zone: UTC−05:00 (Eastern (EST))
  - Summer (DST): UTC−04:00 (Eastern (EDT))
- ZIP Code: 08731
- Area code: 609
- FIPS code: 34-76107
- GNIS feature ID: 02390441

Forked River (/ˈfɔːrkɪd/) is an unincorporated community and census-designated place (CDP) located within Lacey Township, in Ocean County, in the U.S. state of New Jersey. As of the 2020 United States census, the CDP's population was 5,274, an increase of 30 (+0.6%) from the 5,244 enumerated at the 2010 census, which in turn reflected an increase of 330 (+6.7%) from the 4.914 counted in the 2000 census.

Many Ocean County residents commonly refer to all of Lacey Township as Forked River. The first word is pronounced by locals with two syllables (/ˈfɔːrkɪd/). Pronouncing the first word with one syllable (/fɔːrkt/) is considered a sign of a new resident or outsider (an example of a shibboleth).

== Geography ==
According to the U.S. Census Bureau, the CDP had a total area of 10.336 square miles (26.77 km^{2}), including 2.723 square miles (7.05 km^{2}) of land and 7.613 square miles (19.72 km^{2}) of water (73.66%).

Forked River is located on U.S. Route 9 south of Toms River. The community of Lanoka Harbor is directly north of Forked River, Bamber Lake is to the west, Barnegat is to the southwest, and Waretown is to the south.

Forked River is also the name of a nearby river that empties into Barnegat Bay.

== Demographics ==
Historical population
Census	Pop.	Note	%±
1970	1,422		—
1990	4,243		—
2000	4,914		15.8%
2010	5,244		6.7%
2020	5,274		0.6%
Sources: 1950 1960 1970; 1980 1990 2000; 2010 2020

Forked River first appeared as an unincorporated community in the 1970 U.S. census It did not appear in the 1980 U.S. census. The community was listed as a census designated place in the 1990 United States census.

=== Racial and ethnic composition ===
Forked River CDP, New Jersey – Racial and ethnic composition Note: the US Census treats Hispanic/Latino as an ethnic category. This table excludes Latinos from the racial categories and assigns them to a separate category. Hispanics/Latinos may be of any race.
Race / Ethnicity (NH = Non-Hispanic)	Pop 2000	Pop 2010	Pop 2020	% 2000	% 2010	% 2020
White alone (NH)	4,668	4,781	4,547	94.99%	91.17%	86.22%
Black or African American alone (NH)	36	31	34	0.73%	0.59%	0.64%
Native American or Alaska Native alone (NH)	10	7	8	0.20%	0.13%	0.15%
Asian alone (NH)	16	32	39	0.33%	0.61%	0.74%
Native Hawaiian or Pacific Islander alone (NH)	0	5	1	0.00%	0.10%	0.02%
Other race alone (NH)	0	0	21	0.00%	0.00%	0.40%
Mixed race or Multiracial (NH)	18	40	159	0.37%	0.76%	3.01%
Hispanic or Latino (any race)	166	348	465	3.38%	6.64%	8.82%
Total	4,914	5,244	5,274	100.00%	100.00%	100.00%

=== 2020 census ===
As of the 2020 census, Forked River had a population of 5,274. The median age was 43.4 years. 19.8% of residents were under the age of 18 and 18.6% of residents were 65 years of age or older. For every 100 females there were 101.1 males, and for every 100 females age 18 and over there were 99.4 males age 18 and over.

96.6% of residents lived in urban areas, while 3.4% lived in rural areas.

There were 2,097 households in Forked River, of which 26.4% had children under the age of 18 living in them. Of all households, 53.2% were married-couple households, 18.8% were households with a male householder and no spouse or partner present, and 19.8% were households with a female householder and no spouse or partner present. About 24.8% of all households were made up of individuals and 10.7% had someone living alone who was 65 years of age or older.

There were 2,640 housing units, of which 20.6% were vacant. The homeowner vacancy rate was 3.0% and the rental vacancy rate was 6.2%.

=== 2010 census ===
The 2010 United States census counted 5,244 people, 2,077 households, and 1,429 families in the CDP. The population density was 1,926.1 people per square mile (743.7 people/km^{2}). There were 2,610 housing units at an average density of 958.6 units per square mile (370.1 units/km^{2}). The racial makeup was 95.58% (5,012) White, 0.74% (39) Black or African American, 0.23% (12) Native American, 0.61% (32) Asian, 0.10% (5) Pacific Islander, 1.66% (87) from other races, and 1.09% (57) from two or more races. Hispanic or Latino of any race were 6.64% (348) of the population.

Of the 2,077 households, 25.7% had children under the age of 18; 55.7% were married couples living together; 8.8% had a female householder with no husband present and 31.2% were non-families. Of all households, 24.2% were made up of individuals and 9.4% had someone living alone who was 65 years of age or older. The average household size was 2.51 and the average family size was 3.00.

20.6% of the population were under the age of 18, 8.0% from 18 to 24, 24.7% from 25 to 44, 31.0% from 45 to 64, and 15.6% who were 65 years of age or older. The median age was 42.8 years. For every 100 females, the population had 102.2 males. For every 100 females ages 18 and older there were 100.0 males.

=== 2000 census ===
As of the 2000 United States census there were 4,914 people, 1,927 households, and 1,383 families residing in the CDP. The population density was 656.5 people/km^{2} (1,700 people/mi^{2}). There were 2,468 housing units at an average density of 329.7 units/km^{2} (854 units/mi^{2}). The racial makeup of the CDP was 97.37% White, 0.73% African American, 0.22% Native American, 0.33% Asian, 0.83% from other races, and 0.51% from two or more races. Hispanic or Latino of any race were 3.38% of the population.

There were 1,927 households, out of which 30.2% had children under the age of 18 living with them, 58.8% were married couples living together, 9.3% had a female householder with no husband present, and 28.2% were non-families. 22.6% of all households were made up of individuals, and 9.3% had someone living alone who was 65 years of age or older. The average household size was 2.54 and the average family size was 2.98.

In the CDP the population was spread out, with 24.0% under the age of 18, 6.2% from 18 to 24, 29.2% from 25 to 44, 25.3% from 45 to 64, and 15.4% who were 65 years of age or older. The median age was 39 years. For every 100 females, there were 97.5 males. For every 100 females age 18 and over, there were 94.2 males.

The median income for a household in the CDP was $55,433, and the median income for a family was $59,830. Males had a median income of $46,179 versus $30,987 for females. The per capita income for the CDP was $25,696. About 6.3% of families and 7.6% of the population were below the poverty line, including 14.9% of those under age 18 and 6.1% of those age 65 or over.

== Education ==
Lacey Township School District is the local school district.

St. Mary Academy near Manahawkin CDP, a K-8 school of the Roman Catholic Diocese of Trenton, is in the area. From 1997, until 2019 it operated as All Saints Regional Catholic School and was collectively managed by five churches, with one being St. Pius X Church, in Lacey Township and adjacent to the Forked River CDP. In 2019 St. Mary Church in Barnegat took entire control of the school, which remained on the same Manahawkin campus, and changed its name. The other churches no longer operate the school but still may send students there.

== In the news ==
On October 11, 1989, three aides of New York business mogul Donald Trump were killed in a helicopter crash near the Garden State Parkway in Forked River. Five people, including three high-level executives of Trump's three casinos in Atlantic City, were killed when their helicopter crashed in pine woodlands.

On June 6, 1997, Melissa Drexler, known as The Prom Mom, delivered a baby in a restroom stall at her Lacey Township High School prom and threw the body in the trash before returning to the dance. She pleaded guilty to aggravated manslaughter and was sentenced to fifteen years' imprisonment. After serving nearly 37 months, she was released on parole.

== Transportation ==
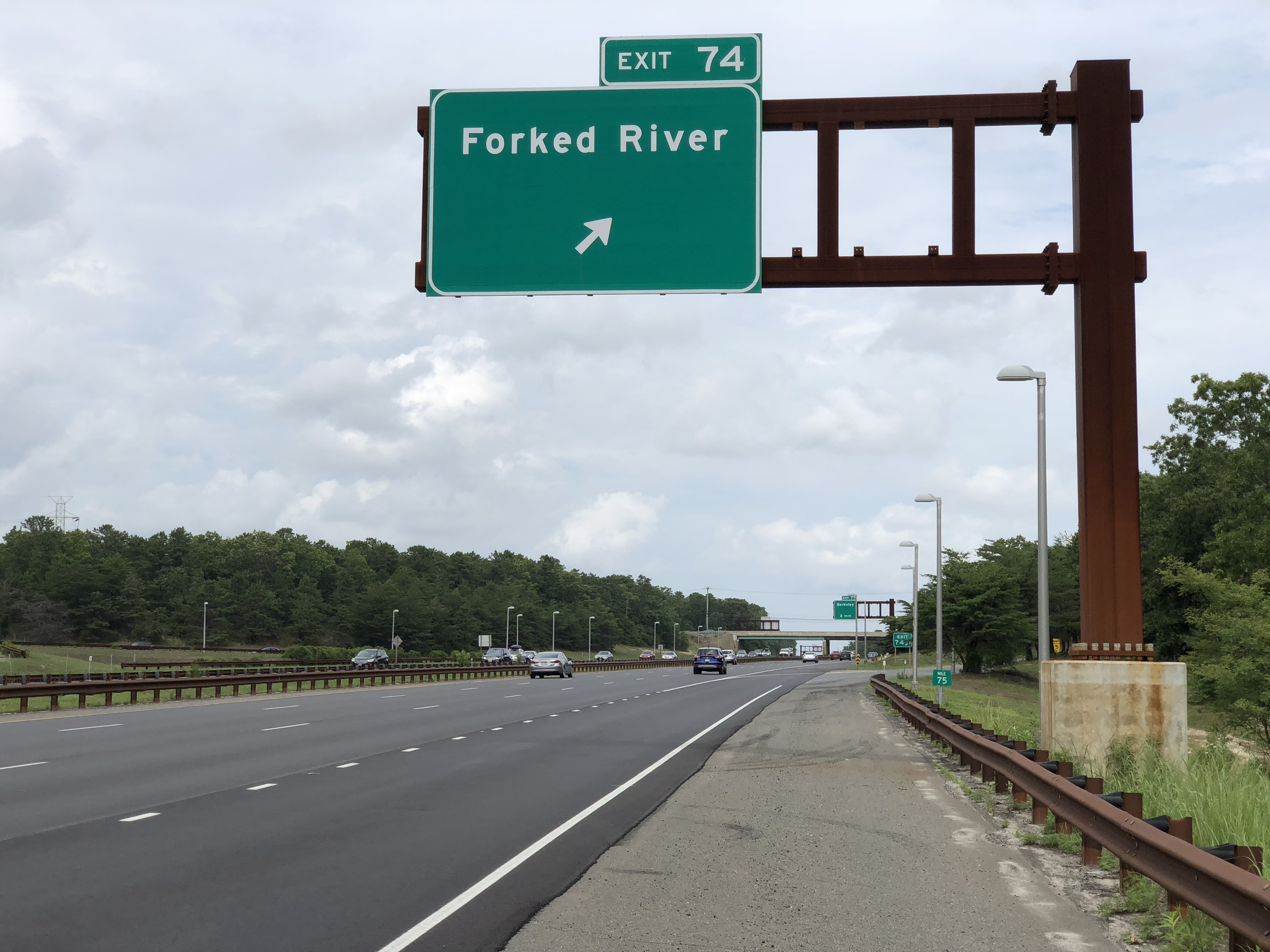
Garden State Parkway at the exit for Forked River

NJ Transit provides bus service to Atlantic City on the 559 bus route. Academy Bus provided bus service to Jersey City and New York City on the Parkway Express. Local bus service is provided by Ocean Ride. Forked River is served by U.S. Route 9 and exit 74 of the Garden State Parkway.

== Notable people ==
People who were born in, residents of, or otherwise closely associated with Forked River include:

- Christopher J. Connors (born 1956), represents the 9th legislative district in the New Jersey General Assembly
- Melissa Drexler (born 1978), Prom Mom
- Chris Fleming (born 1970), basketball player and coach
- "Irish" Teddy Mann (1951–2024), former middleweight boxing contender and author of Fighting For Redemption: The "Irish" Teddy Mann Story
- Brady Noon (born 2005), actor known for his roles in Boardwalk Empire, Good Boys and The Mighty Ducks: Game Changers
- Scott Palguta (born 1982), Head Men's Soccer Coach at Colorado College who had played with the Colorado Rapids of Major League Soccer
- Rhett Titus (born 1987), professional wrestler
