= The Story of Rimini =

1816 poem by Leigh Hunt

1816 title page. John Murray, London.

The Story of Rimini was a poem composed by Leigh Hunt, published in 1816. The work was based on his reading about Paolo and Francesca in hell. Hunt's version gives a sympathetic portrayal of how the two lovers came together after Francesca was married off to Paolo's brother. The work promotes compassion for all of humanity and the style served to contrast against the traditional 18th century poetic conventions. The work received mixed reviews, with most critics praising the language.

== Background ==
The first mention of The Story of Rimini comes in Hunt's 1811 edition of The Feast of the Poets where he alludes to writing the poem. In October 1811, Hunt started reading various works to develop a theme for his poem and he fixated on the Paolo and Francesca episode in Canto V of Dante's Inferno. The poem was originally intended to be a satire on England during 1811 but it was edited to focus on nature. Hunt travelled to Hampstead to work on his poem. However, his life was soon interrupted in 1812 when he was put on trial for libel. However, the trial was pushed back, and Hunt visited Taunton at the end of the summer. While there, he continued to work on his poem.

By September 1812, Hunt was busy at work on the poem and he remained there until his trial in December. He was sentenced to two years in prison, and he continued to work on the poem during that time. In 1813, Lord Byron, the poet, came to visit Hunt and even brought him material on Italy that helped Hunt with his poem. The poem was almost finished by the time Hunt was released from prison in 1815. To raise money to pay a 500-pound fine, he sold The Story of Rimini, The Descent of Liberty, and The Feast of the Poets to the publisher Gale, Curtis and Fenner for 450 pounds. However, Hunt did not send them the works, and the firm backed down from the deal in December 1815. In October 1816, Hunt sent portions of the work to Byron for approval, and the work was edited on the basis of his responses.

In November, Byron served as intermediary between Hunt and the publisher John Murray. On 18 December, Hunt asked for 450 to 500 pounds from Murray as an advance, but Murray believed that the work would not bring in such money. Instead, Murray proposed a limited release of the work with split profits with Hunt retaining the copyright. Hunt soon agreed to the terms as he needed the money, and the work was published in February 1816. In March, the work brought Hunt 45 pounds, and he sought to have Murray buy the rest of the copyright. Murray declined, which caused a rift between Hunt and the publisher.

A close friend of Percy Bysshe Shelley, a line from the poem, "very poetry of nature", II.47, is quoted in the 1818 edition of Frankenstein and cited as "Leigh Hunt's Rimini" in Volume 3, Chapter 1. In the 1831 edition, however, the line is quoted in Chapter 18 but there is no attribution.

== Poem ==
The Story of Rimini describes the background of Paolo and Francesca's story from Dante's Inferno. The purpose was to describe how Francesca was still able to love Paolo even though the two were in hell. The first canto of the work discusses Ravenna and how the Duke of Ravenna wishes to marry his daughter, Francesca, to Duke Giovanni of Rimini. The poem begins with a description of an urban environment that focuses on the bustle of the crowd:

For on this sparkling day, Ravenna's pride,
The daughter of their prince, becomes a bride,
A bride, to crown the comfort of the land:
And he, whose victories have obtained her hand,
Has taken with the dawn, so flies report.
His promised journey to the expecting court
With hasting pomp, and squires of high degree.
The bold Giovanni, lord of Rimini.
Already in the streets the stir grows loud
Of expectation and a bustling crowd.
With feet and voice the gathering hum contends.
The deep talk heaves, the ready laugh ascends:
Callings, and clapping doors, and curs unite.
And shouts from mere exuberance of delight,
And armed bands, making important way.
Gallant and grave, the lords of holiday.
And nodding neighbours, greeting as they run.
And pilgrims, chanting in the morning sun. (lines I:1–18)

Although the first canto ended with a marriage that seemed to be well received, the second canto describes how the marriage was problematic. Instead of Giovanni himself being there to marry, his brother Paulo was sent to serve as a proxy:

The truth was this:— The bridegroom had not come.
But sent his brother, proxy in his room.
A lofty spirit the former was, and proud,
Little gallant, and had a sort of cloud
Hanging for ever on his cold address
Which he mistook for proper manliness.
But more of this hereafter. (lines II:18–24)

After the political marriage, Francesca travels to Rimini while describing how there is little ability to make free choices in life. In Rimini, she is kept as a possession and is isolated. However, she falls in love with Paulo. After the two read the story "Launcelot of the Lake, a bright romance", they believe that the story describes their own situation. Together, they believe that they enter into a paradise type of life. Canto IV introduces how the relationship came to an end. While sleeping, Francesca speaks words that tip Giovanni off to the relationship, and he attacks Paulo. Paulo is stabbed by Giovanni, and Francesca soon after dies because she cannot bear to be without Paulo.

== Themes ==
Hunt chose the Paolo and Francesca episode from the Inferno to discuss problems relating to "setting authorized selfishness above the most natural impulses, and making guilt by mistaking innocence". The tone of the work is one of compassion, and he promoted the idea of universal restoration, a view that came from the preaching of Elhanan Winchester that was connected to the Universalism movement. Hunt's use of such beliefs was a source of criticism lodged against him. Hunt also believed that wisdom was connected to understanding the workings of the human heart, and his understanding of it in The Story of Rimini was later developed in Hunt's Christianism and The Religion of the Heart. Part of the basis for the intimacy and the emotion within the story, especially when Francesca turns to her father before she is forced into marriage, is from Hunt's own emotional reaction after he was sentenced to jail for 2 years and separated from his brother.

The landscape of Hampstead influenced the depictions of the land found within The Story of Rimini. He described the land in an impressionistic manner like a painter with a mix of his political beliefs in regards to criticising land enclosure or other rural matters. When Hunt was forced to go to Taunton, the valley became the basis for Hunt's description of Ravenna within the work. The description also marked a change in Hunt's style, as he became more spontaneous in his writing and more familiar in his tone. However, he also made sure to political and social matters. When describing urban life, Hunt was quite different from William Wordsworth's repulsion regarding crowds; Hunt focused on the sights and sounds of the crowd to represent the human community that Wordsworth ignored.

Hunt wanted the poem as a response to poetry written by those like Alexander Pope and "to break the set cadence for which Pope was the professed authority, as he broke through the set morals which had followed in reaction upon the licence of many reigns". Within the poem, Hunt attempted to follow the pattern of Wordsworth in Lyrical Ballads by relying on common speech. Hunt felt that too many works dealt with a written language and were disconnected from spoken language. This emphasis on what was deemed natural was in contrast to the 18th century emphasis on the neoclassical rules to poetry and language. Previously, those like Samuel Johnson viewed the common language like that of barbarians and that it was poetry's job to protect society against vulgarity. Although other Romantics turned to Scotland or rural England for their language, Hunt turned to Italian to basis his views of natural language.

== Critical response ==
A review in the Edinburgh Review by William Hazlitt praised the poem as a "gem of great grace and spirit, and in many passages and in many particulars, of infinite beauty and delicacy". In a letter to Hunt, Hazlitt stated, "I have read the story of Rimini with extreme satisfaction. It has many beautiful & affecting passages. You have, I think, perfectly succeeded. I like the description of the death of Francesca better than any. This will do." A review in the Quarterly Review attacked the poem, which Byron attributed to Hunt's poetic diction. Thomas Moore told Byron: "though it is, I own, full of beauties, and though I like himself sincerely, I really could not undertake to praise it seriously. There is so much of the quizzible in all he writes, that I never can put on the proper pathetic face in reading him."

Nicholas Roe claimed that "Hunt reveals a keen observation of gestures, manners and motives: he could readily turn such details to satirical effect [...] but in his poem satirical disruption is smoothed into an attractively 'fluttering impatience' for what will follow [...] Hunt's master of townscape is highlighted by Wordsworth's repulsion from crowds". He later argued: "The Story of Rimini is structurally satisfying as a narrative, opening with the springtime pageant of Paulo's arrival at Ravenna and closing with a funeral cortege and an autumnal landscape" and that it is "an artful poem about artful behaviour, in which the malign intrigue of the two dukes is doubled and answered by the gentler dissimulation of the lovers—simultaneously transgressive and a discovery of truth."
