= Melissa Drexler =

American woman convicted of manslaughter

- Born: 1978 (age 47–48)
- Criminal charges: aggravated manslaughter
- Criminal penalty: 15 years' imprisonment (37 months served)
- Criminal status: Released

Melissa Drexler, who was nicknamed in the media as "The Prom Mom", is an American woman who, as a teenage high school student in 1997, delivered a baby in a restroom stall during her high school prom dance then put the infant in the trash can and returned to the dance. The baby's body was later found in a trash bin, and Drexler pleaded guilty to aggravated manslaughter. She was sentenced to 15 years' imprisonment. After serving a little over three years, she was released on parole.

== Early life ==
Drexler was an only child from a middle-class Catholic family and lived in Forked River, New Jersey. She attended Lacey Township High School in the Lanoka Harbor section of Lacey Township, New Jersey and had plans for a career in the fashion industry.

== Pregnancy ==
Drexler kept her pregnancy secret from the baby's likely father, John Lewis, her parents, and her friends. At five feet seven inches (170 cm) tall, and about 130 pounds (59 kg), she apparently showed no signs of her pregnancy. On June 6, 1997, Drexler gave birth in a bathroom stall at her senior prom, twenty minutes after complaining of stomach cramps in the car she had arrived in. She retrieved the baby from the toilet bowl, placed it in a plastic bag, tied a knot at the top, and deposited it in a trash can. It is thought that she severed the umbilical cord on the serrated edge of a menstrual pad dispenser and suffocated the child. According to the prosecutor, a friend asked if she was all right, and she replied "I'll be done pretty soon. Go tell the boys we'll be right out." She then returned to the dance floor, ate a salad, and danced with her boyfriend. When Drexler and others who were there were asked by teachers about the blood in the bathroom, she replied that she was having a heavy menstrual period. After a maid cleaned the bloody bathroom stall, emptied the trash can, and became suspicious of the weight of the trash bag, the baby's body was discovered in a trash bag by her supervisor. A health instructor from the school, as well as EMTs, unsuccessfully tried to resuscitate the baby. The medical examiner stated he was satisfied that the infant was born alive and not a stillbirth due to the presence of air in the lungs and intestine. However, Dr. Michael Baden, a forensic pathologist hired by Drexler's family to perform a second autopsy, stated that the "findings are ambiguous as to whether the baby was alive, because of all the resuscitation that was performed."

== Criminal proceedings ==
As part of a plea agreement, Drexler pleaded guilty to aggravated manslaughter on August 20, 1998. As of 2011 court transcripts had not been released. She was sentenced to 15 years in prison. On November 26, 2001, she was freed on parole after serving three years and one month.

== See also ==
- Infanticide
- Neonaticide
- Véronique Courjault
