= Murray Grove =

Coordinates: 39.8546°N 74.179°W

Murray Grove is a Unitarian Universalist retreat and conference center in the Lanoka Harbor section of Lacey Township, New Jersey United States, traditionally considered the site where Universalism in America began.

== History ==
In 1770, Thomas Potter, an unlettered but inspired Universalist landowner living in what was then called Good Luck, New Jersey, encountered John Murray after Murray's vessel was grounded in nearby Barnegat Bay. Learning that Murray was both a Universalist and a preacher, Potter prevailed on him to preach the gospel of universal love in the meetinghouse Potter had built for that express purpose ten years earlier. Despite serious misgivings and initial resistance, Murray gave his first Universalist sermon on the North American continent on September 30, 1770. Taking the experience as a sign that God wanted him to dedicate his life to preaching Universalism, he went on to minister to the first Universalist congregation in the United States, in Gloucester, Massachusetts, and later to be centrally involved in the founding of the Universalist Church of America.

Universalist pilgrims began trekking to Good Luck in the 1830s. Unable to purchase the meetinghouse, they created what they called Murray Grove. Potter Memorial Chapel was later built for worship services, and Murray Grove House for accommodations. An addition was built in 1920. Murray Grove has been a national center of Universalism for over a century.

== Current use ==
Since the merger of the Universalists with the Unitarians in 1960 as Unitarian Universalism, Murray Grove remains a vital and active Unitarian Universalist gathering and pilgrimage site. It offers historical tours as well as space for groups to hold their own retreats and conferences. Regular programs are presented, especially including the Homecoming celebration the last Saturday of each September.
