= Skinner House Books =

American book publisher

- Parent company: Unitarian Universalist Association
- Founded: 1976
- Country of origin: United States
- Headquarters location: Boston
- Key people: Skinner House Board
- Fiction genres: meditation manuals, worship and church resources, and books on theology
- Official website: www.uua.org/publications/skinnerhouse

Skinner House Books is a book publisher run by the Unitarian Universalist Association (UUA), specializing in books for Unitarian Universalists—meditation manuals, worship and church resources, and books on theology, UU history, and social justice concerns. The editorial direction of Skinner House is provided by the Skinner House Board, a body of UUA staff and non-staff.

The publisher began as an imprint of Beacon Press in 1976, and later split off, with its own name. Skinner House Books is named after Clarence Skinner (1881–1949), a Universalist minister, writer, and social activist who was Dean of the Crane Theological School at Tufts University.
