= G. Vincent Runyon =

American Universalist

G. Vincent Runyon was an American Universalist, formally Methodist minister and author of the booklet, Why I Left the Ministry and Became an Atheist (San Diego, 1959). He was from 1929 a Universalist Church minister at Binghamton, New York. His booklet was reviewed in The New York Times Book Review.
