= Elhanan Winchester =

American theologian (1751–1797)

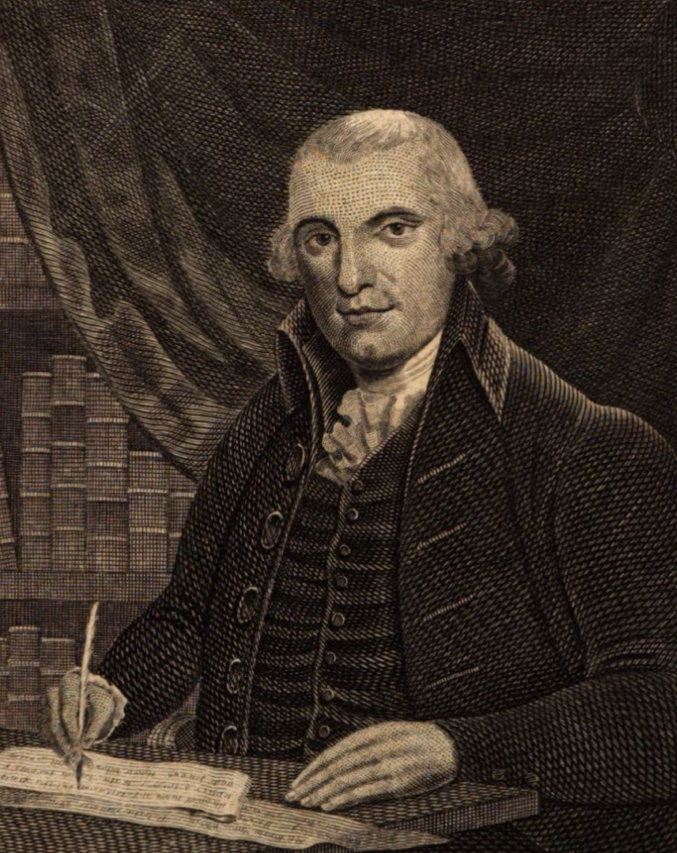
- Born: September 30, 1751; Brookline, Massachusetts, British North America
- Died: April 18, 1797 (aged 45); Hartford, Connecticut, U.S.
- Occupations: Minister; theologian
- Years active: 1771–1797
- Known for: Universal Restoration
- Notable work: Dialogues on Universal Restoration
- Spouses: Alice Rogers (m. 1769; died 1776) Sarah Peck (m. 1776; died 1777) Sarah Luke (m. 1778; died 1779) Mary Morgan (m. 1781; died 1783) Maria Knowles (m. 1784)
- Children: 8

Elhanan Winchester (September 30, 1751 – April 18, 1797) was an American theologian who explored numerous theological paths before becoming an advocate for universal restoration. As a result, Winchester is considered among the early leaders of American Universalism.

== Early life ==
Elhanan Winchester was born on September 30, 1751, in the small town of Muddy Water Village, later known as Brookline, Massachusetts, located 30 miles southwest of Boston. He was the eldest son of Elhanan Winchester (1719–1810) and his second wife, Sarah Belcher (1729–1760). The senior Winchester, a fourth-generation Massachusetts colonist, was married three times and sired sixteen children.

The elder Winchester was a farmer and shoemaker. He was well-known and held administrative offices in the village. He was a member of the town's Congregationalist First Church, where he occasionally preached, leading him to be called Deacon Winchester.

Later, the evangelical revivalist movement known as the First Great Awakening, led by Anglican cleric Rev. George Whitefield influenced Deacon Winchester. Deacon Winchester opened his home for services to Whitefield's followers, known as New Lights. As the number of followers grew, Deacon Winchester built a new home with a hall to accommodate the growing number of the sect's followers.

Whitefield's revivalist New Lights movement had a lasting influence on the young Winchester. He retained Whitefield's revivalist and evangelical preaching style throughout his ministerial career.

== Education ==
Elhanan Winchester had limited formal education. He furthered his education primarily by self-study, mastering Latin, French, Greek, and acquiring a foundational command of Hebrew which he used to enhance his biblical scholarship. Winchester had a prodigious memory and great eloquence—skills he used throughout his ministerial career.

== Personal life ==
Winchester's personal life was filled with tragedy. When he was eight, his mother died giving birth to his brother Benjamin. Four of his five wives died. Of his eight children, most died at or near childbirth. Only one survived infancy, Reconcile, who lived 17 months and died on September 20, 1773. At his death in 1797, at the age of 45, his only survivor was his fifth wife.

His wives were:

- Alice Rogers (1750–1776) of Rowley, Massachusetts, married 1769, died in Fairfax County, Virginia, in 1776.
- Sarah Peck (1738–1777) of Rehoboth, Massachusetts, married 1776, died in Welch Neck, South Carolina, in 1777.
- Sarah Luke (?–1779) of South Carolina, married 1778, died in Welch Neck, South Carolina, in 1779.
- Mary Morgan (?–1783) a widow from Philadelphia, married 1781, died in 1783.
- Maria Knowles (1750–1816) a widow from Philadelphia, married October 18, 1784, survived her husband and died in Virginia.

== Theological development ==
Winchester, at the age of 19, married his first wife, Alice Rogers, in the fall of 1769. In that same year, he joined the Brookline New Lights Church and began his ministerial career preaching at the church.

Winchester's ministerial career was fluid. It was not uncommon for him to fully embrace one theological principle only to abandon it, seemingly capriciously, and then embrace a completely contradictory set of theological tenets.

His unsettled theological pursuits were resolved in 1778 when he read The Everlasting Gospel. Written under the pseudonym of Paul Siegvolck, Georg Klein-Nicolai published a German edition in 1705. Winchester credits reading an English edition in 1778 for his acceptance of the universal reconciliation of all souls with their Creator. He remained committed to universal reconciliation until his death in 1797.

Winchester reflected many of the ideas in the Everlasting Gospel in his 1788 work Elhanan Winchester: Dialogues on Universal Restoration. He reasoned that errors in biblical scholarship incorrectly condemned souls to perpetual damnation. In particular, he noted the translation of the Hebrew words adon olam and the Greek word aion did not mean "eternal." The correct translation, he argued, was only a reference to a limited unit of time. Similarly, he argued that sin was finite, not infinite, and therefore could not incur the wrath of endless punishment. Underscoring the value Winchester placed in Klein-Nicolai's Everlasting Gospel, he published another edition in London in 1792.

== Early ministerial career ==
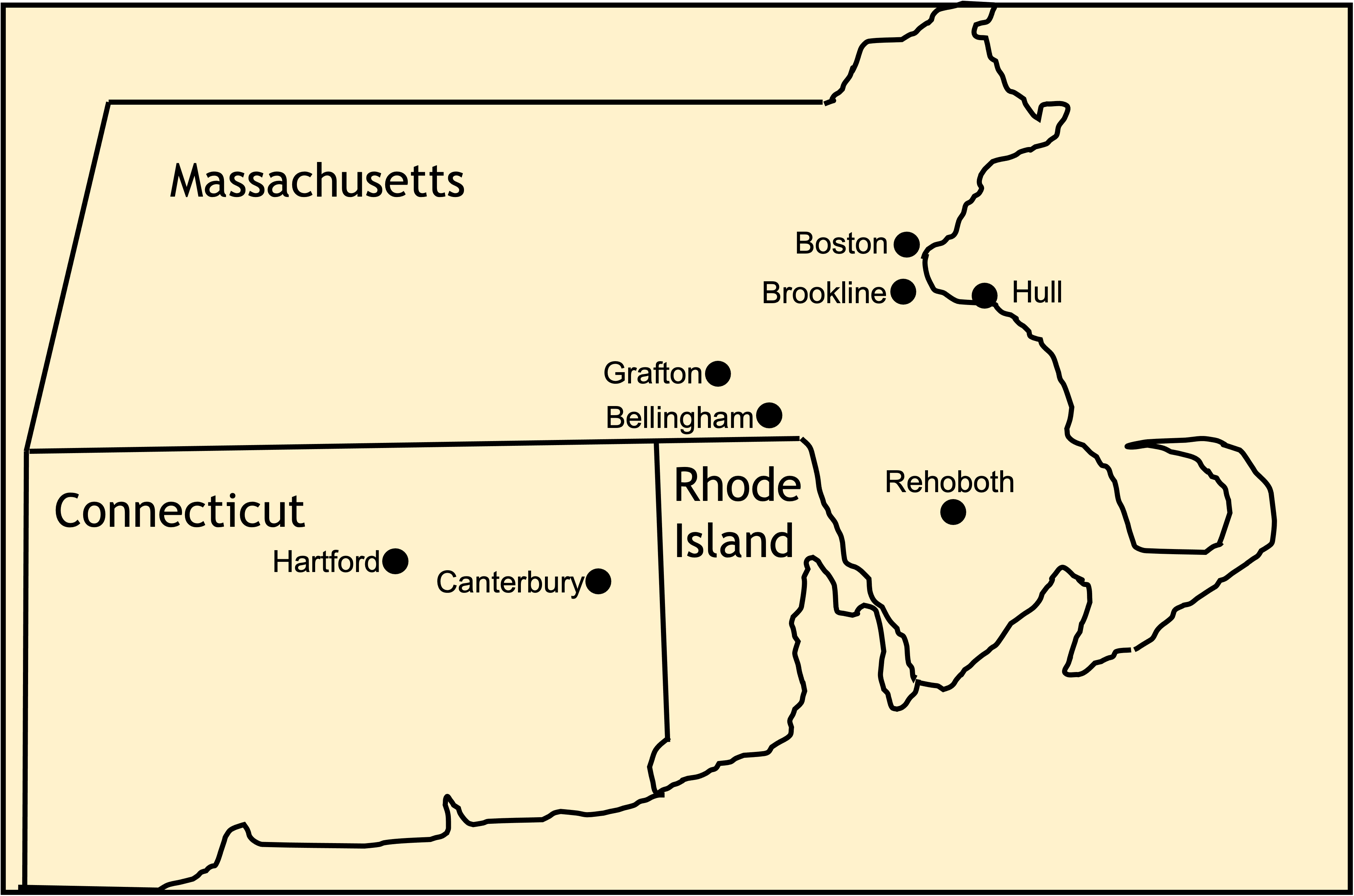
New England Cities Where Rev. Winchester Preached

=== Brookline Congregational Separate Church ===
Winchester's preaching career at the Brookline Separate Church was short-lived when a maid of his father became pregnant and named Elhanan as the father. Only one primary historical account was found of this event in Isaac Backus's History of New England with Particular Attention to the Denomination Called Baptists. However, subsequent actions in Winchester's life appear to support Backus's observation.

=== Canterbury Free Will Baptist Church (1771) ===
Two years after he began preaching in his father's church, Winchester left Brookline in 1771 and undertook a 60-mile journey to Canterbury, Connecticut. There he visited the Free Will Baptist Church of Elder Ebenezer Lyon.

Established in 1711, the Congregational church in Canterbury was not immune to the influences of the First Great Awakening revivalist movement. In 1745, a separate church of Canterbury was formed on New Light principles and renounced fellowship with the established churches in the Standing Order. Despite its renunciation, the taxation system still compelled the Separates to fund the operation of the Standing Order churches. Under this financial strain and the stress of operating a church outside the community's religious norms, the Separate church floundered.

Winchester's visit coincided with the Baptist minister, Ebenezer Lyon, gathering Separates and others from the Congregational church into a shared community. Lyon offered this community open communion. Allowing all, regardless of baptismal ritual, infant sprinkling or adult immersion, to come to the Lord's Table. Ebenezer Lyon received the young Winchester into this Baptist church and baptized him, via immersion.

Winchester's conversion from a Separate Congregational New Light to a Separate Baptist church was not uncommon. Both Congregational and Baptist Separates, influenced by the First Great Awakening, shared a common desire for a more biblical and simpler form of worship.

=== Rehoboth Baptist Church (1771–1772) ===
After leaving Connecticut in the spring of 1771, Winchester and his wife settled in Rehoboth, Massachusetts. Rehoboth and nearby Swansea had long been centers of Baptist activity.

Winchester was likely drawn to Rehoboth by the presence of established Baptist churches and a religious revival sweeping the area. The Baptist churches in Swansea and Rehoboth had recently added several hundred members. The twenty-year-old Winchester assisted the Rehoboth church's 59-year-old minister, John Hicks. The church ordained Hicks in 1762, but a few years later, the church witnessed a severe drop in membership when many immigrated to Nova Scotia. An effort was now underway to rebuild the church membership.

Hicks began that rebuilding effort in 1771. He baptized 40 people before falling ill. Winchester stepped in, baptizing 20 more people. With renewed membership, Ebenezer Lyon traveled from Canterbury and ordained Winchester on September 4, 1771.

A noted Congregational minister and later president of Yale College, Ezra Stiles, recorded Winchester's ordination in his September 19–20 diary entry. The entry also revealed the disdain that orthodox Congregational ministers had for the Separate Baptists. The term "separate" was frequently applied to both Congregational and Baptist churches denoting them as not adhering to the dogma of either the Congregational Standing Order or within an established Baptist association. Stiles wrote (text corrected to modern English), "A New Light Baptist Elder from about Pomfret (near Canterbury) was the only Elder present & performed the Ordination in a boisterous if not blasphemous manner." Stiles continued, "These New Lights Baptist Teachers go about ordaining many that are by no means fit for the sacred Office, some that are fitter for Confinement in a Madhouse a few months, then for the pulpit."

Winchester, now the minister of the Rehoboth church, adopted Lyon's open communion policy, also known as mixed communion.

It is unknown if Winchester was fully aware of the controversy the open communion policy engendered among Baptists. Infant baptism had been a tradition that signified the inclusion of an infant into a church community. Once included, the infant would be nurtured into the faith. The First Great Awakening questioned the validity of passive infant baptism. The revivalist fervor demanded that an intentional new birth event was necessary to enter the faith. This regeneration was expressed by a personal profession of faith in Jesus Christ. This emphasis on a new birth experience led many Baptists to abandon passive infant baptism and adopt an intentional baptism, also known as believer baptism, through immersion as the only acceptable form.

Winchester's open communion policy was short-lived. A 1772 church council questioning this communion policy split the church between those favoring open and those favoring closed communion. The closed communion adherents organized a new church selecting Jacob Hicks, the eldest son of the former pastor, as their minister. The open communion members stayed with the established church and continued with Winchester as their minister.

Another crisis over Winchester's communion policy erupted eight months later. After senior Baptist ministers approached the young Winchester and discussed his communion policy, he changed his position. Winchester abandoned open communion and declared a church policy of closed communion. Church members claiming Winchester had broken his covenant with them removed his preaching privileges. Winchester defended his reversal by calling another council of Baptist churches. That council rebuked him and advised him to confess his imprudence. He was encouraged to seek membership in another church. The church in Bellingham Massachusetts received Winchester into their membership.

=== Bellingham (1772–1776) ===
The Bellingham First Baptist Church, organized in 1750, had called Elder Noah Alden as its second minister in 1766. Elder Alden described the church's Calvinist doctrine as "holding the Doctrine of Original sin, Universal Depravity, Absolute, Eternal, Unconditional, Personal Election."

Just 21 years old and shaken by the outcome of his first ministerial experience, Winchester appeared susceptible to the Calvinist rigors of the Bellingham church. He renounced his Arminian sentiments and embraced sterner views consistent with [hyper-Calvinism]. Years later, Winchester reflecting on this time, described himself as "one of the most thorough Calvinists upon the Continent."

Winchester remained a member of the Bellingham church until March 1776, when the church released him from their membership roll so he could join the Welch Neck Pee Dee River Baptist Church in South Carolina.

=== Grafton and elsewhere (1772–1774) ===
Most likely, at the urging of Elder Alden, Winchester moved to the nearby town of Grafton. Elder Noah Alden had been involved in organizing the Grafton church in 1767. Winchester preached at Grafton but did not serve as its minister. He spent the next two years preaching in the neighboring towns of Northridge and Upton. He even spent some time preaching in Hull, located on a peninsular point in Boston Harbor.

=== Welch Neck (1775–1779) ===
In the fall of 1774, Winchester traveled to Charleston, South Carolina. It is not known what arrangements Winchester made before traveling to South Carolina. It is a reasonable assumption that upon his arrival in South Carolina, Rev. Oliver Hart, the minister of the Charleston Baptist Church since 1750, greeted Winchester. Hart had also been instrumental in organizing the Charleston Baptist Association in 1751. The founding churches of that Association included Ashley River, Euhaw, and Welch Neck. It is assumed that Hart brokered Winchester's settlement at Welch Neck.

Nearly 40 years earlier, in 1737, Baptists from the Welch Tract in Delaware moved to South Carolina and settled near the Pee Dee River. They named their new home Welch Neck in remembrance of their former residence.

The Welch Neck elders affirmed to Winchester the church's devotion to Calvinism in a March 12, 1775 letter.

The Church of Christ at Welch Tract, Pee Dee in South Carolina, holding the Doctrine of Election, particular addressed to Redemption; final perseverance; believes baptism, &c to the Revd. Elhanan Winchester sendeth greeting.

This Particular Baptist society aligned with Winchester's Calvinist beliefs that he adopted in Bellingham. He remained their minister until 1779.

His Welch Neck ministry had many successes, including baptizing many new members, both white and black. By the time Winchester departed in September 1779, the church rolls reflected over 220 white members. A year earlier, Winchester had also opened baptism to "servants" (i.e., slaves) of church members. No total of the considerable number of black members, constituted in a separate church district, appears in the church records.

Shortly after the death of his third wife in the fall of 1779, Winchester departed Welch Neck for an extended trip to New England. The church elders then scrutinized Winchester's newly added members and declared many of them deficient. "A great many of those baptized by Mr. Winchester have been excommunicated, both white and black; but the greater number of blacks; many of the latter upon examination, appeared to be very Ignorant of the nature of true religion".

A comment in the September 1779 meeting minutes, apparently written sometime after Winchester's departure, alludes to Winchester's faltering Calvinist bona fides. "Soon after Mr. Winchester left Pee Dee, he fell into the error of universal restoration, which he first published in Philadelphia, where after baptizing a great many, he was the means of dividing the Baptist Church in that city."

=== Philadelphia First Baptist Church (1780–1781) ===
The ministry of the historic First Baptist Church of Philadelphia, established in 1698, was severely impacted by the American Revolutionary War (1775-1783), with many prominent members and ministers engaged in the war effort.

A 1779 self-assessment revealed the bleak condition of the church. "We have been for a long time as sheep having no shepherd, and the consequence has been that we have strayed one from another." The church elders sought to rectify this situation by hiring a minister. Taking advantage of his travel back to Welch Neck, Winchester was in Philadelphia as a representative of the New England Warren Baptist Association, attending the annual meeting of the Philadelphia Baptist Association. At that meeting, the elders offered Winchester the church pulpit in October 1780.

Winchester was known to the elders. In 1775, following the resignation of their then-minister, Rev. William Rodgers, the church unsuccessfully attempted to secure Winchester's services, who was then attending the Philadelphia Baptist Association's annual meeting as a representative of the South Carolina Charleston Baptist Association.

In accepting this recent call, Winchester artfully deflected his obligation to his Welch Neck church, indicating that before his departure he had secured the services of another minister for his South Carolina society if he should fail to return.

Winchester's ministry at the First Baptist Church was an instant success. He preached to large crowds at the church and then moved to larger facilities to accommodate the ever-increasing number of people coming to hear him. Five months later, in March 1781, everything changed.

== Evolution to universal restoration ==
The undoing of Winchester's ministry at the First Baptist Church was rooted in his failure to share with the church elders his wavering doubts about Calvinism. Two years before arriving in Philadelphia Winchester's theological belief system was evolving again, leaving him, as he self-described, as "half a convert to the doctrine of Restoration."

This evolution began late in his Welch Neck ministry. In 1778, Winchester scanned a borrowed copy of Klein-Nicolai's The Everlasting Gospel. The book advocated for the scriptural support of the eventual salvation of all souls. The book provoked Winchester's curiosity, but he noted upon returning the book to its owner he "had no serious thoughts" about the validity of universal salvation.

Not long afterward, Winchester again obtained another copy of Klein-Nicolai's book. "I read a little more therein, but as yet had not the least thought that ever I should embrace his sentiments; yet some of his arguments appeared very conclusive, and I could not wholly shake them off, but I concluded to let them alone, and not investigate the matter."

He continued to evolve his thinking on universal restoration as he traveled and preached in New England for nine months following his departure from South Carolina in September 1779.

Now in the pulpit of Philadelphia's First Baptist church, he publicly remained silent on his emerging restoration leanings. In confidence, he privately shared his growing doubts on Calvinist doctrine to a close circle of friends. This confidence was broken, resulting in a church-wide controversy over the heretical beliefs of the church's minister.

The controversy was the only topic at a March 5, 1781, church meeting. The meeting minutes read, "It being mentioned in the church that Mr. Winchester held the doctrine of universal restoration . . .” The meeting concluded with 92 members signing a protest against Winchester preaching his “most dangerous heresy."

=== Society of Universal Baptists ===
Winchester responded to this rebuke by preaching a sermon a few weeks later, on April 22, 1781, entitled "The Seeds of the Woman Bruising the Serpent's Head". The sermon was a contrast between a Calvinist God intent to save just a select few with an idea of a God of love whose intent was only good for all his creations. The sermon was a clear indication that Winchester was no longer willing to suppress his new beliefs.

Those opposing Winchester's "dangerous heresy" insisted he cease preaching. He refused. The controversy was elevated to the Philadelphia Baptist Association. The Association issued a resolution that churches should "beware of Elhanan Winchester, and not to admit him, or any who advocate 'universal salvation.'"

The Philadelphia church was roiled in controversy. Winchester's followers even attempted to take physical possession of the church. The takeover was foiled when a lawsuit was decided against them in July 1784. In December, Winchester and his followers were excommunicated from the First Baptist Church.

Historical references to the number of people who followed Winchester have varied. Winchester repeatedly stated, "I believe near a hundred of the members suffered themselves to be excommunicated rather than to sign the protest against me, and the doctrine that I preached." The contemporary records of the First Baptist Church reported that 46 individuals were excommunicated. The records further noted, "Some of these subsequently saw their error, and sought restoration to the fellowship of the church." Given the motivation of each party in this controversy to claim vindication, the actual number of those who departed and joined Winchester may never be known.

Regardless of the actual number who followed Winchester from the First Baptist Church, he had sufficient support to organize a new church called the Society of Universal Baptists. While Winchester and his followers awaited the disposition of their legal challenge to take possession of the First Baptist Church, they met in space provided by Pennsylvania University. Afterward, they built their own meetinghouse in the city on Lombard Street.

Winchester addressed his expulsion and that of his followers in a January 4, 1782 sermon entitled The Outcasts Comforted. As his sermon title indicated, he dedicated a large portion of his sermon comforting his expelled flock. Likening their experience to that of the many Christians who have been persecuted for their beliefs. "Blessed are thy who are persecuted for righteousness's sake, for theirs is the Kingdom of God." Winchester made clear that the restoration of all things was tied to scripture. He emphasized that the "blood of Jesus Christ was freely shed for all; the other, that his blood is infinitely sufficient to cleanse and purify all. Concluding, "the cause is God's and not ours."

=== Circle of advocates ===
During this time, Winchester expanded his circle of fellow advocates of universal salvation. He developed a friendship with George de Benneville (1703-1793). De Benneville is frequently cited as the first preacher of universal salvation in America. Born to aristocratic Huguenot French parents, de Benneville emigrated to America in 1741 and settled in eastern Pennsylvania. Reflective of his admiration for de Benneville, Winchester translated the French version of de Benneville's manuscript, Some Remarkable Passages in the Life of Dr. George de Benneville. In an edition of this same work published in England in 1791, Winchester wrote in the Translator's Preface, "I bless God that I was ever acquainted with Dr. George de Benneville, for such a humble, pious, loving man I have scarcely ever seen in my pilgrimage through life."

The community in which de Benneville lived also influenced Winchester's adoption of restoration. Eastern Pennsylvania was also home to communities of pious people such as the Schwarzenau Brethren. The Schwarzenau Brethren were also called the German Baptist Brethren, Tunkers, or more commonly, the Brethren.

Morgan Edwards, a Baptist minister and historian, once shared with Winchester about the Brethren saying, "God will always have a visible people on earth, and these are his people at present above any other people in the world." Roger E. Sappington observed in his book The Brethren in the Carolinas that the "Brethren’s emphasis on the New Testament and its pattern of God's love through Christ had made the Brethren susceptible to the wiles of Universalism in the first place."

Christopher Sauer, a member of the Brethren community, published the English version of The Everlasting Gospel in 1753 that influenced Winchester.

Others in Winchester's circle of advocates included Benjamin Rush and John Murray.

Rush, a physician and signer of the Declaration of Independence, attended Winchester's services, corresponded with Winchester during his stay in London, and, when needed, rendered medical attention. Rush's relationship with Winchester may have been based more on friendship than ardent religious affiliation. In a letter to John Adams, Rush describes his religious views as "a compound of the orthodoxy and heterodoxy of most of our Christian churches."

Murray, credited as a founder of American Universalism, also corresponded and traveled from New England to visit Winchester in Philadelphia. Murray and Winchester never drew close. Murray had reservations about Winchester's theology. Murray's theology was based on James Relly's Union between Christ and humankind that brought about salvation. Winchester believed that sin required harsh curative torment in the afterlife resulting in the eventual salvation of all souls. Despite these differences, Murray and Winchester were highly regarded among the budding communities of Universalists in New England and cooperated as needed.

=== Oxford Massachusetts Meeting (1785) ===
In April 1785, Universalists in Oxford, Massachusetts, organized the Second Religious Society, sometimes known as the Oxford Universalist Society. The church elders were aware of the obstacles a religious society faced that was organized outside the Congregationalist Standing Order. Congregationalism was dominant on the religious landscape and enjoyed tax‐supported benefits as the religious establishment in Massachusetts and Connecticut.

Universalists were new to this religious landscape, enjoyed no tax-supported benefits, and were generally viewed as suspicious Christians. The Oxford society, seeking support, invited John Murray and Elhanan Winchester to attend an October 1785 organizational meeting of New England Universalists. In their letter to Murray, they wrote that the government "will make the most scrutinous investigation . . . to know who are to be denominated Christians in the Commonwealth." They stressed, "our strength depends on our being cemented together in one united body."

Rev. Murray had only six years earlier, in 1779, organized dissident members of the Gloucester First Parish Church into the Independent Christian Church, considered the first Universalist society in America.

The objectives of the Oxford meeting were modest—determine a name for the collective association, explore common interests, consider holding a yearly gathering of society representatives and establish correspondence secretaries to maintain regular contact. Winchester served as the moderator. Representatives named their association the Independent Christian Societies, Commonly Called Universalists, with each society pledging "to assist each other at any and all times when occasion shall require." The association of Independent Christian Societies held only three annual meetings before dissolving.

=== London (1781–1794) ===
His American biographer, Edwin Martin Stone, provided only limited insight into why Winchester moved to London with his fifth wife in September 1787. He observed that "For a number of years. Mr. Winchester has been impressed that it was his duty to preach the gospel in England."

Winchester's later correspondence from London revealed that he had planned to spend only "a season" in London. Winchester confessed that he booked his passage to London on a rather impulsive response to an advertisement for a ship soon to sail. However, Winchester's actions appear less impulsive and more calculated when his relationship with English Universalists is understood.

=== London Universalists ===
The first London Universalist society was organized in 1778. British Universalists differed from their American counterparts both on the source of their inspiration and the outcomes they wished their religion to achieve. British Universalists drew less from the writings of Klein-Nicolai and more from the mystic writings of William Law and Jakob Böhme. Their Universalism was syncretic, an amalgamation of Renaissance enlightenment and biblical prophecy that proclaimed the imminence of the millennium and the restoration of all things. Their Universalism was a vehicle to seek a just and equal ideal society. They called their society Philadelphian.

The doyen of this Universalist society was Rev. Richard Clarke. He was a prolific writer and dynamic preacher who had connections to America and Winchester. From 1753 to 1758, Clarke served as the rector of the leading Anglican church, St. Phillip's, in Charleston, South Carolina. After Winchester preached his sermon The Outcasts Comforted, Clarke published the sermon and noted Winchester's views were warmly received in London society.

Joan Patricia Christodoulou claimed in her 1988 thesis, The Universalists: Radical Sectarianism (1760-1850), that Clarke's "dynamic of radical political principle with mystical Behmenist theosophy also characterized the universalism of [his] protégé, the American evangelist Elhanan Winchester".

It is difficult to independently verify Christodoulou's claim. Winchester's London sermons and writings echoed Clarke's millennial expectations and the power of prophecy to bring about a restitution of all things. Winchester saw the restitution of all things in a more spiritual sense, unlike Clarke and other local Universalists who viewed their efforts in a political, social justice light.

Millennial expectations, however, were not foreign to Winchester. His 1781 sermon, The Outcasts Comforted, included millennial references. With the popularity of millennialism in London society, Winchester appeared to have exploited this fashion and leaned more heavily into millennialism. In his 1788 sermon, A Century on the Glorious Revolution, Winchester concluded with a detailed explanation of his millennialist views, "Then comes that glorious period of a thousand years, when peace, harmony, prosperity, love, and the knowledge and glory of God shall fill the earth as the waters cover the sea."

=== Ministry in London ===
London's Universalists welcomed Winchester into their liberal-minded and socially active circle when he arrived in the city in September 1787. Winchester was familiar with this group, having corresponded with these Universalists. One of Winchester's letters of introduction was to John Clegg, the brother of Edmund Clegg. Edmund Clegg, a founding member of the London Universalist society, had moved to Philadelphia to open a textile manufacturing facility and visited Winchester upon his arrival in Philadelphia. Clegg preached at Winchester's Society of Universal Baptist Church. Winchester also carried a letter of introduction from Benjamin Rush.

The London public initially coolly received Winchester. He preached wherever a chapel or church opened its doors. The increasing number of people coming to hear Winchester aroused critics within the Calvinist orthodox community. Baptist churches in Blackfields and Moorfields, once opened to him, now closed their doors.

Despite the loss of these churches, Winchester's popularity steadily grew, and other facilities opened their doors. In north London, there was a time he preached in the mornings at the General Baptist Glass House Yard chapel and preached in the evenings at the General Baptist church on Worship Street. In 1792 he secured a regular meeting space at a former General Baptist chapel at Parliament Court on the eastern edge of London. He preached there until he departed for America in 1794.

=== Universal Baptist Church at Parliament Court (1793–1794) ===
Winchester's flock was composed of dissenters from mainstream religious orthodoxy. Faithful to the heritage of English Universalism, they called themselves Philadelphians. In February 1793, Winchester formally organized his congregation, known both as the Universal Baptists and the Ethical Society. The Conway Hall Ethical Society, the oldest surviving freethought organization in the world, traces its founding back to Winchester.

After Winchester returned to America, a former Calvinist Baptist minister now restoration advocate, Rev. William Vidler, filled the pulpit. Like Winchester, Vidler had been a Calvinist Baptist minister in good standing until he was separated from his church due to his restorationist leanings.

== Return to America ==
Without informing anyone, Winchester abruptly departed London in May 1794. His biographer alluded to a personal matter that prompted his return, stating, "He came to America alone." Winchester later explained his departure in a letter to a London colleague. In that letter Winchester was explicit that he fled his London residence due to his wife, Maria Knowles. "I tell you that I have been driven from my own house by the hands of my wife."

The separation was not long-lived. Seven months later, Mrs. Winchester sailed for America and was reunited with her husband.

Arriving in Boston from London, Winchester began to travel and preach. He preached in his hometown of Brookline and other familiar towns such as Roxbury, Grafton, Hull, Canterbury, and Oxford. He temporarily filled the pulpit at Rev. John Murray's society. He wrote to his brother, "I never saw the country so open to me as it is now. I preached twenty-five sermons in the month of September, which considering my state of weakness, is as much as I could expect."

=== Ordination of Hosea Ballou ===
In October 1794, Winchester again attended a meeting of Oxford's Universalists. As noted earlier the Independent Christian Societies association, formed in 1785, was no longer active. However, the Second Religious Society of Oxford continued to hold an annual meeting with local Universalist societies. Some historical accounts refer to these meetings as the General Convention of Universalists, that term, however, does not appear in the Oxford meeting minutes.

At the Oxford meeting, Winchester, now in the closing years of his ministry, ordained the 23 year-old Hosea Ballou. Ballou had only been preaching for three years and had not sought ordination. After Ballou finished his sermon, Winchester rose and, without warning, held the Bible against Ballou's chest, crying out, "Brother Ballou, I press to your heart the written Jehovah!" Ironically, Ballou's teachings of Universalism would eclipse those of Winchester and Murray.

== Death ==
In February 1796, Winchester returned to Philadelphia, where his health sharply declined. Dr. Benjamin Rush attended to him and successfully arrested the hemorrhaging in Winchester's lungs. By June he was sufficiently recovered to travel to New York and then onto Hartford, where the Winchesters had purchased a small farm. They arrived in Hartford in October 1796.

Although in failing health, Winchester raised his last congregation in Hartford. The gathering of his flock followed a funeral oration that Winchester spontaneously preached at the graveside of a total stranger. Clothed in his cleric garb, he approached the graveside and spoke from John 11:25, "I am the resurrection and the life. The one who believes in me will live, even though they die." Those at the gravesite, rather than respond negatively to what could have been deemed an intrusion on the sacred burial ritual, welcomed Winchester.

This event was the start of Winchester gathering a small flock. Over time, a theater was secured and a respectable congregation gathered. In early April, he delivered what would be his last sermon. Fittingly, that sermon was based on Paul's farewell address to the Ephesian church.

On the day he died he asked those around him to sing with him, "Farewell Friends in Christ." He died on April 18, 1797. He was 46 years and five months old.

Rev. Nathan Strong conducted the funeral service at the Hartford Center Presbyterian Church. Winchester was buried in the Old Burying Ground in the rear of the church. His memorial stone, erected in 1803, includes an inscription by Rev. George Richards, a devoted Restorationist.

The General Convention

of The Universalist Church In Memory of their dear departed Brother, The Rev. Elhanan Winchester, Erected This Monumental Stone. He Died April 18, 1797 Aged 46 Years

'Twas thine to preach with animated zeal The glories of the restitution morn,

When sin, death, hell, the pow'r of Christ shall feel And light, life immortality be born.

Two months later in London, Rev. William Vilder preached a funeral sermon honoring Winchester. Vilder remarked, "When I consider our deceased friend, whether I view him as a man, a Christian, a minister of the Gospel, or a writer in defence of divine truth, I can but place him in the foremost rank of men, of Christians, of ministers, and of Christian writers."

== Publications ==
Winchester was a prolific author and used his many publications to spread his message and generate income. Below is a list of his published sermons, books, and poems. The works are identified by truncated titles.

- 1773: New Book of Poems on Several Occasions
- 1774: The Reigning Abominations, Especially the Slave Trade
- 1781: The Seed of the Woman Bruising the Serpent's Head
- 1782: The Outcasts Comforted
- 1783: The Gospel Preached by the Apostles
- 1788: Dialogue on Universal Restoration, Exhibited in Four Dialogues
- 1779: A Letter to the Rev. C.E. De Coetlogon
- 1789: A Course of Lectures on the Prophecies That Remain to Be Fulfilled (4 vols., 1789)
- 1792: Re-published Klein Nicolai's Everlasting Gospel
- 1792: Oration on the Discovery of America, delivered in London
- 1792: An Elegy on the Death of the Rev. John Wesley
- 1793: Some Remarkable Passages in the Life of Dr. George de Benneville
- 1793: The Process and Empire of Christ
- 1793: The Three Woe Trumpets
- 1796: A Defense of Revelation in Ten Letters to Thomas Paine
- 1796: A Plain Political Catechism
- 1797: The Psalms of David

== Theology ==
Elhanan Winchester's search for spiritual truth and meaning was a journey of constancy and abrupt re-invention. He retained his childhood Calvinist belief in the sovereignty of the Creator. He never wavered from general Christian orthodoxy. He was a trinitarian, he preached the doctrine of revelation, believed in the divinity of Christ, and substitutionary atonement. He was a pre-millennialist and believed firmly in the judgment of the second coming of Christ.

The theological evolution of Winchester had gone through a number of transitions from one denomination to another. He was first a believer of the New Light Congregationalism faith of his father until he converted to being a Baptist. During this time, he had also thought about becoming an Arminianist and a hyper-Calvinist but eventually did not pursue either of them. He finally became a proponent of the universal restoration idea wherein he believed that everyone would be restored someday despite not being among the saved.

Elhanan Winchester's seemingly erratic theological alignments may have been a function of his limited formal education, the early age when he began preaching, the era of religious fervor in which he lived, his inquisitive mind, and his biblical scholarship. Winchester's theological development also benefited from his relationship with others with intellectual curiosity, such as George de Benneville, Benjamin Rush, John Murray, William Vilder, and other English Universalists.

== Universal value of restoration ==
Winchester believed that universal salvation was not only a restorative force in the spiritual lives of individuals but also a harmonizing force within Christianity.

Universal restoration offers individuals relief from the unknowing, unavoidable, and maybe capricious intent of a creator to save some and condemn others. "The belief of the Restoration is of great use in supporting good people under their sorrows and trials here; the idea that evil shall be destroyed, and all things restored to their primitive glory is the most consolatory of all other ideas."

Universal restoration also offered a way to harmonize what Winchester perceived as the irreconcilable discord generated by Arminian and Calvinist systems. Any reconciliation would require believers in either system to surrender a core belief and embrace an antithetical belief. Calvinists would be required to gainsay God's sovereign power to select those who are saved and Arminians to forego human free will to accept or reject God's offer of salvation through faith in Jesus. Winchester offered a middle ground.

He articulated his middle ground in rhetorical arguments constructed from compound observations, one from each belief system. Consider this one example.

Calvinism affirms that all God's desires cannot be thwarted and will be fulfilled, and Arminianism affirms that God desires that all people to be saved. Winchester then concluded, since God's desires cannot be thwarted (Calvinism), therefore God's will to save all will be achieved (Arminianism).

With the belief that the scriptural evidence of God's intent was so self-evident, he, maybe naively, believed that if all Christians simply allowed God's will to be done, discord would vanish.

Winchester thus offered, "The divisions and animosities among Christians are great hindrances to the conversion of the world to Christianity, and until unity of spirit and harmony of sentiment take place in a much greater degree than at present, we cannot expect the knowledge of the Lord to fill the earth as the waters cover the sea."

=== Winchester's universal restoration ===
Winchester's universal restoration theology was essentially the result of biblical exegesis and can be summarized as.

- God is the only Creator.
- God is love.
- Christ died and atoned for all.
- God is unchanging.
- God's purpose is to gather all in Christ.

Winchester did not deny hell and its tormenting punishment. From Mark 9, 49, "For everyone shall be salted with fire.” Instead, he interpreted the purpose of the fire of hell to be that of preservation and purification and not punitive "Fire, as well as salt," Winchester noted, "is a great purifier, and preserves and cleanses those things that endure it."

For Winchester, who believed the earth was only 6,000 years old, a purifying fire of 50,000 or more years would be sufficient to prepare a soul for reunion with Christ. His notion of purification by fire, however, raised a critical question. If one is purified by fire, what role then do Christ's crucifixion and resurrection play in human salvation? Winchester's response seemed contrived. He offered that punishment destroys sin, humbles, and subdues the sinner, but it is actually the sacrificial blood of Jesus that saves souls.

Although Winchester's belief in universal restoration was based on scripture, some of his interpretation of specific text is suspect. His preaching and writing style relied on a volume of scriptural references that were collected like mosaic tiles in a larger artwork. No single tile conveyed a complete message, but the overall effect of the assembled scriptural text was an emotionally convincing argument that offered hope to those who wished for nothing more than eternal salvation in their afterlife.

=== Impact on American Universalism ===
Although Elhanan Winchester achieved considerable notoriety in life, his lasting impact on both the Baptist and Universalist denominations was minimal.

Baptists are not known for their belief in universalism. The teaching of universalism was eventually purged from mainstream Baptist theology.

Winchester's leadership role in late 18th-century American Universalism was due in part to the fact that he was present as the denomination first emerged from the Congregational and Baptist denominations. His evangelical and revivalist preaching style gave him a receptive audience when the outlines of universal salvation theology were still being defined. His contribution to Universalism was more in his spreading universal doctrine than in contributing to the theological foundation of the denomination. His teachings of purifying afterlife retribution for sin soon fell out of favor after his death. Hosea Ballou's ideas of a loving God who only intended to bring happiness and holiness to his creations became the center of Universalist theology.

However, the teaching of afterlife restoration did not wholly disappear from universal salvation teachings. Early Universalists lacked a central theological institution, such as Harvard, available to Unitarians. Consequently, many Universalist preachers were self-taught or self-identified, typically ordained by state conventions that remained largely loosely affiliated to a larger Universalist denomination. In 1803 the Universalist General Convention only reluctantly adopted the broadly worded Winchester Profession to fulfill state requirements regarding their churches' legal status. To be a Universalist, it was enough to believe in an all-powerful and all-loving God who could and would save all of humankind. How that salvation of humankind was achieved was open to interpretation.

Despite notoriety in life, after his death, Elhanan Winchester became a forgotten leader of American Universalism.
