= Olympia Brown =

American suffragist and Universalist minister

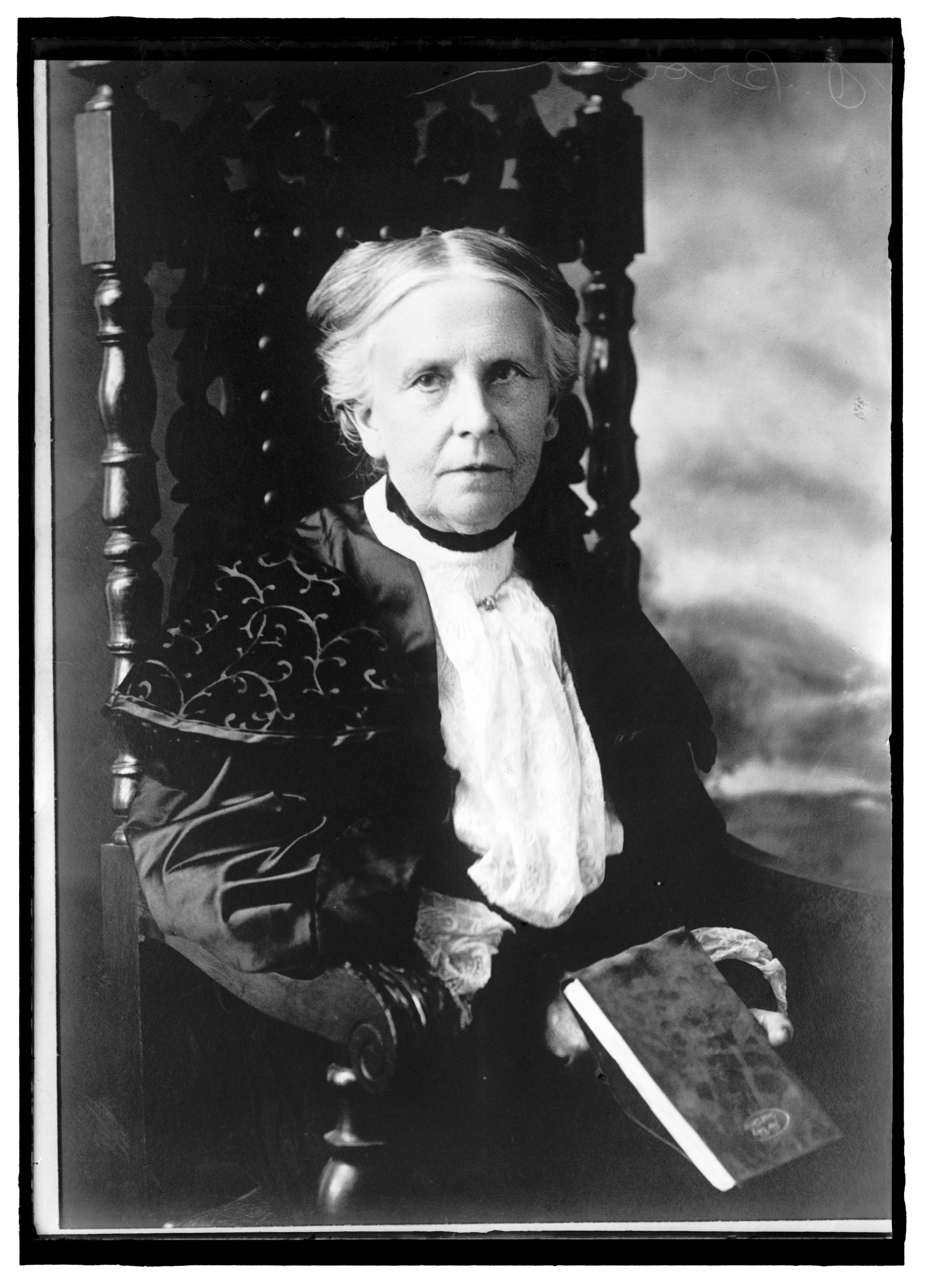
- Brown in 1919
- Born: January 5, 1835; Prairie Ronde Township, Michigan, US
- Died: October 23, 1926 (aged 91); Baltimore, Maryland, US
- Spouse: John Henry Willis
- Children: 2

Olympia Brown (January 5, 1835 – October 23, 1926) was an American minister and suffragist. She was the first woman to be ordained as clergy with the consent of her denomination. Brown was also an articulate advocate for women's rights and one of the few first generation suffragists who were able to vote with the passage of the Nineteenth Amendment.

== Early life and education ==
Olympia Brown was born on January 5, 1835, in Prairie Ronde Township, Michigan. Brown was the oldest of four children. Her parents, Lephia and Asa Brown, were farmers in what was then considered frontier land. They were the great-great-aunt and -uncle, respectively, of U.S. President Calvin Coolidge. Lephia raised her children in a household that regarded religion and education as very important. This is evident from the building of a schoolhouse on the Brown territory.

The drive for education instilled by Brown's mother had compelled her to finish high school and advance to the university level. Brown and her younger sister Oella decided to attend Mount Holyoke Female Seminary. Mount Holyoke and a college education were what Brown had hoped for. Her excitement was tempered by the restrictions placed on women at Mount Holyoke. These restrictions included a list of forty rules, the abolition of a literacy society founded by the Browns, and religious restrictions. Perhaps the best example of the school's thinking was the words of a Chemistry professor, "You are not expected to remember all of this, but only enough to make you intelligent in conversation." Brown, who already knew she could meet the challenges of a higher education, looked elsewhere.

Putting aside her experiences at Mount Holyoke, Brown enrolled at Antioch College. Once Brown began her education at Antioch, she realized she had to catch up to higher standards. Brown also learned that despite the progressive nature at Antioch, there were still forms of discrimination. For example, in Brown's English class, women were not required to have speeches memorized. In a defiant act, Brown delivered her speeches from memory, just as the men had. Perhaps the crowning achievement of Brown’s time at Antioch was her ability to persuade her hero, Antoinette Brown Blackwell, to speak at Antioch.

Once Brown finished her schooling at Antioch, she decided her calling was to be a minister. After countless rejections, she was accepted to the Theological School of St. Lawrence University, although the school's president, Ebenezer Fisher, made it clear he did not believe women should be ministers. She arrived on campus in 1861 and graduated in 1863, becoming the first woman to graduate from an established theological school. Once again, Brown faced opposition from many sides. This included fellow students and the wives of the faculty. Brown took it all as a challenge. After her first year, Brown had gained acceptance and finished her schooling.

== Career ==
=== Ordination and parish ministry ===
Despite finishing her schooling, and gaining a year of preaching experience with Congregations in Marshfield and Montpelier, Vermont, Brown still met opposition to her ordination. The St. Lawrence faculty refused to ordain her. Brown decided to appeal to the Universalist Council, and traveled to nearby Malone, New York, to present her case to the Northern Universalist Association. Brown's appeal was a simple plea for equality. One member of the Council had heard Brown's sermon the week prior, and left his support. To the surprise of many, the council voted to ordain her. Thus on June 25, 1863, Olympia Brown became the first woman to be ordained as a minister in the Universalist Church. Historians have debated the place she holds in the history of women's ordination. Some consider her ordination, approved by her regional Association, to be of greater significance than that of Antoinette Brown Blackwell, ordained in 1853 by the Congregational Church in South Butler, New York. Brown Blackwell did not have formal support in her denomination beyond the local congregation. Olympia Brown was the first woman to be ordained with official approval from a national denomination.

After her ordination, Brown went to Vermont, preaching in various churches. She also spent some time at home with her family in Michigan, before beginning her first pastorate in Weymouth Landing, Massachusetts. She was formally installed in July 1864, and ministered to the congregation for several years. She went on to pastor a church in Bridgeport, Connecticut, being hired by the congregation despite initial reluctance by many parishioners who did not wish to have a woman pastor. In 1878, she accepted a call to a church in Racine, Wisconsin, where she would serve as minister until 1887. In all her ministerial settings she was well respected as a preacher. She was described by a reporter for the Superior Daily Leader as "the female Beecher of the rostrum." This was intended as a high compliment, as Henry Ward Beecher was widely considered to be the best preacher in the United States at the time.

=== Women's suffrage ===
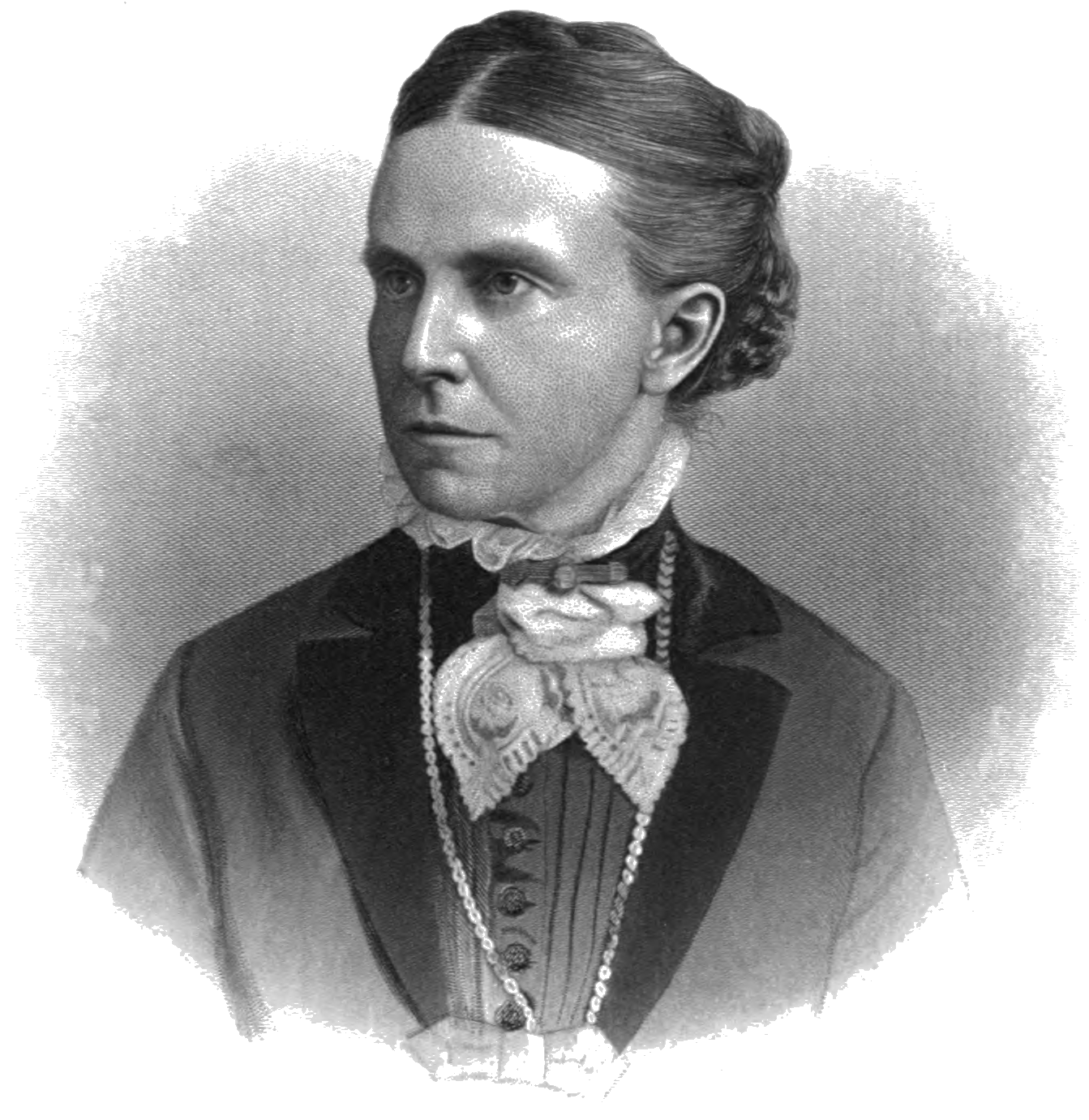
Brown c. 1887

From Brown's childhood and the abolition movement to Brown's own experiences with discrimination, Brown had always been aware of the quest for equal rights. Due to Brown's strong speaking skills and beliefs, Susan B. Anthony continually sought the involvement of Brown. With the encouragement of Lucy Stone and her husband, Henry Blackwell, Brown decided to travel to Kansas in order to speak on women's rights. Over the course of the summer, Brown delivered more than 300 speeches despite facing many hardships. Even though this was a great experience, Brown decided to return to ministry, until a change of heart in 1887.

Now that Brown had dedicated her life to the movement, she looked to do all she could. This included forming the New England Women's Suffrage Association, leading the Wisconsin Suffrage Association and becoming the president of the Federal Suffrage Association from 1903 to 1920.

Despite all this action, Brown saw few changes take place. Brown believed that the second generation of suffragists suffered from poor leadership and erroneously focused their efforts at the state level. It was not until 1913 when Brown was invited to join the newly formed Congressional Union for Woman Suffrage, which would later be called the National Woman's Party, by Alice Paul and Lucy Burns. This group looked to pass an amendment at the federal level and also vowed to use a more radical approach.

These new tactics led to the women's right to vote amendment being presented to Congress and marches in front of the White House. President Wilson met the two marches in front of the White House with displeasure. As a result, these women were to be jailed. The mistreatment of these women coupled with the massive press exposure led to more support for the movement.

Eventually, Congress passed the bill. However, with ratification still needed, Brown along with others hit the campaign trail one last time. Olympia Brown's last march was at the 1920 Republican National Convention. The 19th Amendment would finally be ratified on August 25, 1920, marking the first time that Olympia Brown along with countless other women were able to vote.

== Personal life ==
Brown was married to John Henry Willis in 1873; she chose to keep her maiden name. They reared two children: Henry and Gwendolyn. Both of their children became teachers.

Brown spent her last years with her family in Racine, Wisconsin. She continued to support women's rights and the Women's International League for Peace and Freedom.

== Death and legacy ==
She died in Baltimore on October 23, 1926.

In 1963 to honor the centennial of Brown's ordination, the Theological School of St. Lawrence University mounted a plaque at the church she pastored at in Racine, Wisconsin. The inscription concludes, "The flame of her spirit still burns today." In 1989 the church was renamed the Olympia Brown Unitarian Universalist Church.

In the 1970s the Olympia Brown League was founded by Susan Hester and Fran Kaplan to help women's name rights in Milwaukee, in response to a court decision against women seeking to keep their maiden names upon marriage; Brown had kept hers upon her marriage. Specifically, the case with that court decision was Kruzel v. Podell (1975), in which the Supreme Court of Wisconsin decided that a woman upon marriage adopts the last name of her husband by customarily using that name after marriage, but also stated that no law required her to.

An elementary school in Racine was named in Brown's honor in 1975.

In 1999 she was inducted into the Michigan Women's Hall of Fame.

Olympia Brown's own papers and documents relating to her work are held at the Schlesinger Library in Cambridge, Massachusetts, the State Historical Society of Wisconsin, and in the papers of the National Woman's Party at the Library of Congress.

The Olympia Brown mystery series of books is named after her.

== Selected works ==
- Woman's Suffrage (1907)
- Acquaintances, Old and New, Among Reformers (1911)
- Democratic Ideals: A Memorial Sketch of Clara B. Colby (1917)
- Suffrage and Religious Principle: Speeches and Writings of Olympia Brown (1988, posthumous)

== See also ==
- History of feminism
- List of peace activists
- List of suffragists and suffragettes
- List of women's rights activists
- Ordination of women
- Timeline of women's suffrage
- Women's suffrage organizations
