= Thomas Potter (Universalist) =

Universalist

Thomas Potter (1689 – sometime between 1777 and 1782) was an illiterate fisherman-farmer who in 1760 built a chapel in Good Luck, New Jersey (now Lacey Township), for the purpose of spreading the doctrine of Universalism. He is considered an important figure in the history of Universalism in America, and often seen as one of its founders.

Potter was born in 1689, the son of Rogerene Baptist immigrants from Rhode Island. Little is known of his ancestry other than that his father was a yeoman, who while he was known for his integrity, industry and thrift, did not see education as important and did not want to educate his children in reading and writing since he did not think it was "proper." Potter worked as a fisherman and farmer. He was deeply religious but since he was illiterate, he had people read the Bible to him. According to Clinton Lee Scott, in listening to the Bible being read, "he had been convinced that its message was of the final victory of good over all other forces, and that the process of salvation would claim all mankind." Influenced by both Quaker and Baptist beliefs, Potter, as a Universalist, let people of all creeds worship on his land but would not see it to any single denomination, but was convinced that God would send him a preacher of Universalism. He built a meetinghouse in the expectation that God would send a Universalist preacher to preach there.

In 1770, a ship carrying Universalist preacher named John Murray ran aground in New Jersey, where Potter assisted him, and finding out that he was a Universalist, asked him to give his first Universalist sermon on the American continent. When Murray arrived Potter told him he had been waiting for him for a long time. He recounted hearing a voice say to him "There in that vessel, cast away on the shore, is the preacher you have long been expecting." Murray preached his first sermon in America in Potter's chapel on September 30th, 1770, where he declared that his intention in coming to America had been to withdraw from the world, but that Potter had convinced in that his mission was to spread the Universalist faith across the country as a missionary and pastor. Murray went on to become the minister of the first Universalist congregation in America, located in Gloucester, Massachusetts, and to be a central figure in the creation of the Universalist Church in America, in 1793.

Potter is considered to have been one of the founders of the Universalist movement. Universalists began coming on pilgrimage to the site of his chapel, where in 1866 the Murray Grove Association was founded which built the Potter Memorial Chapel, dedicated in 1885, and created Murray Grove as a center of Universalism in America. Today Murray Grove is still a Unitarian Universalist retreat and conference center, celebrating the heritage of Potter, Murray and the early Universalists.

Author Frederick Adelbert Bisbee, who wrote a book covering some of the early Universalist history in America, considered Potter to be a mystic.

Potter died sometime between 11 May 1777, when he wrote his will, and 2 May 1782, when it was probated. Potter is buried at Murray Grove.
