= Clarence Skinner (minister) =

American minister, teacher, and university dean

Clarence Russell Skinner (1881–1949) was a Universalist minister, teacher, and dean of the Crane School of Theology at Tufts University.

Born on March 23, 1881, in Brooklyn, New York, he graduated from St. Lawrence University in 1904 with a BA and was ordained in 1906. He served as minister at the Universalist Church in Mont Vernon, New York from 1906 to 1911, Grace Universalist Church in Lowell, Massachusetts, from 1911 to 1914, and the First Universalist Church of Medford, Massachusetts, from 1917 to 1920. Clarence Skinner was on faculty at Crane Theological School, Tufts University as Professor of Applied Christianity from 1914 to 1933, and served as dean from 1933 to 1945. He wrote several books that had a substantial influence on Universalism in America in the twentieth century: The Social Implication of Universalism in 1915, A Religion for Greatness in 1945, and, posthumously, Worship and a Well Ordered Life published in 1959. The Unitarian Universalist Association's Skinner House Books imprint is named after him. Clarence Skinner died in 1949.
