= Mary Agnes Hathaway =

American missionary teacher

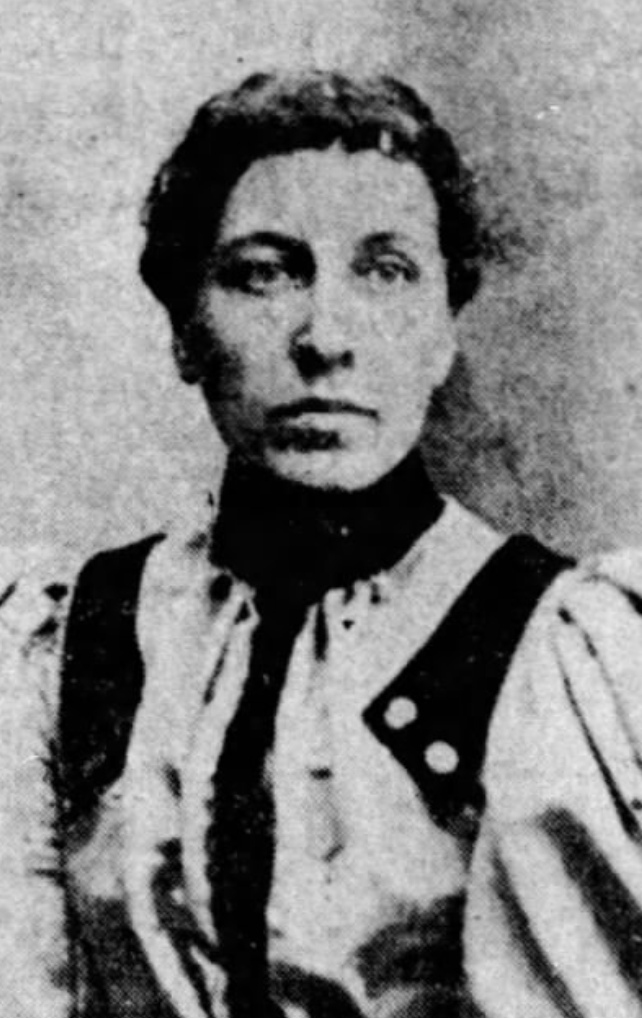
- Hathaway, from a 1905 newspaper
- Born: December 2, 1863; Bristol, New York, U.S.
- Died: March 13, 1939 (aged 75); Tokyo, Japan
- Occupations: Educator, missionary

Mary Agnes Hathaway (December 2, 1863 – March 13, 1939) was an American educator and a missionary teacher in Japan beginning in 1905.

== Early life and education ==
Hathaway was born in Bristol, New York, the daughter of Abiel Chandler Hathaway and Hannah Augusta Cornell Hathaway. She graduated from Genesee Wesleyan Seminary in 1888. She attended classes at Lebanon Normal School, but did not finish the course. She completed a degree at the University of Chicago in 1902.

== Career ==
After college, Hathaway taught school in Lima, New York, Newark, New York, and Chester, Illinois. She was Dean of Women at Lombard College from 1900 to 1903. She was an American missionary teacher based in Tokyo beginning in 1905, under the auspices of the Women's Missionary Association of the Universalist Church of America. She and Catherine M. Osborn ran the Blackmer Home for Girls, a Universalist residence for female college students in Tokyo. She spent Christmas 1908 in Shizuoka with Osborn.

Hathaway was in Tokyo for the Great Kantō Earthquake in 1923. "We had a letter from Miss Hathaway today in which she states that she was pretty badly shaken up nervously and was in constant fear of further damage from the continuous shakes which had not stopped when she wrote Monday," reported a fellow missionary soon afterward.

During furloughs in 1910 and 1911 and from 1925 to 1927, Hathaway spoke about her work to church groups and other audiences. In 1927, Hathaway was the guest preacher at the First Unitarian Church in Providence, Rhode Island. Her successor as director of the Blackmer Home was Georgene E. Bowen.

== Publications ==
- The Blackmer House Girls (1927)

== Personal life ==
Hathaway retired to a cottage in Zushi, Kanagawa, where her former colleague Tomo Murai and his family looked after her. She died in March 1939, at the age of 75, in Tokyo.
