= Theological School of St. Lawrence University =

Coordinates: 44°35′34″N 75°9′37″W

- Type: Seminary
- Active: 1856–1965
- Affiliations: Universalist
- Location: Canton, New York

The Theological School of St. Lawrence University was founded in 1856 at St. Lawrence University. In 1858, there were four students. It closed in 1965, with the consolidation of the Universalist Church of America and the American Unitarian Association into the Unitarian Universalist Association.

It was one of the three Universalist seminaries along with Crane Divinity School and Ryder Divinity School.

== Notable people ==
=== Alumni ===
- Olympia Brown, 1863, first woman in America to receive ordination with full denominational authority.
- Florence E. Kollock (1848-1925), Universalist minister and lecturer

=== Leaders ===
- 1856–1879: Ebenezer Fisher (president)
- 1879–1898: Isaac Morgan Atwood (president)
- 1899–1913: Henry Prentiss Forbes (dean)
- 1914–1951: John Murray Atwood (dean)
- 1951–1960: Angus Hector MacLean (dean)
- 1960–1965: Max Kapp (dean)

== See also ==
- List of defunct colleges and universities in New York
