= "Irish" Teddy Mann =

American boxer (1951–2024)

Teddy Mann
Personal information
- Nationality: American
- Born: Theodore A. Mannschreck; September 5, 1951 (age 74) Point Pleasant, New Jersey, U.S.
- Died: December 10, 2024 U.S.
- Height: 5 ft 10 in (178 cm)
- Weight: Middleweight

Boxing career
- Stance: Orthodox

Boxing record
- Total fights: 42
- Wins: 27
- Win by KO: 14
- Losses: 15
- Draws: 0

"Irish" Teddy Mann (born September 5, 1951 - December 10, 2024) was the professional nickname of former world-rated middleweight boxing pro Theodore A. Mannschreck, also known as Ted "The Irish" Man.

Born in Point Pleasant, New Jersey, he moved to the Forked River section of Lacey Township, New Jersey while very young, and it was there that he first developed his lifelong love for the sport of boxing. And first trainer was Walter Marler in Point Pleasant NJ.

As an amateur, Ted amassed an impressive record and fought some tough competitors including A.A.U. Champion, Curtis Parker and several golden gloves champs. While attending Central Regional High School, in Forked River, he broke more than one track and cross county school record and was captain of the cross country team.

After turning pro on August 24, 1977, Mannschreck shortened his name to "Mann" at the suggestion of his manager, Carmen Graziano. Early on in his career his prospects looked very promising and going into his contest with "Bad" Bennie Briscoe, in 1979, at the Philadelphia Spectrum, he had garnered a record of 18–1. That fight proved to be the turning point of his career as it resulted in Mann sustaining an injury to his right hand from which he never fully recovered.

Several years later, he managed to defeat world-rated contender, Robbie Epps to earn a ranking of seventh in the world from Ring Magazine and eighth in the world, from the WBA.

Teddy died on December 10, 2024.
