= Lacey Township School District =

School district in Ocean County, New Jersey, US

Address
- 200 Western Boulevard Lanoka Harbor, Ocean County, New Jersey, 08734
- Coordinates: 39.868042°N 74.197226°W

District information
- Grades: K-12
- Superintendent: William Zylinski
- Business administrator: Constance Stewart, Interim
- Schools: 6 (1 preschool, 3 elementary [K-5], 1 middle school [6-8], 1 high school [9-12])

Students and staff
- Enrollment: 3,864 (as of 2021–22)
- Faculty: 224.0 FTEs (as of 2025)
- Student–teacher ratio: 37:1 (as of 2025)

Other information
- District Factor Group: DE
- Website: www.laceyschools.org
Ind.	Per pupil	District spending	Rank (*)	K-12 average	%± vs. average
1A	Total Spending	$17,210	31	$18,891	−8.9%
1	Budgetary Cost	12,955	22	14,783	−12.4%
2	Classroom Instruction	8,112	24	8,763	−7.4%
6	Support Services	1,857	23	2,392	−22.4%
8	Administrative Cost	861	1	1,485	−42.0%
10	Operations & Maintenance	1,612	52	1,783	−9.6%
13	Extracurricular Activities	394	97	268	47.0%
16	Median Teacher Salary	57,348	13	64,043
Data from NJDoE 2025 Taxpayers' Guide to Education Spending. *Of K-12 districts with {{{enrollrange}}} students. Lowest spending=1; Highest=103

The Lacey Township School District is a comprehensive community public school district serving students in kindergarten through twelfth grade from Lacey Township, in Ocean County, in the U.S. state of New Jersey, located in South Jersey along the state's Jersey Shore.

As of the 2021–22 school year, the district, comprising six schools, had an enrollment of 3,864 students and 334.0 classroom teachers (on an FTE basis), for a student–teacher ratio of 11.6:1.

The district is classified by the New Jersey Department of Education as being in District Factor Group "DE", the fifth-highest of eight groupings. District Factor Groups organize districts statewide to allow comparison by common socioeconomic characteristics of the local districts. From lowest socioeconomic status to highest, the categories are A, B, CD, DE, FG, GH, I and J.

The school district includes six schools. Cedar Creek School (CCS), Lanoka Harbor School (LHS) and Forked River School (FRS) serve grades 1-5. Mill Pond serves grades Preschool-K. Lacey Township Middle School (LTMS) is an intermediate school for grades 6-8 and is located behind the high school. Lacey Township High School (LTHS) has served grades 9-12 since its creation in 1981.

== Schools ==
Schools in the district (with 2021–22 enrollment data from the National Center for Education Statistics) are:

Elementary schools

- Mill Pond Elementary School with 635 students in grades 5-6 (now PreK-K)
  - Joanie Donohue, principal
- Cedar Creek Elementary School with 437 students in grades K-4 (now 1-5)
  - Holly Neimiec, principal
- Forked River Elementary School with 465 students in grades K-4 (now 1-5)
  - Eric P. Fiedler, principal
- Lanoka Harbor Elementary School with 449 students in grades K-4 (now 1-5)
  - Jeffrey Brewer, principal

Middle school

- Lacey Township Middle School with 608 students in grades 7-8 (now 6-8)
  - Gregory Brandis, principal

High school

- Lacey Township High School with 1,256 students in grades 9-12. Its symbol is a lion's paw, for the "Lacey Lions."
  - Jason King, principal

After a reconfiguration of schools implemented for the 2022-23 school year, Mill Pond serves students in PreK and Kindergarten, the three elementary schools (Cedar Creek, Forked River and Lanoka Harbor) serve 1-5 and Lacey Township Middle School serves grades six through eight.

== Administration ==
Core members of the district's administration are:

- William Zylinski, superintendent
- Sharon Ormsbee, business administrator and board secretary

== Board of education ==
The district's board of education, comprised of nine members, sets policy and oversees the fiscal and educational operation of the district through its administration. As a Type II school district, the board's trustees are elected directly by voters to serve three-year terms of office on a staggered basis, with three seats up for election each year held (since 2012) as part of the November general election. The board appoints a superintendent to oversee the district's day-to-day operations and a business administrator to supervise the business functions of the district.
