= Crane Theological School =

Universalist seminary in Massachusetts, US

Coordinates: 42.406949°N 71.11982°W

- Former names: Tufts College Divinity School, Tufts College School of Religion
- Type: seminary
- Active: 1869–1968
- Affiliations: Universalist
- Location: Medford, Massachusetts

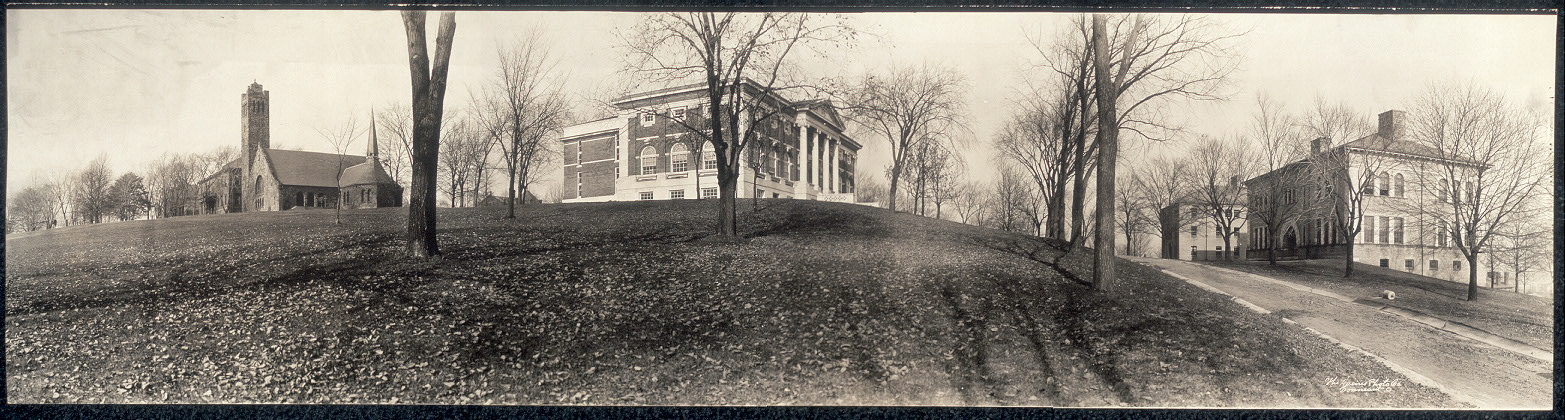
Tufts in 1910, with Goddard Chapel visible at left, and Miner Hall at right

The Crane Theological School was a Universalist seminary at Tufts University founded in 1869 as the Tufts College Divinity School and closed in 1968. It was one of three Universalist seminaries founded in America during the nineteenth century, along with the Theological School of St. Lawrence University and the Ryder Divinity School at Lombard College. During its history, it granted 281 Bachelor of Divinity degrees (some in religious education), 152 Bachelor of Sacred Theology degrees, and two Masters of Religious Education, for a total of 435 degrees.

The name changed multiple times. Founded as "Tufts College Divinity School", it became "Crane Theological School" in 1906 upon Albert Crane's gift of $100,000 in 1906 in honor of his father, Thomas. In 1925, the school became officially the "Tufts College School of Religion - Crane Theological School," after extensive discussions, including a conference with the widow of Albert Crane. By the 1960s, the name had shortened again to "Crane Theological School". The Crane Chapel remains part of the Tufts campus as the Crane Room.

The school was one of the Associated Schools of the Faculty of Arts and Sciences from 1903–1962 and 1965–1968. The school was never officially denominationally controlled, nor was it accredited by the American Association of Theological Schools.

== History ==
=== Founding – World War I ===
Crane Chapel while still in Miner Hall, prior to the 1929 addition to the Crane Building

Universalist layman and major Tufts supporter Silvanus Packard founded the school with a bequest in 1869.

The divinity school was initially housed on the second floor of Ballou Hall. With the construction of West Hall in 1872, divinity students were offered accommodation there. In 1891, students saw the building of separate quarters for the school with the construction of Miner and Paige Halls. Miner Hall provided classroom and office space for the school, while Paige Hall served as a dormitory and chapel.

Miner Hall was constructed in 1891 to serve as headquarters for the School of Theology and was named for Alonzo A. Miner, second president of Tufts College and the major donor to the project ($40,000). Paige Hall was built in 1892 to serve as a dormitory for Theological School Students and bears the name of Lucius R. Paige, Universalist minister and trustee 1859–1896.

In 1902, the school began to offer a combined 5-year A.B./S.T.B.

Between 1910 and 1915, both Miner and Paige halls became home to the newly established Jackson College for Women, until women were integrated into the rest of Tufts in 1915 and the facilities were returned to the Crane School.

Paige Hall (at left) and Miner Hall prior to construction of the Crane Chapel and arcade between the two buildings

During World War I, the school's buildings were taken for use as barracks and training facilities and Dean McCollester held classes for the handful of students enrolled in his living room for the duration of hostilities.

In 1929, architects George, Lloyd and Ruffing designed Crane Chapel as an addition to Paige Hall along with the two-level Fischer arcade connecting it to Miner Hall. Designed as an adaptation of a chapel in Oxford, England, the oak paneling was brought from Warwick Forest in England.

=== Postwar ===
By 1945, the school had almost no endowment and faculty. After the 1951 destruction by fire of Fisher Hall, the main building of the Universalist St. Lawrence Theological School, Ratcliff favored merging the two schools, an offer which St. Lawrence rejected. The next year included a fundraising drive by Tufts, although it ignored the school itself. The school then launched into its own fundraising program, although this was unsuccessful.

=== Closing ===
In 1953, when Dean Ratcliff died unexpectedly, Eugene Ashton, a Congregational minister and assistant chaplain of Tufts, was appointed to replace him until a successor could be found. Shortly before his successor's appointment in 1954, Ashton released a report on the school arguing that it was "not in a particularly healthy state". He observed that of 151 men enrolled between 1947 and 1952, 80 were non-graduates; of the 33 women who attended during the same period, 14 were non-graduates.

The American Unitarian Association (AUA) Board of Trustees in 1959 appointed a commission to study theological education in anticipation of merger with the Universalists. In 1962, the report advocated the merger of St. Lawrence and Crane, and the 1964 General Assembly debated a resolution that advocated a merger with Star King or Meadville, however neither attempt was successful. The lack of funds to continue operation was the main reason for closing Crane. The school operated with a deficit for a number of years—in 1964 half of the $90,000 (~$713,034 in 2025) Crane budget required funding from Tufts general operating fund.

In 1962, Crane disassociated itself from the faculty of arts and sciences to report directly to the trustees. While the aim was to become a graduate school independent of a college, resources were inadequate for even a quasi-independent existence, and in 1965 the faculties recombined. The program would have included an undergraduate degree for admission called for elimination of the combined AB/STB program.

In 1967, the trustees finally reached the decision to close the school the following year. A number of factors contributed to the decision. The committee that recommended closure gave finances as the primary reason, estimating $250,000 per year was required to operate the school, with no funding prospects, as the Tufts operating deficit in 1967 was more than $500,000. However, the trustees' June 1967 recommendation for closure cited that the school had not "maintained its place of considerable distinction in theological education."

Tufts President Hallowell was given authority by a Massachusetts state court to dispose of school funds, and he created the Crane Program fund amounting to $213,000 (~$1.24 million in 2025) in 1972 to support Tufts's religion department and chaplaincy, as well as scholarships for students pursuing liberal ministry and social welfare work. The Crane Library Collection was always a part of the Tufts University Library and was now retained by the university library; the Universalist Historical Society Library which had been housed at Tufts was transferred to Harvard Divinity School in 1975. Source Russell Miller's History of Tufts, v. 2, page 66. "When the school closed, the collection was indeed broken up and much of it became part of the general library holdings."

== Deans ==
All of Crane's deans were Universalist clergy.

- 1869–1891, Thomas Jefferson Sawyer
- 1891–1910, Charles Hall Leonard (second dean)
- 1912–1933, Lee Sullivan McCollester
- 1933–1945, Clarence Skinner
- 1945–1953, John Moses Ratcliff
- 1953, Eugene S. Ashton (acting Dean after Ratcliff's unexpected death)
- 1953–1968, Benjamin Butler Hersey

== Enrollment ==
The graduating class of 1897, notable for the presence of three women among the graduates that year

Tufts records indicate that over the course of its ninety-nine year history, the Crane Theological School granted a total of 485 degrees, 50 more than appear in records of the Unitarian Universalist Association.

- 1869: 4 students
- 1871: 12 students
- 1892: 44 students
- 1906: 9 students
- 1910: 15 students
- 1912: 4 students
- 1923: 24 students
- 1928: 36 students
- 1937: 60 students
- 1955: 31 students
- 1957: 22 students
- 1959: 21 students
- 1960: 20 students
- 1968: 12 students

In the period between 1947 and 1952, 151 men were enrolled, on 71 of whom completed a degree. Similarly, 33 women were enrolled on 19 of whom completed a degree.
