= Lacey Township High School =

High school in Ocean County, New Jersey, US

Location
- 73 Haines Street; Lacey Township, Ocean County, New Jersey 08734; United States; 39.860554°N 74.191032°W

Information
- Type: Public high school
- Motto: "It's a Matter of Pride"
- Established: 1981
- School district: Lacey Township School District
- NCES School ID: 340810005935
- Principal: Jason King
- Faculty: 80.6 FTEs
- Grades: 9-12
- Enrollment: 1,119 (as of 2024–25)
- Student to teacher ratio: 13.9:1
- Colors: Navy blue Gray and Cardinal
- Athletics conference: Shore Conference
- Team name: Lions
- Rival: Central Regional High School; Toms River East High School
- Accreditation: Middle States Association of Colleges and Schools
- Newspaper: The Pride
- Website: lths.laceyschools.org

Lacey Township High School is a four-year comprehensive public high school serving students in ninth through twelfth grades, located in the Lanoka Harbor section of Lacey Township, in Ocean County, in the U.S. state of New Jersey, which operates as part of the Lacey Township School District.

The school is overseen by the New Jersey Department of Education and has been accredited by the Middle States Association of Colleges and Schools Commission on Elementary and Secondary Schools since 1983, with accreditation expiring in July 2027.

As of the 2024–25 school year, the school had an enrollment of 1,119 students and 80.6 classroom teachers (on an FTE basis), for a student–teacher ratio of 13.9:1. There were 270 students (24.1% of enrollment) eligible for free lunch and 75 (6.7% of students) eligible for reduced-cost lunch.

The school's mascot is a lion, the symbol is a paw, for the "Lacey Lions." The school's colors are navy blue, silver, and cardinal

Lacey Township High School has implemented a random drug testing policy. Students participating in any extracurricular activities including after school sports, clubs or any school event must sign a waiver that allows them to be drug tested randomly. The first offense includes suspension from all after school activities for 10 days.

== History ==
Organized efforts to establish a high school in the township go back to 1971, when a group of residents that included a Central Regional High School District board trustee created the Lacey Township High School Study Committee to consider the options available, based on advice from experts. By March 1976, the Lacey Township Taxpayers Association suggested consideration of a township school for grades 7 and 8 as the first step towards withdrawal of the 1,100 township students attending Central Regional.

Constructed at a cost of $9.5 million (equivalent to $33.6 million in 2025) and designed to handle a maximum enrollment of 1,200, the school opened its doors in September 1981 with 850 students in grades 9–12. Before the new facility opened, students from Lacey Township had attended Central Regional High School in neighboring Berkeley Township as part of a sending/receiving relationship.

A new west wing was added onto the school in 2003, which offers upgraded classrooms.

In 2018, the school was sued by the American Civil Liberties Union after suspending two students who had posted photos of themselves at a gun range, in their own free time and not on school property. One of the students, Cody Conroy, was vocal about the situation. "Sharing our completely legal weekend activities on Snapchat should not result in three days of in-school suspensions."

== Awards, recognition, and rankings ==
The school was the 210th-ranked public high school in New Jersey out of 339 schools statewide in New Jersey Monthly magazine's September 2014 cover story on the state's "Top Public High Schools," using a new ranking methodology. The school had been ranked 257th in the state of 328 schools in 2012, after being ranked 225th in 2010 out of 322 schools listed. The magazine ranked the school 238th in 2008 out of 316 schools. The school was ranked 201st in the magazine's September 2006 issue, which surveyed 316 schools across the state. Schooldigger.com ranked the school as tied for 211th out of 376 public high schools statewide in its 2010 rankings (an increase of one position from the 2009 rank) which were based on the combined percentage of students classified as proficient or above proficient on the language arts literacy and mathematics components of the High School Proficiency Assessment (HSPA).

Maurice Grillon III was recognized by Princeton University as one of four outstanding New Jersey secondary school teachers, honored at its June 1, 2004, commencement. Through Grillon's efforts, the school's German language program was expanded to 210 students.

Math teacher Mark Geiger was recognized in April 2011 as a recipient of the Presidential Award for Excellence in Mathematics and Science Teaching, in recognition of his efforts to identify "for new and innovative ways to teach mathematics in order to make it relevant and to connect to each of his students." In 2014, Mark Geiger was selected as the first American soccer referee to officiate in the FIFA World Cup since 2002.

== Advanced Placement courses ==
Lacey Township High School offers Advanced Placement (AP) courses to students including AP Biology, AP Calculus AB, AP Calculus BC, AP Chemistry, AP Computer Science A, AP English Language and Composition, AP English Literature and Composition, AP Environmental Science, AP French Language and Culture, AP German Language and Culture, AP Physics 1, AP Psychology, AP Spanish Language and Culture, AP Statistics, AP Studio Art, and AP United States History.

== Athletics ==
The Lacey Township High School Lions compete in Division B South of the Shore Conference, an athletic conference comprised of public and private high schools in Monmouth and Ocean counties along the Jersey Shore. The league operates under the jurisdiction of the New Jersey State Interscholastic Athletic Association (NJSIAA). With 876 students in grades 10–12, the school was classified by the NJSIAA for the 2019–20 school year as Group III for most athletic competition purposes, which included schools with an enrollment of 761 to 1,058 students in that grade range. The school was classified by the NJSIAA as Group III South for football for 2024–2026, which included schools with 695 to 882 students.

The school participates as the host school / lead agency in a joint ice hockey team with Barnegat High School. The co-op program operates under agreements scheduled to expire at the end of the 2023–24 school year.

Sports offered by the high school include:

Fall Sports	Winter Sports	Spring Sports
Boys Cross Country	Wrestling	Baseball
Girls Cross Country	Bowling	Golf
Field Hockey	Boys Basketball	Girls Lacrosse
Football	Girls Basketball	Softball
Girls Gymnastics	Boys Swimming	Boys Spring Track
Boys Soccer	Boys Winter Track	Girls Spring Track
Girls Soccer	Girls Winter Track	Boys Tennis
Girls Tennis	Girls Swimming	Boys Lacrosse
Girls Volleyball	Ice Hockey	Boys Volleyball

The football team won the South Jersey Group III state sectional titles in 1988, 1989, 2006 and 2010. The 1988 team finished the season with a 10–1 record after winning the South Jersey Group III sectional title with a 31–28 victory against Woodrow Wilson High School in the championship game on a field goal kicked with two seconds left in the game. The 1989 team finished with a record of 11–0 after defeating Woodrow Wilson in the finals by a score of 28–28 to win the team's second consecutive South Jersey Group III title. In 2006, the Lacey Lions beat Seneca High School 12-0 becoming the NJSIAA South Jersey Group III state champions. This is only the second time that the Lions went undefeated. It was the third state championship under Coach Lou Vircillo, the only head football coach the school has had since it opened in 1981. In 2010, the Lions football team reached the NJSIAA South Jersey Group III state championship game and defeated Delsea Regional High School 56–7, finishing a perfect 12–0 season, earning the fourth state championship under Coach Lou Vircillo, and marking the third team in school history to go undefeated. The Lions football team also reached the NJSIAA South Jersey Group III state championship game in both 2005 and 2007, but were defeated by Delsea Regional High School (by a score of 21–6) and Shawnee High School (losing 23–20), respectively.

The field hockey team won the South Jersey Group III state sectional title in 1993, 1994 and 1995. The 1994 team finished the season with an 18-2-3 record after winning the Group III state championship game by a score of 2–1 against a West Essex High School team led by Michelle Vizzuso that had not lost in 86 consecutive games in a four-year span.

The girls' bowling team won the Group II state championship in 2018.

== Administration ==
The school's principal is Jason King. His core administration team includes the two assistant principals.

== Notable alumni ==
- Melissa Drexler (born 1978), known as the "Prom Mom".
- Keith Elias (born 1972), former professional football player for the New York Giants and Indianapolis Colts.
- Chris Fleming (born 1970, class of 1988), basketball player who played at the University of Richmond before starring in Germany and becoming the head coach of Germany's men's national basketball team.
- Warren Smith (born 1990, class of 2008), American football player who played at Iona College and the University of Maine before playing in Germany, the Richmond Raiders, the Trenton Freedom and the Spokane Shock.
- Rhett Titus (born 1987, class of 2005), professional wrestler in Ring of Honor.
- Garry Tonon (born 1991), submission grappler and mixed martial artist.
