= John Murray (minister) =

American clergy (1741–1815)

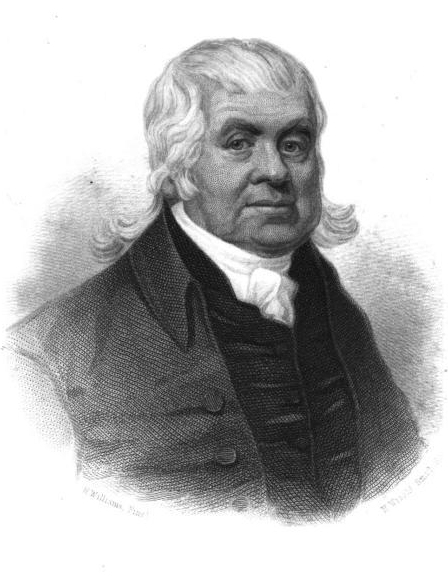
- John Murray
- Born: John Murray; December 10, 1741; Alton, Hampshire
- Died: September 3, 1815 (aged 73); Boston, Massachusetts
- Burial place: Mount Auburn Cemetery
- Occupation: Minister
- Known for: One of the founders of the Universalist Church of America
- Spouse: Judith Sargent Murray

John Murray (December 10, 1741 – September 3, 1815) was one of the founders of the Universalist denomination in the United States, a pioneer minister and an inspirational figure.

== Early life ==
He was born in Alton, Hampshire, about fifteen miles northeast of Winchester, in England on December 10, 1741. His father was an Anglican and his mother a Presbyterian, both strict Calvinists, and his home life was attended by religious severity. In 1751 the family settled near Cork, Ireland. In 1760, Murray returned to England and joined George Whitefield's congregation; but embracing, somewhat later, the Universalistic teachings of Welsh minister James Relly he was excommunicated. In 1770 he emigrated to "lose himself in America", and preached, as a Universalist minister, his first sermon in Good Luck, now Lacey Township, New Jersey, September 30, 1770, residing there with his patron and friend Thomas Potter until 1774, itinerating from Virginia to New Hampshire. Today the Potter farm is the site of the Murray Grove Retreat and Renewal Center.

== Mature life ==
Coat of Arms of John Murray

In 1774, he settled at Gloucester, Massachusetts and established a congregation there out of a Rellyite study group. There he met his second wife, the author and philosopher Judith Sargent Murray. He was suspected of being a British spy, but in 1775 was appointed chaplain of the Rhode Island Brigade before Boston by General George Washington despite petitions for his dismissal by other chaplains over his rejection of belief in hell. He participated in the first general Universalist Convention at Oxford, Massachusetts, September, 1785. On October 23, 1793, he became pastor of the Universalist society of Boston, and faithfully served it until October 19, 1809, when paralysis stopped his work. He was a man of great courage and eloquence, and in the defense of his views endured much detestation and abuse. In regard to Jesus, he taught that in him God became the Son; for "God the Father, God the Son, and God the Holy Ghost, are no more than different exhibitions of the self-same existent, omnipresent Being." He taught that all men would ultimately be saved through the sacrifice of Christ, the basis for this being the union of all men in Christ, just as they were united with Adam, and therefore partaking of the benefits of his sacrifice. He was also a writer of hymns and a compiler of hymnals.

Murray suffered a debilitating stroke on October 19, 1809, which compelled him to give up preaching, and he died in Boston, Massachusetts on September 3, 1815. His wife, Judith Sargent Murray, collected and finished his autobiography to publish posthumously. Murray is buried in Mount Auburn Cemetery in Cambridge and Watertown, MA.

== Writings ==
His letters are compiled in Letters and Sketches of Sermons, 3 volumes, Boston, 1812. At the time of his death he was writing his autobiography which was posthumously published as Autobiography, continued by his wife, (also known as Life of Murray), Boston, 1816, centenary ed., 1870.

Additional information and detailed writings from the letters of his wife Judith Sargent Murray were published in 1998 (edited by Bonnie Hurd Smith), in the book From Gloucester to Philadelphia in 1790: Observations, anecdotes and thoughts from the 18th century letters of Judith Sargent Murray. This publication describes the life of the Murray family as they traveled in 1790, with the majority of time in Philadelphia.

== Legacy ==
In 1875 a church was built in Attleboro, Massachusetts named after him. Services are still held, but it is now Unitarian Universalist.
