= James Relly =

James Relly (1721 or 1722 – 25 April 1778) was a Welshman, Methodist minister and mentor of John Murray who spread Universalism in the United States.

== Biography ==
Relly was born at Jeffreyston, Pembrokeshire, Wales. He attended the Pembroke Grammar School, came under the influence of George Whitefield, probably in the latter's first tour of Wales in 1741, and became one of his preachers. His first station was at Rhyddlangwraig near Narberth; and in 1747 he made a report of a missionary tour to Bristol, Bath, Gloucestershire, and Birmingham. He broke, however, with Whitefield on doctrinal grounds - his views on the certainty of salvation being regarded as antinomian - and is known to have been in controversy with John Wesley in 1756. In that year, at Carrickfergus, he delivered, in opposition to Wesley, a 'pointless harangue about hirelings and false prophets'. On 2 April 1761 Wesley writes of him and others as 'wretches' who 'call themselves Methodists' being really antinomian.

About the same time he adopted Universalism, which he viewed as a logical consequence of the universal efficacy of the death of Christ. He settled in London as a preacher at Coachmakers' Hall, Addle Street, Wood Street. In 1764 a chancery action was brought against him by a Yorkshire lady, who had given him a sum of money and executed a deed securing to him an annuity of £5. It was alleged that Relly had fraudulently obtained these benefits while the grantor was in a state of religious frenzy. Under an order of the court the deed was cancelled and the money refunded. Shortly afterwards Relly removed to a meeting-house in Bartholomew Close (formerly presbyterian), which had just been vacated by Wesley. Here he remained till midsummer 1769, when the lease expired. He then secured (October 1769) a meeting-house in Crosby Square (formerly presbyterian), where he continued to preach till his death, but his cause did not thrive, and he had no immediate successor in this country.

A portion from Charles Buck's Definition of All Theological Terms and Every Article in the System of Divinity, published about 1820, describes Relly and his theology this way:

He believed that Christ as Mediator was so united to mankind, that his actions were theirs, his obedience and sufferings theirs; and, consequently, that he has as fully restored the whole human race to the divine favour, as if all had obeyed and suffered in their own persons; and upon this persuasion he preached a finished salvation, called by the apostle Jude, "The common salvation." Many of his followers are removed to the world of spirits, but a branch still survives, and meets at the chapel in Windmill-street, Moorfields, London; where there are different brethren who speak. They are not observers of ordinances, such as water-baptism and the sacrament; professing to believe only in one baptism, which they call an immersion of the mind or conscience into truth by the teaching of the Spirit of God; and by the same Spirit they are enabled to feed on Christ as the bread of life, professing that in and with Jesus they possess all things. They inculcate and maintain good works for necessary purposes; but contend that the principal and only works which ought to be attended to, is the doing real good without religious ostentation; that to relieve the miseries and distresses of mankind according to our ability, is doing more real good than the superstitious observance of religious ceremonies. In general they appear to believe that there will be a resurrection to life, and a resurrection to condemnation; that believers only will be among the former, who as first fruits, and kings and priests, will have part in the first resurrection, and shall reign with Christ in his kingdom of the millennium; that unbelievers who are after raised, must wait the manifestation of the Saviour of the world, under that condemnation of conscience which a mind in darkness and wrath must necessarily feel; that believers, called kings and priests, will be made the medium of communication to their condemned brethren; and like Joseph to his brethren, though he spoke roughly to them, in reality overflowed with affection and tenderness; that ultimately every knee shall bow, and every tongue confess that in the Lord they have righteousness and strength; and thus every enemy shall be subdued to the kingdom and glory of the Great Mediator.

One of his converts in 1770 was John Murray, the founder of Universalist churches in America.

Relly is said to have shown much natural ability and a generous disposition, under a rough manner. He died in London, England on 25 April 1778 and was interred in the baptist burial ground, Maze Pond, Southwark; the inscription on his tombstone represents him as 'aged 56 years'. Two elegies were written by admirers. He left a widow and one daughter, who was living in 1808 and had issue. John Relly Beard was named after him, but was not a descendant. Relly's portrait was twice engraved.

== Publications ==
His chief publications, besides single sermons, were:

- Remarks on a pamphlet, intitled, A dialogue between a true Methodist and an erroneous Methodist, (1751), author given as "Philadelphus"
- Salvation Compleated: and Secured in Christ, as the Covenant of the People, (1753)
- The Tryal of Spirits, or A Treatise Upon the Nature, Office, and Operations of the Spirit of Truth (London, 1756, 2nd ed. 1762)
- Union; or a Treatise of the Consanguinity between Christ and His Church (1759)
- The Sadducee Detected and Refuted, in Remarks on the Works of Richard Coppin (1754, 1764)
- The Life of Christ: The Perseverance of the Christian (1762)
- Anti-Christ resisted (1761)
- The Salt of the Sacrifice; or, The True Christian Baptism Delineated {1762}
- An Elegy on ... Whitefield (1770)
- Epistles: or, The Great Salvation Contemplated (1776)
- Thoughts on the Cherubimical Mystery; Or an Attempt to Prove, That the Cherubims, Were Emblems of Salvation (1780)

In conjunction with his brother John, he published a volume of original Christian Hymns, Poems, and Spiritual Songs (1758). He edited also a collection of hymns, (1792), and left manuscripts enumerated by Wilson, including a drama, Prince Llewellyn.

== Bibliography ==
- Walter Wilson. History and Antiquities of Dissenting Churches in London, i. 358-359, iii. 184. 385, 4 vols., London, 1808–14;
- L. Tyerman. Life and Times of John Wesley, i. 536-537. ii. 240, 400, London, 1870–71;
- Richard Eddy, in American Church History Series, x. 348, 392, 473. New York, 1894;
- DNB, xlviii. 7-8.
