= Lanoka Harbor, New Jersey =

Place in Ocean County, New Jersey, United States

- Unincorporated community
- Lanoka Harbor's location in Ocean County (Inset: Ocean County in New Jersey) Lanoka Harbor, New Jersey (New Jersey) Lanoka Harbor, New Jersey (the United States)
- Coordinates: 39°52′00″N 74°10′05″W
- Country: United States
- State: New Jersey
- County: Ocean
- Township: Lacey
- Elevation: 10 ft (3.0 m)

Population (2000)
  - Total: 8,734
- Time zone: UTC-5 (Eastern (EST))
  - Summer (DST): UTC-4 (Eastern (EDT))
- ZIP codes: 08734

Lanoka Harbor is an unincorporated community located within Lacey Township, in Ocean County, in the U.S. state of New Jersey.

Lanoka Harbor and Murray Grove were established in the mid-18th century and are representative of the typical bay town, often referred to as the "Barnegat Bay resorts." The communities fronting the bay relied on the products of forest trade and sea, including a substantial oyster industry, long before the railroad brought resort trade.

Murray Grove, located in Lanoka Harbor, is further renowned as the "birthplace of Universalism in America," where the first Universalist sermon in the United States was preached. The Unitarian influence remained in the community, with the establishment of the Murray Grove Universalist and Unitarian Retreat and Conference Center in the early 1800s.

The community of Lanoka Harbor was named after the abundance of oak trees located along George Lane; with the original name being "Lanes Oaks", which was eventually shortened to "Lanoka". In 1924, Samuel Rogers added "Harbor" in an attempt to attract tourism to the shore community.

Lanoka Harbor, and all of Lacey Township, is served by the Lacey Township School District; which includes Lacey Township High School, Lanoka Harbor Elementary School, Mill Pond Elementary School, and Cedar Creek Elementary School.

Lanoka Harbor receives emergency services from Lanoka Harbor EMS (Squad 26), Lanoka Harbor Fire Company (Station 61), Lacey Township Underwater Rescue and Recovery (Squad 47) and the Lacey Township Police Department.
