= George de Benneville =

George de Benneville (London, July 25, 1703 – Pennsylvania, March 19, 1793) was a physician and Christian Universalist preacher.

== Formative years ==
Born in London on July 25, 1703, to aristocratic Huguenot French parents in the court of Queen Anne, de Benneville served as a sailor during his adolescent years, traveling around the world and began to question his religion and compare it to other world religions. He shed his Huguenot religion, developed his own ideas about Christianity, and became a preacher while still in his teens.

== Religious life ==
Coat of Arms of George de Benneville

De Benneville had a mystical experience and later a near death experience that he described in The Life and Trance of Dr. George De Benneville. These experiences convinced him that Hell was for purification, not punishment, and that, ultimately, all souls would be united with God.

He believed that God is absolutely good and loving and would never condemn any human to eternal damnation. He also believed that each human being has a dualistic nature, and that the outer, flesh-and-blood person, subject to the evils of the world, could choose to do good or to do wrong, while the inner, spirit-like person, crafted by God and perfect, immaculate and holy, could never be damned. As a result, he was convinced that all human beings experienced salvation.

He preached and practiced medicine in France and Germany, but as religious authorities across Europe grew more and more disturbed by the increasing visibility of evangelists, de Benneville and others were sentenced to death more than once. After completing medical training in Europe, he chose to emigrate, and arrived in the American colonies during the mid-eighteenth century with others seeking religious tolerance.

After settling in Pennsylvania, he worked as a physician and apothecary in Oley, Berks County, using his free time to continue his Universalist preaching.

de Benneville also socialized and traded herbal preparations with Native American groups in the area. His beliefs stressed that all people everywhere were loved by God, and that cultures, races, and genders had no bearing on the worth of a human being. He also believed that the physical body was merely one part of a person.

== Death ==
de Benneville died at his home in Pennsylvania on March 19, 1793.

== Selected References ==
- Bell, Albert (1953). The Life and Times of Dr. George de Benneville. Boston.
- Howe, Charles (1993). The Larger Faith - A Short History of American Universalism. Boston.
- Scott, Clinton Lee (1957). The Universalist Church in America: A Short History. Boston.
- Vincent, K. R. (2003). "The near-death experience and Christian Universalism". Journal of Near-Death Studies. 22: 57–71.
