= Lacey Township, New Jersey =

Township in Ocean County, New Jersey, US

- Township
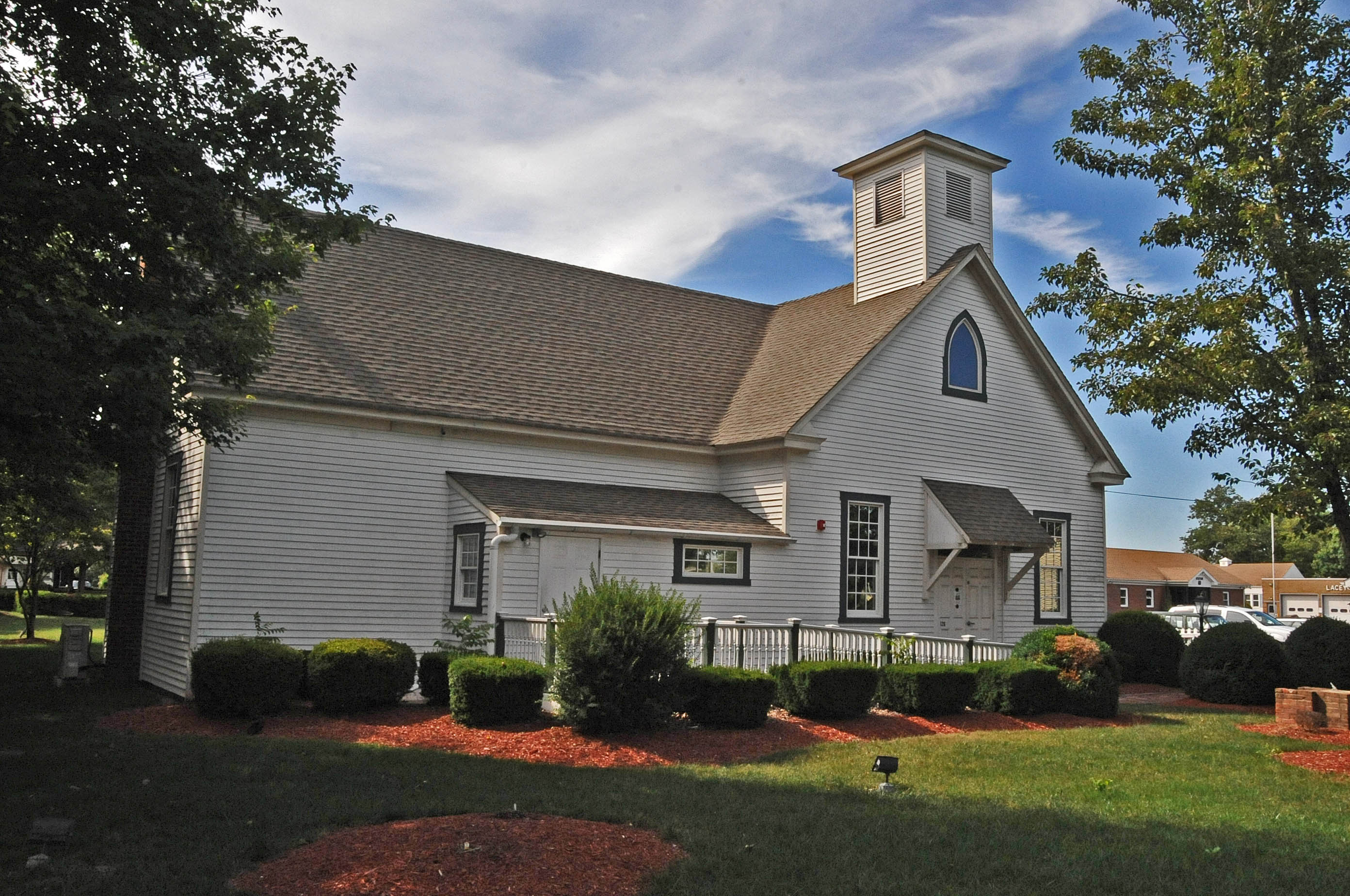
- Lacey Schoolhouse Museum

- Seal

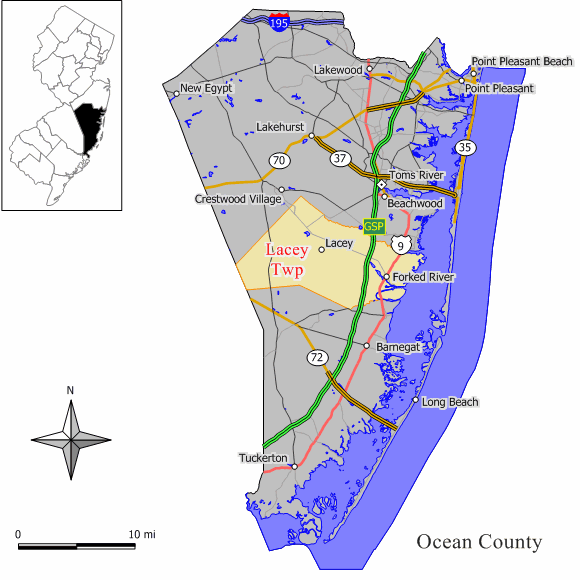
- Location of Lacey Township in Ocean County highlighted in yellow (right). Inset map: Location of Ocean County in New Jersey highlighted in black (left).

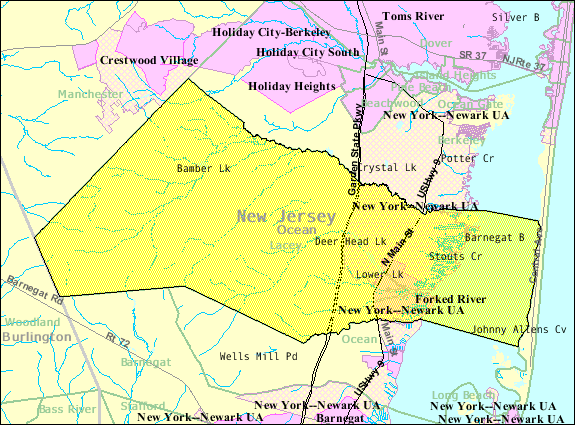
- Census Bureau map of Lacey Township, New Jersey

- Location in Ocean County Location in New Jersey Location in the United States
- Coordinates: 39.855153°N 74.267152°W
- Country: United States
- state: New Jersey
- County: Ocean
- Incorporated: March 23, 1871
- Named for: John Lacey

Government
  - Type: Township
  - Body: Township Committee
  - Mayor: Peggy Sue Juliano (R, term ends December 31, 2024)
  - Administrator: Veronica Laureigh
  - Municipal clerk: Amy McGuckin

Area
  - Total: 99.80 sq mi (258.49 km^{2})
  - Land: 83.25 sq mi (215.62 km^{2})
  - Water: 16.55 sq mi (42.87 km^{2}) 16.58%
  - Rank: 5th of 565 in state 2nd of 33 in county
- Elevation: 72 ft (22 m)

Population (2020)
  - Total: 28,655
  - Estimate (2024): 30,041
  - Rank: 85th of 565 in state 7th of 33 in county
  - Density: 344.2/sq mi (132.9/km^{2})
  - Rank: 466th of 565 in state 31st of 33 in county
- Time zone: UTC−05:00 (Eastern (EST))
  - Summer (DST): UTC−04:00 (Eastern (EDT))
- ZIP Codes: 08731 – Forked River; 08734 – Lanoka Harbor
- Area code: 609 exchanges: 242, 693, 971
- FIPS code: 3402937380
- GNIS feature ID: 0882072
- Website: www.laceytownship.org

Lacey Township is a township in Ocean County, in the U.S. state of New Jersey and is considered part of the Jersey Shore and South Jersey regions, as well as the New York metropolitan area. As of the 2020 United States census, the township's population was 28,655, an increase of 1,011 (+3.7%) from the 2010 census count of 27,644, which in turn reflected an increase of 2,298 (+9.1%) from the 25,346 counted in the 2000 census. The 2010 population was the highest recorded in any decennial census. It was named for Continental Army General John Lacey.

Lacey Township was incorporated as a township by an act of the New Jersey Legislature on March 23, 1871, from portions of Dover Township (now known as Toms River Township) and Union Township (now Barnegat Township). Portions of the township were taken on June 23, 1933, to form the borough of Island Beach (which is now Island Beach State Park, part of Berkeley Township). The township was named for Revolutionary War brigadier general John Lacey, who developed Ferrago Forge in 1809.

The Oyster Creek Nuclear Generating Station is located in the southern part of the township. The single-unit 636 MWe boiling water reactor power plant adjoins the Oyster Creek and is owned and operated by Exelon Corporation. It produced 9% of the state's electricity and is the nation's oldest operating nuclear power plant, having first been brought online on December 1, 1969, and is licensed to operate until April 9, 2029. In 2010, Exelon announced that it would close the facility in 2019 as part of an agreement with the State of New Jersey under which the plant would be allowed to operate without cooling towers. The plant, which had contributed a third of the township's budget through taxes, was closed in September 2018, after which a decommissioning process estimated to take eight years and cost $1.4 billion was to be undertaken.

Murray Grove is a Unitarian-Universalist retreat and conference center in Lanoka Harbor, traditionally considered the site where Universalism in America began.

== Geography ==
According to the United States Census Bureau, the township had a total area of 99.81 square miles (258.49 km^{2}), including 83.25 square miles (215.62 km^{2}) of land and 16.55 square miles (42.87 km^{2}) of water (16.58%).

Forked River (with a 2020 Census population of 5,274) is an unincorporated community and census-designated place (CDP) located within Lacey Township. Other unincorporated communities, localities and place names located partially or completely within the township include Aserdaten, Bamber Lake, Barnegat Pines, Batuber, Cedar Creek, Cedar Crest, Deer Head Lake, Good Luck, Lake Barnegat, Lanoka Harbor, Osteam, Red Oak Grove, Union Clay Works and Webbs Mill. The township's fire stations are named after the various areas of Lacey Township.

The township borders the Ocean County municipalities of Barnegat Township, Berkeley Township, Manchester Township and Ocean Township, as well as Woodland Township in Burlington County.

The north–south track of the Garden State Parkway serves as an informal use divider under the 1979 Pinelands Act and the subsequent Comprehensive Management Plan. To the east of the Parkway are more than 95% of Lacey's residential dwellings, located in the unincorporated areas of Lanoka Harbor and Forked River. To the Parkway's west is a mostly undisturbed pine and cedar forest, part of New Jersey's vast Pine Barrens. The forest is interspersed with a scattered few farms, houses and ranches, the tiny community of Bamber Lakes and open pit gravel quarries—all of which predate passage of the Pinelands Act or were developed under its tight zoning rules. The conditions of grandfathering vary—the mines' exceptions are to expire upon the deaths of their owners whereas the farms' exceptions are indefinite. Development west of the parkway, covering two-thirds of the township's area, is strictly controlled by the New Jersey Pinelands Commission.

Some Ocean County residents refer to all of Lacey Township as Forked River with the first word pronounced with two syllables (FOR-kid or FORK-id). Pronouncing the first word with one syllable is a sign of a non-native.

In a 2015 NJ.com poll with 91,000 respondents, Lacey Township was voted as part of South Jersey. According to the poll results, Lacey Township is South Jersey's northernmost Jersey Shore community.

== Demographics ==
Historical population
| Census | Pop. | Note | %± |
|---|---|---|---|
| 1880 | 814 | | — |
| 1890 | 711 | | −12.7% |
| 1900 | 718 | | 1.0% |
| 1910 | 602 | | −16.2% |
| 1920 | 504 | | −16.3% |
| 1930 | 692 | | 37.3% |
| 1940 | 752 | * | 8.7% |
| 1950 | 966 | | 28.5% |
| 1960 | 1,940 | | 100.8% |
| 1970 | 4,616 | | 137.9% |
| 1980 | 14,161 | | 206.8% |
| 1990 | 22,141 | | 56.4% |
| 2000 | 25,346 | | 14.5% |
| 2010 | 27,644 | | 9.1% |
| 2020 | 28,655 | | 3.7% |
| 2024 (est.) | 30,041 | | 4.8% |
Population sources:1880–2000 1880–1920 1880–1890; 1890–1910 1910–1930; 1940–2000 2000; 2010 2020 * = Lost territory in previous decade.

=== 2010 census ===
The 2010 United States census counted 27,644 people, 10,183 households, and 7,607 families in the township. The population density was 332.0 inhabitants per square mile (128.2/km^{2}). There were 11,573 housing units at an average density of 139.0 per square mile (53.7/km^{2}). The racial makeup was 96.15% (26,581) White, 0.60% (167) Black or African American, 0.14% (38) Native American, 0.80% (222) Asian, 0.02% (6) Pacific Islander, 1.14% (316) from other races, and 1.14% (314) from two or more races. Hispanic or Latino of any race were 4.74% (1,310) of the population.

Of the 10,183 households, 31.2% had children under the age of 18; 60.0% were married couples living together; 10.2% had a female householder with no husband present and 25.3% were non-families. Of all households, 20.1% were made up of individuals and 9.6% had someone living alone who was 65 years of age or older. The average household size was 2.71 and the average family size was 3.13.

23.1% of the population were under the age of 18, 8.1% from 18 to 24, 24.2% from 25 to 44, 29.8% from 45 to 64, and 14.8% who were 65 years of age or older. The median age was 41.3 years. For every 100 females, the population had 96.6 males. For every 100 females ages 18 and older there were 93.5 males.

The Census Bureau's 2006–2010 American Community Survey showed that (in 2010 inflation-adjusted dollars) median household income was $72,835 (with a margin of error of ± $3,271) and the median family income was $84,031 (± $6,930). Males had a median income of $56,748 (± $3,051) versus $40,360 (± $3,340) for females. The per capita income for the borough was $31,552 (± $1,524). About 2.2% of families and 3.8% of the population were below the poverty line, including 2.4% of those under age 18 and 4.6% of those age 65 or over.

=== 2000 census ===
As of the 2000 United States census there were 25,346 people, 9,336 households, and 7,244 families residing in the township. The population density was 301.7 inhabitants per square mile (116.5/km^{2}). There were 10,580 housing units at an average density of 126.0 per square mile (48.6/km^{2}). The racial makeup of the township was 97.85% White, 0.36% African American, 0.15% Native American, 0.55% Asian, 0.01% Pacific Islander, 0.41% from other races, and 0.68% from two or more races. Hispanic or Latino of any race were 2.15% of the population.

There were 9,336 households, out of which 35.1% had children under the age of 18 living with them, 64.5% were married couples living together, 9.4% had a female householder with no husband present, and 22.4% were non-families. 18.4% of all households were made up of individuals, and 9.3% had someone living alone who was 65 years of age or older. The average household size was 2.71 and the average family size was 3.08.

In the township the population was spread out, with 25.6% under the age of 18, 6.5% from 18 to 24, 28.2% from 25 to 44, 24.5% from 45 to 64, and 15.2% who were 65 years of age or older. The median age was 39 years. For every 100 females, there were 94.9 males. For every 100 females age 18 and over, there were 91.4 males.

The median income for a household in the township was $55,938, and the median income for a family was $61,298. Males had a median income of $47,406 versus $30,088 for females. The per capita income for the township was $23,136. About 3.7% of families and 4.5% of the population were below the poverty line, including 6.1% of those under age 18 and 4.5% of those age 65 or over.

== Economy ==
Lacey Township is home to many businesses, the largest employer has been the Oyster Creek Nuclear Generating Station. The facility, which closed in 2018, generated $70 million in wages in 2010 for its 700 employees, making it one of the largest employers in the county.

In the early to late 2000s, Lacey experienced rapid growth in recent years with the addition of many new developments and new "big-box" stores being built around the township. Previously, township residents had to travel to Stafford Township (Manahawkin) or Toms River to shop at these stores.

Recent local controversies have surrounded development and land use. In particular, a proposal to build a road on an old railroad right of way behind the ShopRite has been a major issue in the community. Other issues involve the lack of water resources to sustain the Home Depot (which opened in October 2007) and the 142,000-square-foot (13,200 m^{2}) Walmart that opened in October 2009.

== Arts and culture ==
The Old Schoolhouse Museum is a small old school building that was built in the mid-19th century as the first school in Forked River, and was used as a school until 1954.

The township had an annual Night of Lights on the Forked River, which was a boat parade at night in August. Owners dressed up their boats with lights and sailed down the river at night to the Captain's Inn. This had been changed to Rock the River after the original family that supported the event withdrew from involvement. It is now sponsored by local business and organizations and known as the Lacey Lights Boat Parade.

== Parks and recreation ==
Popcorn Park Zoo is a small 7-acre (28,000 m^{2}) zoo that hosts a wide range of animals and features big cats, monkeys and black bears among the 200 animals on the site. The zoo was established in 1977 at a facility covering 7 acres (2.8 ha).

The Relay for Life had been held annually at Gille Park to raise money towards cancer research. However, in 2010, the Lacey Township Committee did not allow the walk to be held at Gille, and it was moved to Veteran's Park in Bayville.

Much of the nearly 8,500-acre (3,400 ha) Double Trouble State Park is located within the township, but its main access point is in neighboring Berkeley Township. Robert J. Miller Air Park, also known as the Ocean County Airport, is a county-owned public-use airport partially located within Lacey Township, but also with its main entry point in Berkeley.

Township parks located within Lacey, include Clune, Gille, Hebrew and Huffy Wallis parks. The township is also home to a number of marinas, including the Forked River State Marina, which offers 125 berths.

Tices shoal, an area located on the bay side of Island Beach State Park, is located within the township. It is a popular summer destination for boaters because of its shallow waters and proximity to the Atlantic Ocean. Island Beach State Park, as well as the Barnegat Inlet, are accessible from the township via boat.

== Government ==
=== Local government ===
Lacey Township is governed under the Township form of New Jersey municipal government, one of 141 municipalities (of the 564) statewide that use this form, the second-most commonly used form of government in the state. The Township Committee is comprised of five members, who are elected directly by the voters at-large in partisan elections to serve three-year terms of office on a staggered basis, with either one or two seats coming up for election each year as part of the November general election in a three-year cycle. At an annual reorganization meeting, the Township Committee selects one of its members to serve as Mayor.

As of 2024, members of the Lacey Township Committee are Mayor Peggy Sue Juliano (R, term on committee ends December 31, 2026; term as mayor ends 2024), Deputy Mayor Peter A. Curatolo (R, term on committee ends 2025; term as deputy mayor ends 2024), Mark Dykoff (R, 2024) and Steven C. Kennis (R, 2025) and Timothy McDonald (R, 2024).

=== Federal, state, and county representation ===
Lacey Township is located in the 2nd and 4th Congressional Districts and is part of New Jersey's 9th state legislative district.

For the 119th United States Congress, New Jersey's 2nd congressional district is represented by Jeff Van Drew (R, Dennis Township). For the 119th United States Congress, New Jersey's 4th congressional district is represented by Chris Smith (R, Manchester Township). New Jersey is represented in the United States Senate by Democrats Cory Booker (Newark, term ends 2027) and Andy Kim (Moorestown, term ends 2031).

For the 2026–2027 session, the 9th legislative district of the New Jersey Legislature is represented in the State Senate by Carmen Amato (R, Berkeley Township) and in the General Assembly by Greg Myhre (R, Stafford Township) and Brian E. Rumpf (R, Little Egg Harbor Township).

Ocean County is governed by a Board of County Commissioners composed of five members who are elected on an at-large basis in partisan elections and serving staggered three-year terms of office, with either one or two seats coming up for election each year as part of the November general election. At an annual reorganization held in the beginning of January, the board chooses a director and a deputy director from among its members. As of 2025, Ocean County's Commissioners (with party affiliation, term-end year and residence) are:

John P. Kelly (R, 2025, Eagleswood Township), Virginia E. Haines (R, 2025, Toms River), Robert Arace (R, Manchester Township, 2027) Jennifer Bacchione (R, Berkeley Township, 2027) and Frank Sadeghi (R, 2026, Toms River).

Constitutional officers elected on a countywide basis are: Clerk Scott M. Colabella (R, 2025, Barnegat Light), Sheriff Michael G. Mastronardy (R, 2025; Toms River) and Surrogate Jeffrey Moran (R, 2028, Beachwood).

=== Politics ===
As of March 2011, there were a total of 18,255 registered voters in Lacey Township, of which 3,172 (17.4%) were registered as Democrats, 5,043 (27.6%) were registered as Republicans and 10,035 (55.0%) were registered as Unaffiliated. There were 5 voters registered as Libertarians or Greens. Among the township's 2010 Census population, 66.0% (vs. 63.2% in Ocean County) were registered to vote, including 85.8% of those ages 18 and over (vs. 82.6% countywide).

Gubernatorial election results for Lacey Township
| Year | Republican | | Democratic | | Third party(ies) | |
| Year | No. | % | No. | % | No. | % |
|---|---|---|---|---|---|---|
| 2025 | 9,812 | 69.08% | 4,324 | 30.44% | 68 | 0.48% |
| 2021 | 8,712 | 74.50% | 2,892 | 24.73% | 90 | 0.77% |
| 2017 | 5,184 | 66.62% | 2,425 | 31.17% | 172 | 2.21% |
| 2013 | 6,394 | 75.18% | 1,966 | 23.12% | 145 | 1.70% |
| 2009 | 6,314 | 70.03% | 2,154 | 23.89% | 548 | 6.08% |
| 2005 | 5,082 | 59.33% | 3,032 | 35.40% | 452 | 5.28% |

In the 2012 presidential election, Republican Mitt Romney received 59.1% of the vote (7,438 cast), ahead of Democrat Barack Obama with 39.7% (4,998 votes), and other candidates with 1.3% (159 votes), among the 12,696 ballots cast by the township's 19,182 registered voters (101 ballots were spoiled), for a turnout of 66.2%. In the 2008 presidential election, Republican John McCain received 59.4% of the vote (8,188 cast), ahead of Democrat Barack Obama with 38.4% (5,286 votes) and other candidates with 1.5% (200 votes), among the 13,776 ballots cast by the township's 19,102 registered voters, for a turnout of 72.1%. In the 2004 presidential election, Republican George W. Bush received 63.3% of the vote (8,300 ballots cast), outpolling Democrat John Kerry with 35.5% (4,655 votes) and other candidates with 0.6% (107 votes), among the 13,102 ballots cast by the township's 17,986 registered voters, for a turnout percentage of 72.8.

Presidential Elections Results
| Year | Republican | Democratic | Third Parties |
|---|---|---|---|
| 2024 | 70.1% 12,461 | 28.3% 5,034 | 1.6% 226 |
| 2020 | 67.5% 11,950 | 30.7% 5,436 | 1.8% 254 |
| 2016 | 70.1% 9,762 | 26.9% 3,746 | 3.0% 418 |
| 2012 | 59.1% 7,438 | 39.7% 4,998 | 1.3% 159 |
| 2008 | 59.4% 8,188 | 38.4% 5,286 | 1.5% 200 |
| 2004 | 63.3% 8,300 | 35.5% 4,655 | 0.6% 107 |

In the 2013 gubernatorial election, Republican Chris Christie received 75.2% of the vote (6,394 cast), ahead of Democrat Barbara Buono with 23.1% (1,966 votes), and other candidates with 1.7% (145 votes), among the 8,698 ballots cast by the township's 19,068 registered voters (193 ballots were spoiled), for a turnout of 45.6%. In the 2009 gubernatorial election, Republican Chris Christie received 69.3% of the vote (6,314 ballots cast), ahead of Democrat Jon Corzine with 23.6% (2,154 votes), Independent Chris Daggett with 5.0% (459 votes) and other candidates with 1.0% (89 votes), among the 9,109 ballots cast by the township's 18,618 registered voters, yielding a 48.9% turnout.

United States Senate election results for Lacey Township1
| Year | Republican | | Democratic | | Third party(ies) | |
| Year | No. | % | No. | % | No. | % |
|---|---|---|---|---|---|---|
| 2024 | 11,397 | 67.08% | 5,447 | 32.06% | 146 | 0.86% |
| 2018 | 7,764 | 69.08% | 3,119 | 27.75% | 356 | 3.17% |
| 2012 | 7,074 | 59.54% | 4,550 | 38.29% | 258 | 2.17% |
| 2006 | 5,670 | 61.87% | 3,190 | 34.81% | 305 | 3.33% |

United States Senate election results for Lacey Township2
| Year | Republican | | Democratic | | Third party(ies) | |
| Year | No. | % | No. | % | No. | % |
|---|---|---|---|---|---|---|
| 2020 | 11,525 | 67.52% | 5,237 | 30.68% | 308 | 1.80% |
| 2014 | 4,294 | 60.91% | 2,501 | 35.48% | 255 | 3.62% |
| 2013 | 3,238 | 67.90% | 1,474 | 30.91% | 57 | 1.20% |
| 2008 | 7,526 | 59.26% | 4,911 | 38.67% | 262 | 2.06% |

== Education ==
The Lacey Township School District serves students in kindergarten through twelfth grade. As of the 2021–22 school year, the district, comprised of six schools, had an enrollment of 3,864 students and 334.0 classroom teachers (on an FTE basis), for a student–teacher ratio of 11.6:1. Schools in the district (with 2021–22 enrollment data from the National Center for Education Statistics) are Mill Pond Elementary School with 635 students in grades 5-6 (now PreK-K), Cedar Creek Elementary School with 437 students in grades K-4 (now 1-5), Forked River Elementary School with 465 students in grades K-4 (now 1-5), Lanoka Harbor Elementary School with 449 students in grades K-4 (now 1-5), Lacey Township Middle School with 608 students in grades 7-8 (now 6-8) and Lacey Township High School with 1,256 students in grades 9-12.

St. Mary Academy in Manahawkin, a K–8 school of the Roman Catholic Diocese of Trenton, is in the area. From 1997, until 2019 it operated as All Saints Regional Catholic School and was collectively managed by five churches, with one being St. Pius X Church, in the township and adjacent to the Forked River CDP. In 2019 St. Mary Church in Barnegat took entire control of the school, which remained on the same Manahawkin campus, and changed its name. The other churches no longer operate the school but still may send students there.

== Media ==
The Asbury Park Press and The Press of Atlantic City provide daily news coverage of the township, as does WOBM-FM radio. The township provides material and commentary to The Southern Ocean Times, which also serves Barnegat Township, Long Beach Island, Ocean Township (Waretown), Stafford Township (Manahawkin) and Tuckerton as one of seven weekly papers from Micromedia Publications.

In terms of televised news coverage, both New York City and Philadelphia television stations provide coverage of the township, as the media markets of both cities overlap in the township, as they do in much of Ocean County.

== Transportation ==
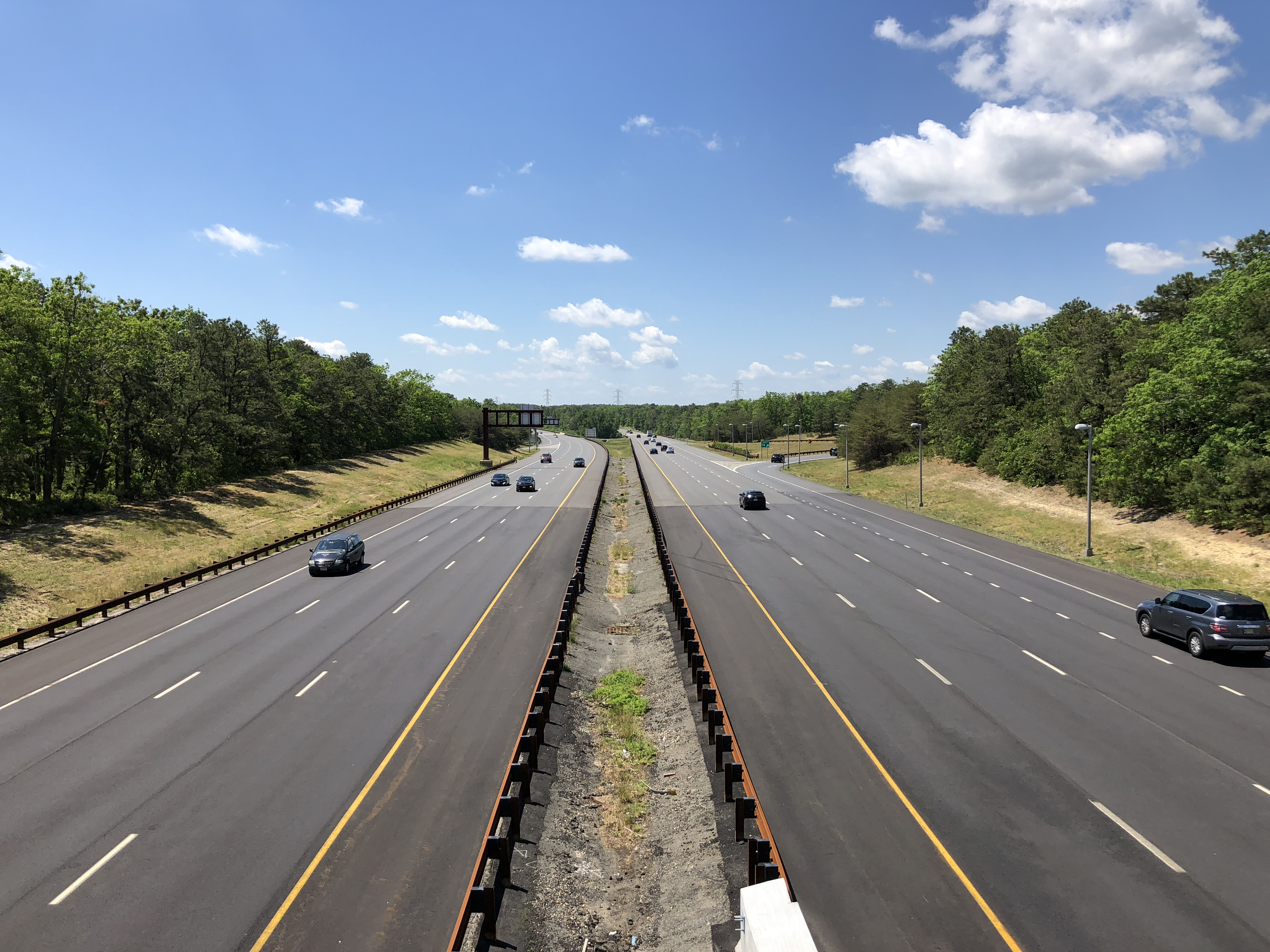
The southbound Garden State Parkway in Lacey Township

=== Roads and highways ===
As of May 2010, the township had a total of 194.40 miles (312.86 km) of roadways, of which 155.81 miles (250.75 km) were maintained by the municipality, 28.45 miles (45.79 km) by Ocean County, 4.45 miles (7.16 km) by the New Jersey Department of Transportation and 5.69 miles (9.16 km) by the New Jersey Turnpike Authority.

The Garden State Parkway passes through the township, connecting Ocean Township in the south to Berkeley Township in the north. The Forked River Service Area is located at milepost 76 on the Parkway and Interchange 74 is signed for access to Forked River and Waretown. U.S. Route 9 also traverses the township in the eastern part. County Route 539 passes through in the western area but without any intersections to other roads in the municipality.

=== Public transportation ===
NJ Transit provides bus service between the township and Atlantic City on the 559 bus route.

Academy Bus offers Parkway Express routes from the Forked River Service Area to the Port Authority Bus Terminal in Midtown Manhattan or to Wall Street in Lower Manhattan. Ocean Ride local service is provided on the OC5 Lacey route.

There is no rail service in the township. In the late nineteenth and early-to-mid twentieth centuries, the township was served by the Tuckerton Railroad, Toms River Railroad, and the Central Railroad of New Jersey (CNJ). The CNJ's former roadbed, running parallel to Route 9, has been partially converted to the Barnegat Branch Trail, a rail trail. The Tuckerton Railroad's former roadbed runs parallel to Lacey Road, ending in nearby Whiting. Today, the closest train stations are in Bay Head, with service on the North Jersey Coast Line toward New York City, and Absecon, with service on the Atlantic City Line toward Atlantic City and Philadelphia.

== Notable people ==
People who were born in, residents of, or otherwise closely associated with Lacey Township include:

- Christopher J. Connors (born 1956), represents the 9th Legislative District in the New Jersey Senate
- Tom DeBlass (born 1982), mixed martial artist and Brazilian Jiu-Jitsu practitioner
- Melissa Drexler (born 1978), was nicknamed in the media as "The Prom Mom" after she delivered a baby in a restroom stall during her high school prom in 1997
- Keith Elias (born 1972), former National Football League running back for the New York Giants
- Chris Fleming (born 1970), basketball player who played at the University of Richmond before starring in Germany and becoming an assistant coach with the Brooklyn Nets He is currently
- Mark Leiter Jr. (born 1991), baseball pitcher
- "Irish" Teddy Mann (1951–2024), former world-rated middleweight boxer
- Brady Noon (born 2005), actor known for his roles in Boardwalk Empire, Good Boys and The Mighty Ducks: Game Changers
- Scott Palguta (born 1982), professional soccer player
- Thomas Potter (1689–1777), farmer who in 1760 built a chapel in Good Luck for the purpose of spreading the doctrine of Universalism
- Jorge A. Rod (born 1947), politician who served as mayor of Lacey Township and in the New Jersey General Assembly from the 9th Legislative District from 1982 to 1986
- Warren Smith (born 1990), professional quarterback
- Rhett Titus (born 1987), professional wrestler
- Alex Wojciechowicz (1915–1992), two-way football player who played at center on offense and at linebacker on defense who has been inducted into both the College and Pro Football Halls of Fame
