= Bamber Lake, New Jersey =

Location in Lacey Township, NJ, US

- Unincorporated community
- Location within Ocean County. Inset: Location of Ocean County in the state of New Jersey Bamber Lake, New Jersey (New Jersey) Bamber Lake, New Jersey (the United States)
- Coordinates: 39°53′26″N 074°18′44″W
- Country: United States
- State: New Jersey
- County: Ocean
- Township: Lacey
- Established: 1809
- Elevation: 79 ft (24 m)
- Time zone: UTC-5 (Eastern (EST))
  - Summer (DST): UTC-4 (EDT)
- ZIP code: 08731
- GNIS feature ID: 2047029

Bamber Lake is an unincorporated community located in Lacey Township, New Jersey, United States, west of the Garden State Parkway. The area is protected by the “New Jersey Pinelands Comprehensive Management Plan of 1979, which has placed limits on the development in these areas”. The two prominent roads for the area are Lacey Road and Dover Road, which provide the only direct routes to Bamber Lake. The lake has two beachfronts and a man-made dam with a walk across bridge. In addition to the lake, which can be used for fishing, swimming, and non-motorized watercraft, the area provides many recreational facilities including two playgrounds, a soccer field, a tennis court, and a basketball court. The area is also well known for its many trails for hiking and hunting.

Originally named Ferrago Village, Bamber Lake was founded in 1809 by General John Lacey. The area was once called Cedar Crest in the early 20th century.

== Gallery ==
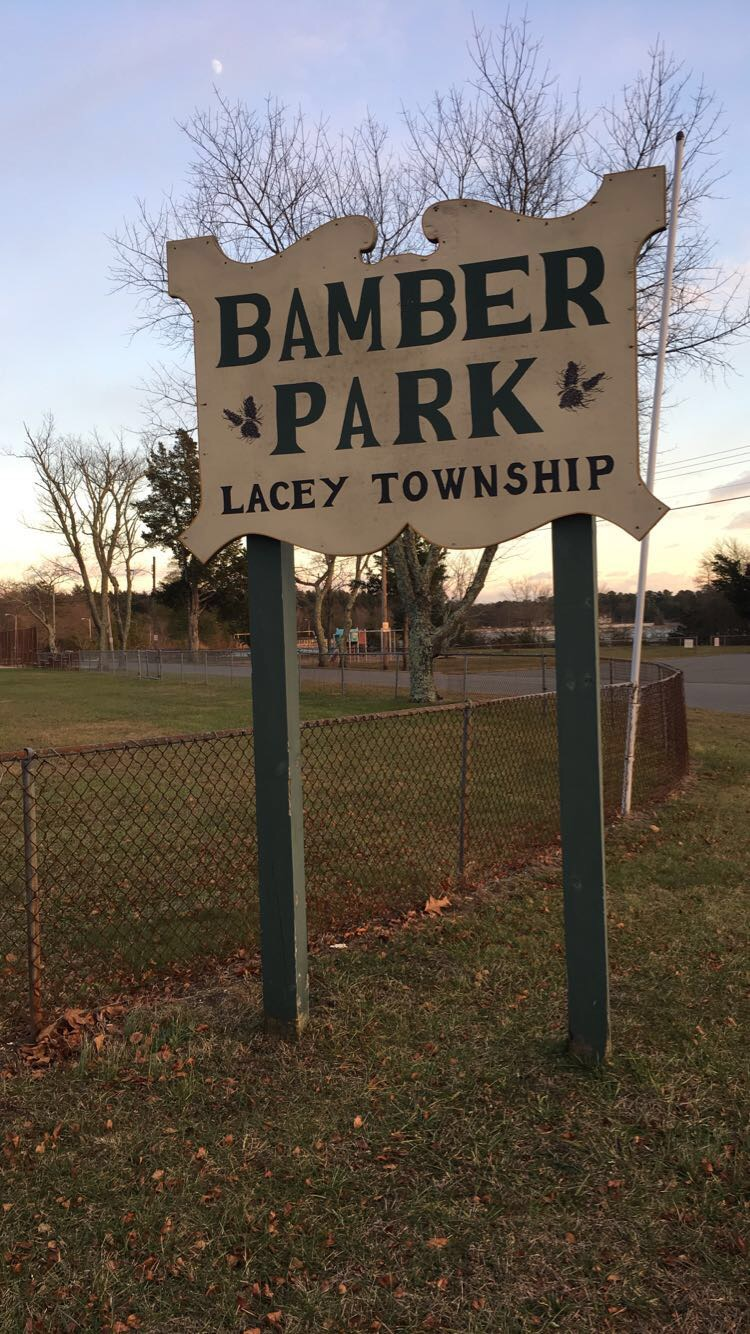
Bamber Park sign

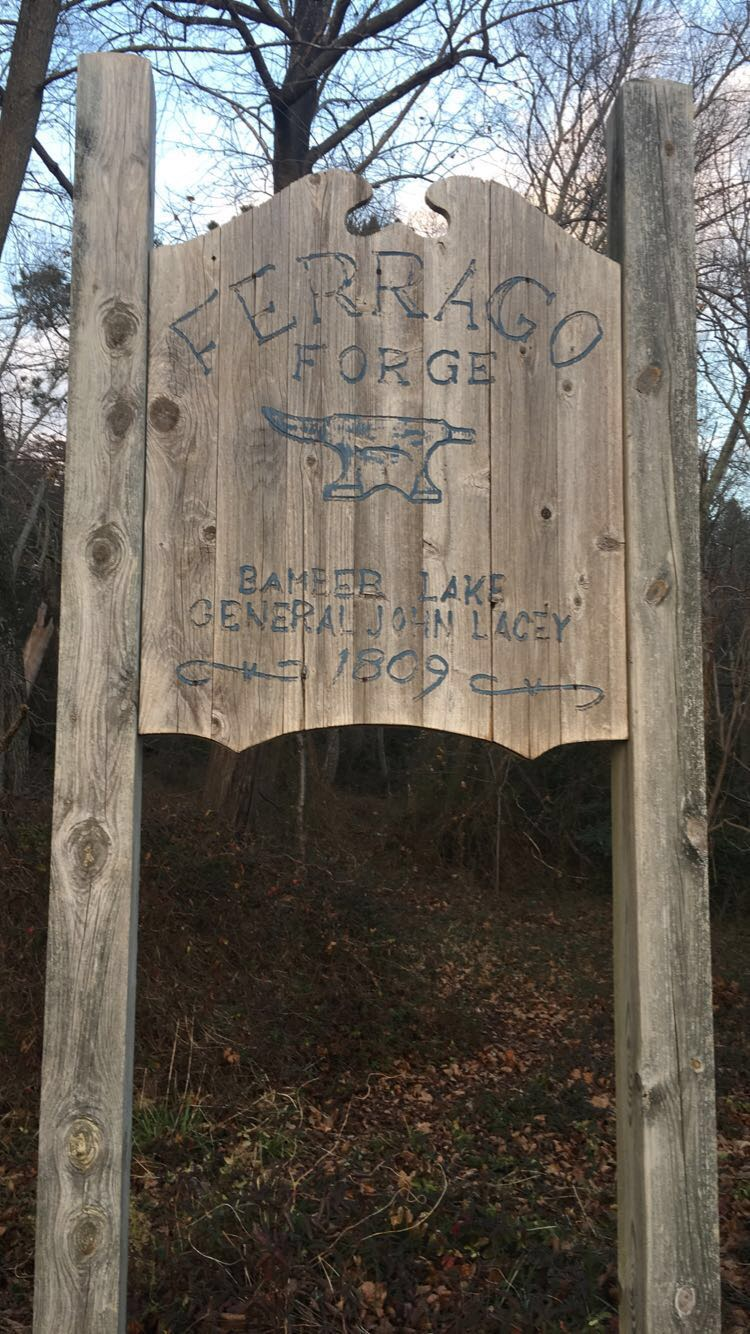
Ferrago Forge sign

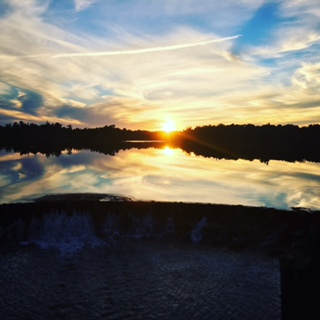
Sunset over Bamber Lake
