= Warminster Heights, Pennsylvania =

Unincorporated community in Pennsylvania, US

Warminster Heights, Pennsylvania Lacey Park
- Census-designated place
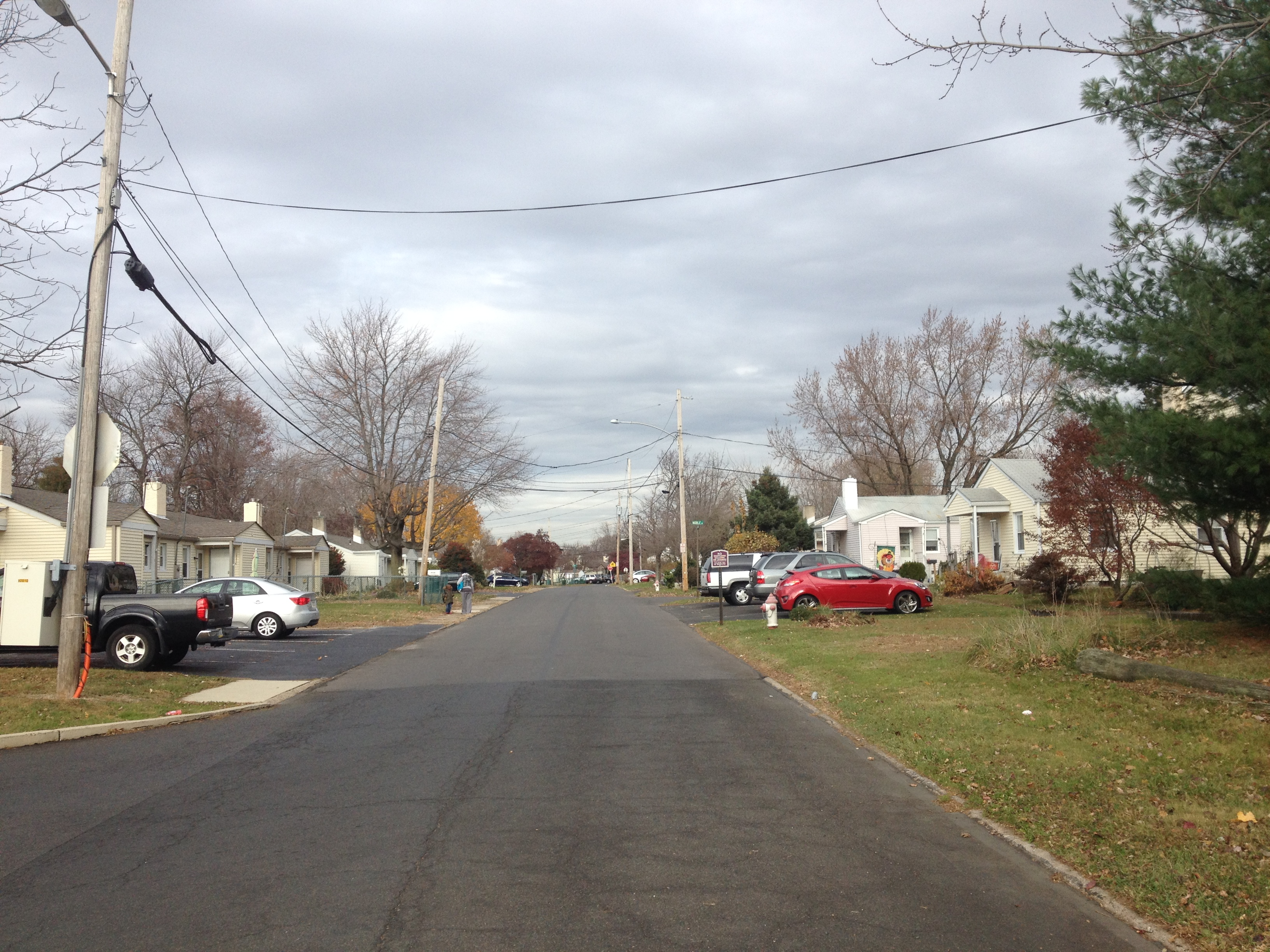
- Jamison Street in Warminster Heights
- Nicknames: LP, LPP, Lacey Park Projects, Parkers, The Park
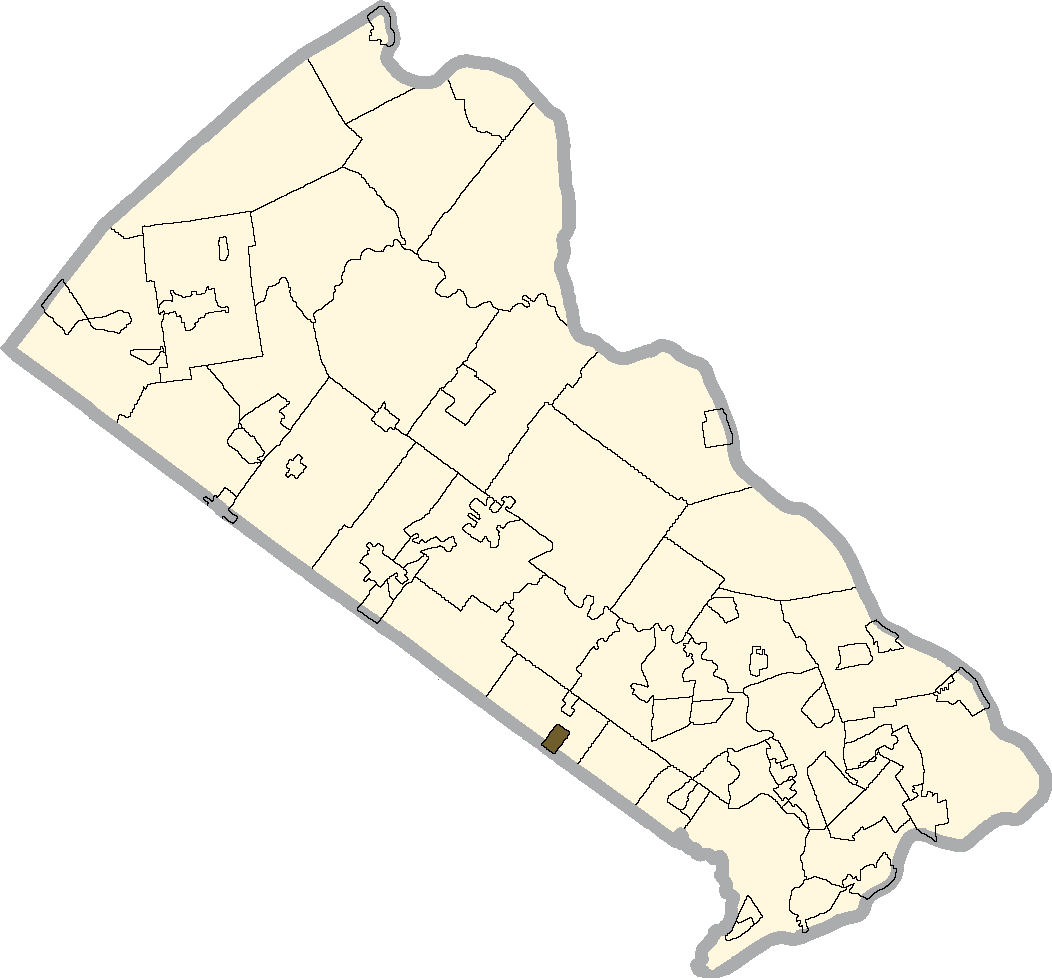
- Location of Warminster Heights in Bucks County

- Location of Warminster Heights in Pennsylvania Warminster Heights (the United States)
- Coordinates: 40°11′13″N 75°04′54″W
- Country: United States
- State: Pennsylvania
- County: Bucks
- Township: Warminster

Area
  - Total: 0.6 sq mi (1.6 km^{2})
  - Land: 0.6 sq mi (1.6 km^{2})
  - Water: 0.0 sq mi (0 km^{2})
- Elevation: 315 ft (96 m)

Population (2010)
  - Total: 4,124
  - Density: 6,900/sq mi (2,700/km^{2})
- Time zone: UTC-5 (Eastern (EST))
  - Summer (DST): UTC-4 (EDT)
- ZIP code: 18974
- Area codes: 215, 267, and 445
- GNIS feature ID: 1193608

Warminster Heights is a census-designated place and part of Warminster Township in Bucks County, Pennsylvania, United States. It is located near the eastern border of Hatboro in Montgomery County. The population was 4,124 at the 2010 census.

== History ==
This neighborhood, built in 1943, formerly served as the civilian housing area for the long-defunct Brewster Aeronautical Corporation, established in 1941, while the area was still referred to as Johnsville. The military facility was later known as Johnsville Naval Air Base, separated from the residential area and later became the Naval Air Development Center and was finally known as the NAWC, Aircraft Division, Warminster prior to its being decommissioned and closed by the US federal government in the mid-1990s. The community was previously named Lacey Park, for Pennsylvania Militia General John Lacey, who fought during the American Revolutionary War at the Battle of Crooked Billet, which took place near the neighborhood. It is still referred to colloquially as Lacey Park by local residents.

In the 1960s, Lacey Park was renamed Warminster Heights, although to this day many older area residents prefer the former name when referring to the neighborhood. Deserved or not, it had a somewhat odious reputation among the local population as it was a lower class, blue collar, low-rent public housing district during the 1960s and '70s up to the mid-1980s. The housing project had over 10,000 health and safety violations and was known as the "worst suburban slum in Pennsylvania." It suffered from a high crime rate and a high rate of house fires. Built in the 1940s by the US federal government, most of the housing units consisted of cinder block on slab construction, in units of four dwellings per structure (similar to Philadelphia row homes), in either one or two stories, generally with central heating via coal or heating oil furnaces with mostly electric appliances. Between 1957 and 1975 the housing units were under private ownership; in 1975 the Redevelopment Authority of Bucks County took over and managed the properties, and in 1986 ownership was turned over to a housing cooperative called the Warminster Heights Home Owners' Association. The housing cooperative began renovating the units following the assumption of ownership. The neighborhood has worked hard to repair its image. It has been known over the years for instances of murder and other violent crimes. The Park, as it is often referred to, has a history and longstanding association with poverty, alcohol abuse, and constant drug activity. (See references)

== Geography ==
Warminster Heights is located at 40°11′10″N 75°5′6″W (40.186208, -75.085070).

According to the United States Census Bureau, the CDP has a total area of 0.6 square miles (1.6 km^{2}), all land.

== Demographics ==
Historical population
Census	Pop.	Note	%±
1990	4,310		—
2000	4,191		−2.8%
2010	4,124		−1.6%
2020	4,010		−2.8%

=== 2020 census ===
As of the 2020 census, Warminster Heights had a population of 4,010. The median age was 36.4 years. 22.2% of residents were under the age of 18 and 14.9% of residents were 65 years of age or older. For every 100 females there were 92.0 males, and for every 100 females age 18 and over there were 85.9 males age 18 and over.

100.0% of residents lived in urban areas, while 0.0% lived in rural areas.

There were 1,681 households in Warminster Heights, of which 26.7% had children under the age of 18 living in them. Of all households, 33.8% were married-couple households, 22.2% were households with a male householder and no spouse or partner present, and 37.5% were households with a female householder and no spouse or partner present. About 33.8% of all households were made up of individuals and 12.7% had someone living alone who was 65 years of age or older.

There were 1,758 housing units, of which 4.4% were vacant. The homeowner vacancy rate was 0.3% and the rental vacancy rate was 4.2%.

Racial composition as of the 2020 census
Race	Number	Percent
White	2,295	57.2%
Black or African American	496	12.4%
American Indian and Alaska Native	30	0.7%
Asian	201	5.0%
Native Hawaiian and Other Pacific Islander	7	0.2%
Some other race	546	13.6%
Two or more races	435	10.8%
Hispanic or Latino (of any race)	986	24.6%

=== 2010 census ===
In 2010, Warminster Heights had a population of 4,124 people. The racial makeup of the CDP was 60.7% White, 10.6% African American, 0.8% Native American, 3.3% Asian, 0.2% Pacific Islander, 18.4% from other races, and 5.9% from two or more races. 35.1% of the population were Hispanic or Latino of any race.

=== 2000 census ===
As of the census of 2000, there were 4,191 people, 1,523 households, and 1,009 families residing in the CDP. The population density was 6,802.0 inhabitants per square mile (2,626.3/km^{2}). There were 1,647 housing units at an average density of 2,673.1 per square mile (1,032.1/km^{2}). The racial makeup of the CDP was 65.35% White, 13.08% African American, 0.43% Native American, 3.96% Asian, 0.02% Pacific Islander, 12.60% from other races, and 4.56% from two or more races. Hispanic or Latino of any race were 24.03% of the population.

There were 1,523 households, out of which 36.1% had children under the age of 18 living with them, 36.4% were married couples living together, 22.5% had a female householder with no husband present, and 33.7% were non-families. 26.9% of all households were made up of individuals, and 10.8% had someone living alone who was 65 years of age or older. The average household size was 2.74 and the average family size was 3.30.

In the CDP, the population was spread out, with 29.7% under the age of 18, 12.1% from 18 to 24, 32.5% from 25 to 44, 15.7% from 45 to 64, and 10.1% who were 65 years of age or older. The median age was 30 years. For every 100 females, there were 96.8 males. For every 100 females age 18 and over, there were 93.2 males.

The median income for a household in the CDP was $32,196, and the median income for a family was $37,056. Males had a median income of $28,493 versus $24,423 for females. The per capita income for the CDP was $14,610. About 15.7% of families and 19.7% of the population were below the poverty line, including 26.2% of those under age 18 and 18.1% of those age 65 or over.

== Education ==
The Centennial School District serves the community.

Private schools:

- Delaware Valley Private School (Defunct)

== Infrastructure ==
=== Transportation ===
Major roads near Warminster Heights include northwest-southeast Pennsylvania Route 132 (Street Road) to the northeast, southwest-northeast Pennsylvania Route 332 (Jacksonville Road) to the northwest, and northwest-southeast County Line Road to the southwest. SEPTA provides bus service to Warminster Heights along SEPTA City Bus Route 22, which heads south to Willow Grove and Olney Transportation Center in North Philadelphia. The Warminster station, which serves as the terminus of SEPTA Regional Rail's Warminster Line to Center City Philadelphia, is located just to the northwest of Warminster Heights.

=== Utilities ===
Electricity and natural gas in Warminster Heights is provided by PECO Energy Company, a subsidiary of Exelon. Trash and recycling collection in Warminster Heights is provided under contract by J.P. Mascaro & Sons. Cable, telephone, and internet service to the area is provided by Xfinity and Verizon. Warminster Heights is served by area codes 215, 267, and 445. Water and sewer service in Warminster Heights is provided by the Warminster Municipal Authority.

== Sources ==
- The Philadelphia Inquirer
- http://patch.com/pennsylvania/warminster/hunt-for-persons-of-interest-in-stabbing-underway-family-mourns
- The Philadelphia Inquirer
- The Philadelphia Inquirer
- http://www.montgomerynews.com/articles/2014/04/07/public_spirit_willow_grove_guide/news/doc533aed60b5497096395418.txt
- http://m.phillyburbs.com/news/negron-found-not-guilty-of-homicide/article_7c7ffc66-ba72-5d55-9954-a2d7b53af50a.html?mode=jqm
