= MJX =

MJX or mjx may refer to:

- MJX, the IATA and FAA LID code for Robert J. Miller Air Park, New Jersey, United States
- mjx, the ISO 639-3 code for Mahali language
