= Aserdaten, New Jersey =

Populated place in Ocean County, New Jersey, US

- Unincorporated community
- Location within Ocean County. Inset: Location of Ocean County in the state of New Jersey Aserdaten, New Jersey (New Jersey) Aserdaten, New Jersey (the United States)
- Coordinates: 39°51′23″N 74°20′17″W
- Country: United States
- State: New Jersey
- County: Ocean
- Township: Lacey
- Elevation: 45 ft (14 m)
- Time zone: UTC−05:00 (Eastern (EST))
  - Summer (DST): UTC−04:00 (EDT)
- GNIS feature ID: 882943

Aserdaten is an unincorporated community and ghost town located within Lacey Township in Ocean County, in the U.S. state of New Jersey.

The former community is located within the Greenwood Forest Wildlife Management Area, surrounded by the densely forested Pine Barrens.

In 1893, Aserdaten was noted by the United States Geological Survey as a "village in Lacey Township".

A forest fire watch tower, the Cedar Bridge Lookout Tower, was located in "the remote area of Aserdaten" until 1983.
