= George Matthews (soldier) =

American soldier (1726-1798)

Captain George Matthews (1726-1798) was a signer of the 1790 Pennsylvania Constitution, a veteran of the Indian War in 1746, an ensign in the French Indian War in 1756-1764 under Captain Samuel Perry, a captain in the Revolutionary War under Colonel Joseph Armstrong, a justice of the peace in 1785, an Associate Judge, 1791–1794, commissioned by the first Governor of Pennsylvania, Thomas Mifflin, and a church trustee and elder of the Rocky Spring Presbyterian Church. A blacksmith by trade, Captain Matthews was born in Ireland, but resided in Hamilton Township in Franklin County, Pennsylvania, until his death. Matthews served as a representative to the Pennsylvania 1789 Constitutional Conventional and subsequently signed the 1790 Constitution. After problems became apparent with the Constitution of 1776, a campaign to change the Pennsylvania constitution followed. The 1790 Constitution has been described as a "model" constitution resembling modern day constitutions. It provided a workable frame of government with effective checks and balances to protect citizens from arbitrary government action.

== Military career ==
During the American Revolutionary War, Matthews served as a captain in the 5th Battalion of the Cumberland County Militia under Colonel Joseph Armstrong. He and the men with whom he served were noted for their activity, bravery, alertness, and Presbyterian faith. Matthews was reportedly wounded at the Battle of Crooked Billet fought against British forces on May 1, 1778, near the Crooked Billet Tavern. The tavern was a spot visited by George Washington and his officers.

== Religion ==
Captain Matthews was an elder and trustee in Rocky Spring Church built in 1738 and reconstructed in 1794. A land warrant for 5 acres in 1792 upon which to construct the church bears his name. He was a pew holder during Reverend John Craighead's ministry of 1768-1794 and occupied pew number forty-five. In 1800 under Reverend Francis Herron's ministry he occupied pew number six with his wife, Isabella (Lee). The pews in Rocky Spring Church were paid for by the church members. The pews that were installed in the original log church were transferred to the current location upon the church's reconstruction in 1794. The location of your family's pew within the church not only determined your visibility, but was indicative of your status within the church. Captain Matthews died in his residence in Hamilton Township, Franklin County, PA and is thought to be buried in the Rocky Spring Church's Graveyard. No headstone, however, has been found or deciphered that carries his name. His estate appeared in Orphan's Court in 1799. Colonel Joseph Armstrong under whom he served during the Revolution accepted guardianship of his minor children upon his death.

== Family ==
Captain Matthews is reportedly the son of James Matthews and his wife, Mary Ann, who immigrated to America in 1741. He reportedly married Isabella Lee (1730-1801) in 1750, however no original records have been found. Isabella's will of 1801 which followed the death of her husband, identifies her as "a relic of George Matthews." They had twelve children during their marriage: Abigail (Josiah Nash); George, Jr.; John; Margaret (John Wilkerson); James (Prudence Gordon); Jean (Isaac Eaton); Isabella (Casper Taylor); William George; Samuel; Mary (Thomas Fleming); Agnes; Elizabeth (Robert Walker).
