= Rocky Spring Presbyterian Church =

Historic church in Pennsylvania, United States

- U.S. National Register of Historic Places
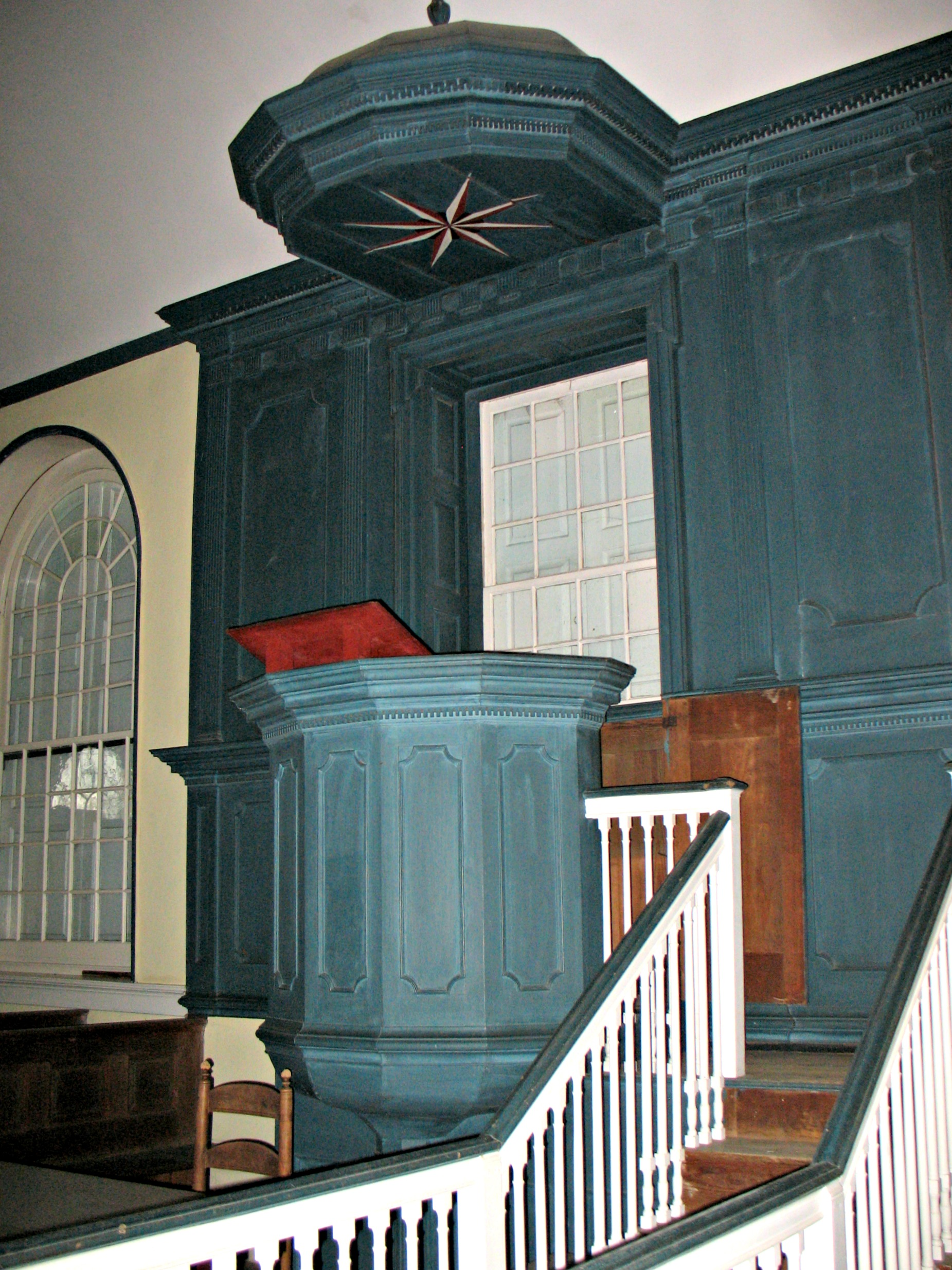

- Location within Pennsylvania Location within the United States
- Location: Rocky Spring Road, approximately 0.5 miles (0.80 km) northwest of Funk Road, Letterkenny Township, Pennsylvania
- Coordinates: 39°59′19″N 77°40′35″W
- Area: 2 acres (0.81 ha)
- Built: 1794
- Architect: Beatty, Walter
- Architectural style: Georgian
- NRHP reference No.: 94000430
- Added to NRHP: May 13, 1994

The Rocky Spring Presbyterian Church is a historic American Presbyterian church located in Letterkenny Township, Pennsylvania, United States.

It was added to the National Register of Historic Places in 1994.

== History and architectural features ==
Built in 1794, this historic structure is a 1 1/2-story, four by six-bay, brick, Georgian-style building that measures forty-eight feet by sixty feet, and has a gable roof. The interior of the church includes two ten-plate stoves, brick aisleways, a crude ladder leading to a loft, and wooden pews that are long and narrow with high straight-backed seating. The ends of the pews are carved with the names of the previous occupants identifying the military ranks they held during the Revolutionary War.

Rocky Springs Church was a pay-for-pew church that required members to sign a financial agreement between the trustees of the church and the pew holders requiring an annual fee for occupancy of the pew.

The Church's pulpit is circular in form and positioned above the pews giving the speaker full view of the congregation. Above the pulpit is an oval-shaped canopy or sounding board.

Five acres of land to build the church were acquired by warrant on November 6, 1792. Trustees of the congregation who acquired the land upon which to build the church included: George Matthews, Esq., James McCalmont, Esq., James Ferguson, Esq., James Culbertson, Esq., and Samuel Culbertson. The property includes the church cemetery; the oldest gravestone dates to the 1780s. The oldest dated gravestone is John Burns' and is dated 1760.

== Gallery ==
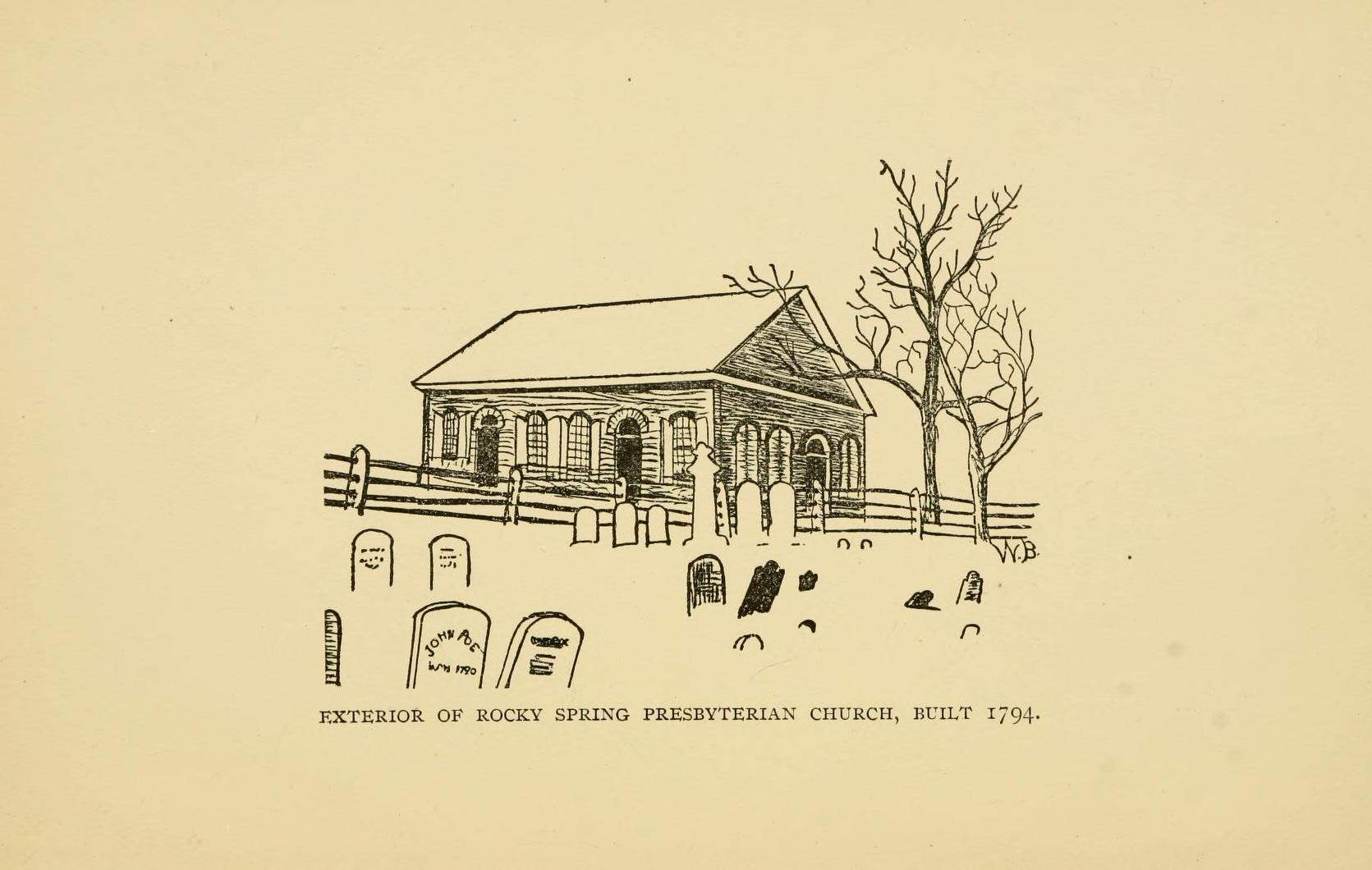
Drawing made in 1894 for the centennial

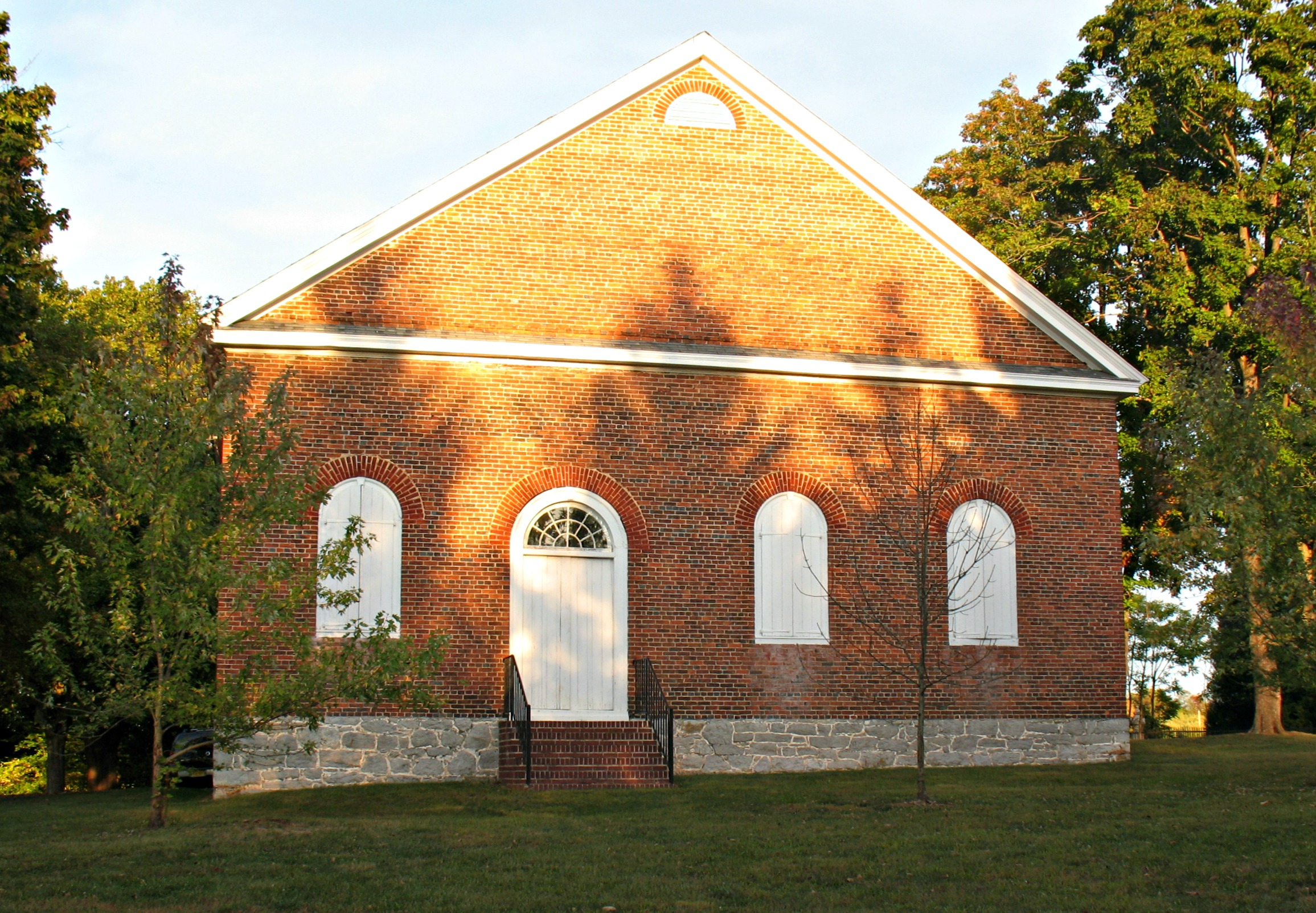
Rocky Spring Church, 2013

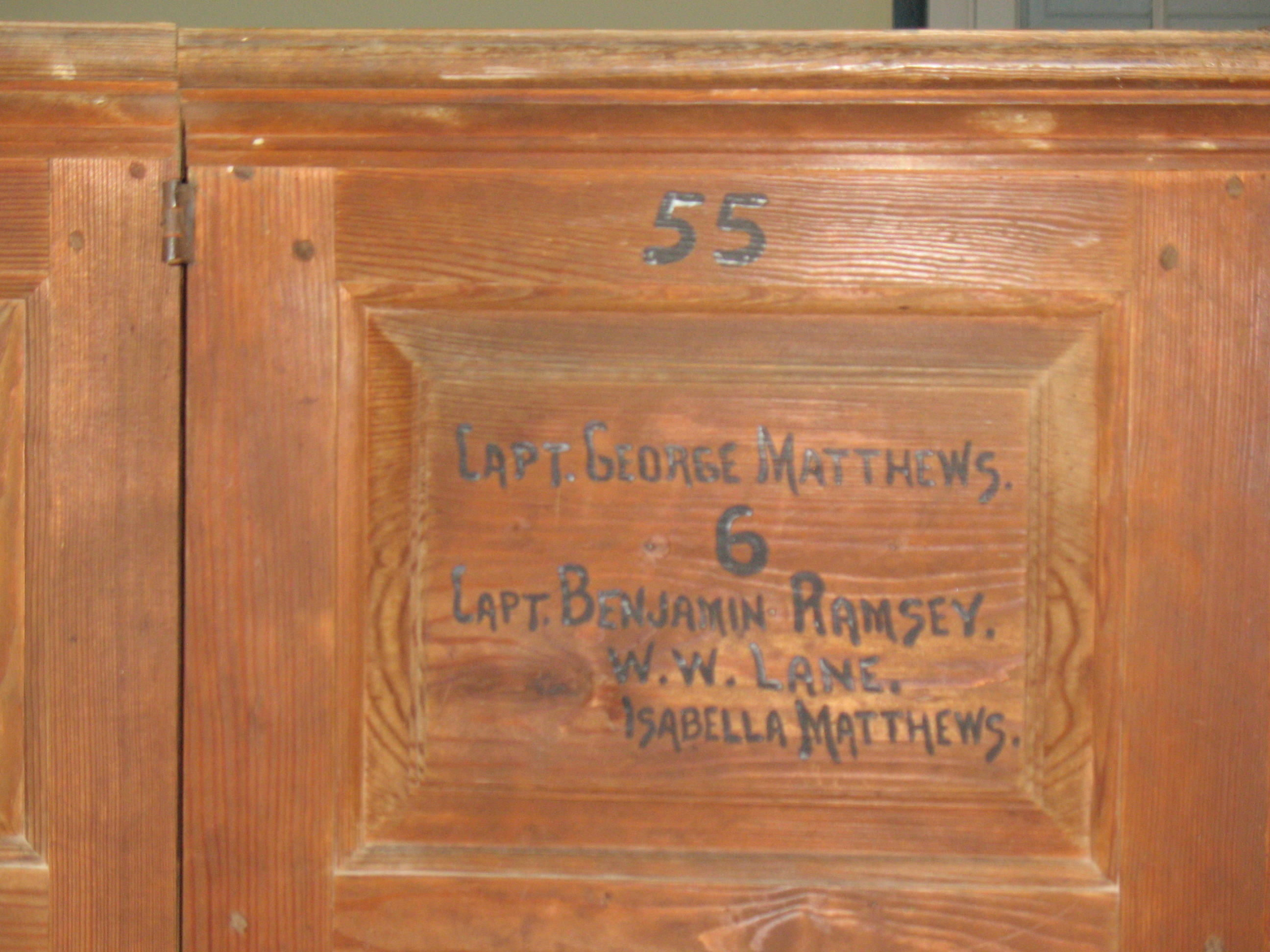
Pews carved with the name of the pew holder

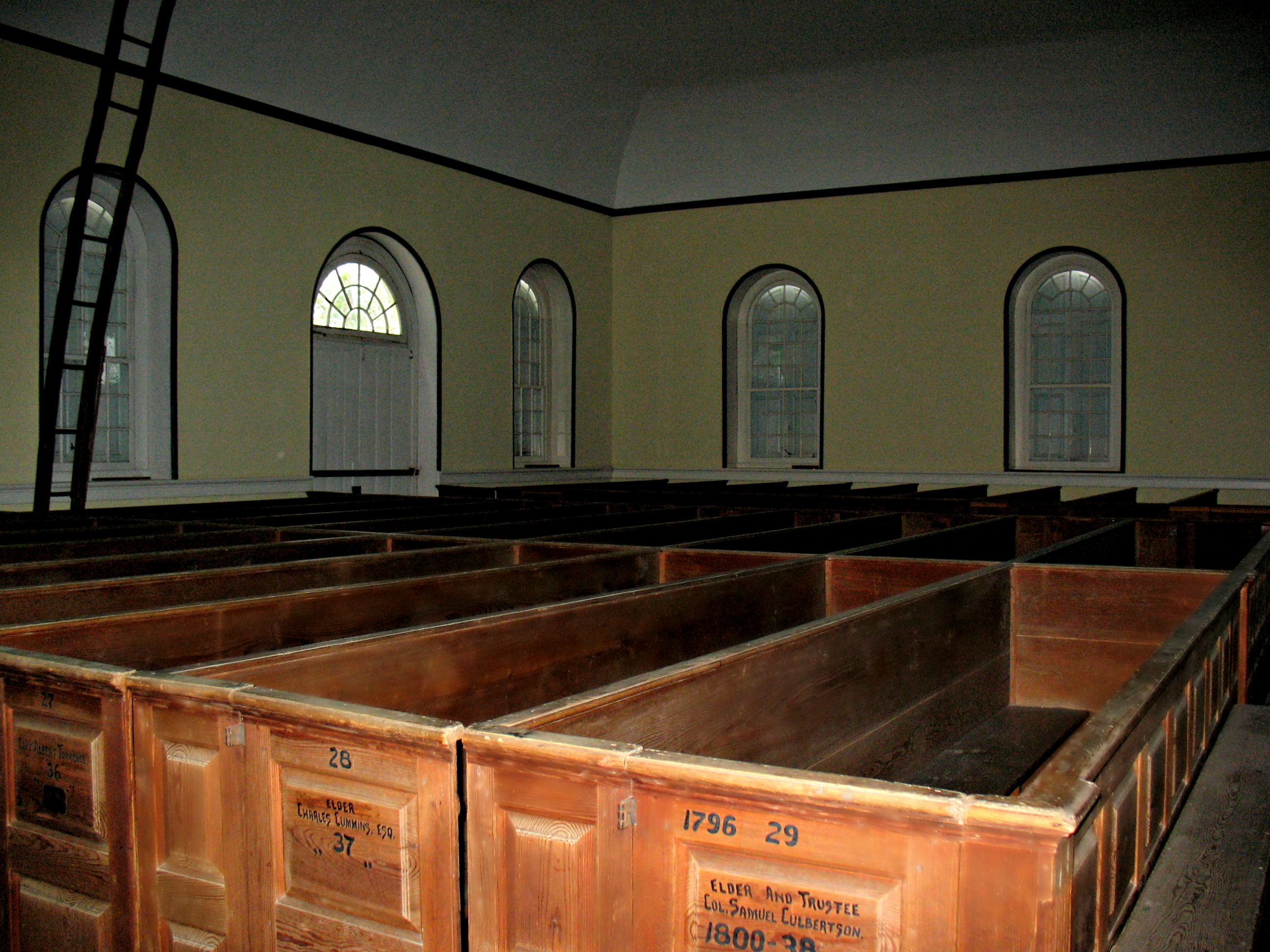
Straight-backed, carved, pews and crude ladder to loft

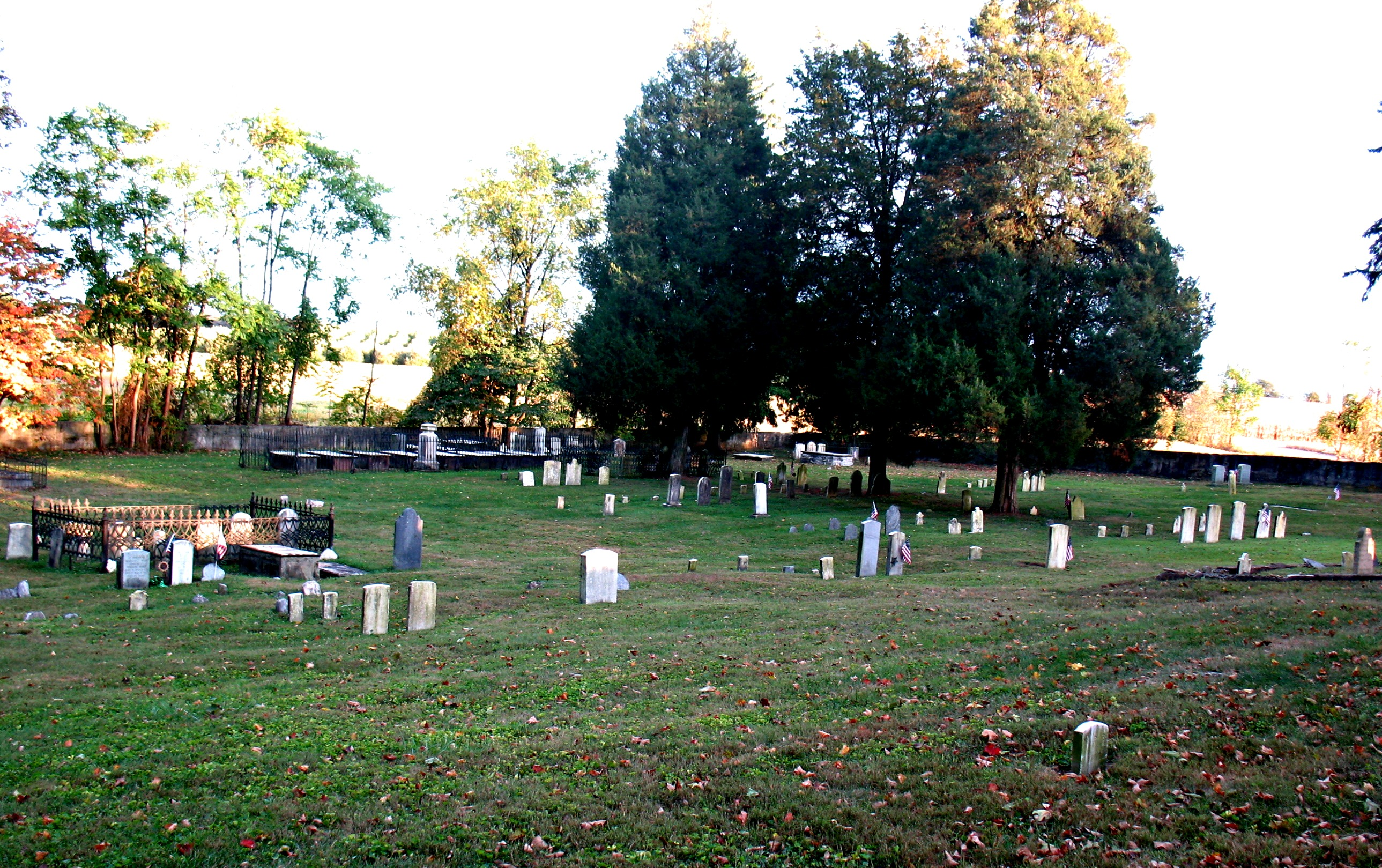
Church cemetery
