= Augusta Huiell Seaman =

American novelist

Augusta Huiell Seaman (April 3, 1879 – June 5, 1950) was an American author of children's literature.

Augusta Huiell Seaman was born Augusta Curtiss Huiell in New York City, on April 3, 1879. She graduated from Normal College (later renamed Hunter College) in New York City in 1900 and went on to teach elementary school. She married Robert Seaman in 1906. Following her marriage, she devoted her time to writing. Her career writing mysteries for children began with the publication of The Boarded-Up House which ran serially in St. Nicholas Magazine in 1914.

Her only child, Helen Roberta (Bobbie) was born in 1915. Her husband Robert died in 1927. In 1928 she married her second husband, Francis Parkman Freeman, foreman of the Phipps estate in Island Beach, New Jersey (now part of Berkeley Township, the setting for several of her later books). While living in Island Beach, Augusta held various offices in the local government, including Borough clerk, Tax Collector, and Borough Registrar.

Over her career Seaman wrote and published over forty books for young people. She died at age seventy-one and is interred at Rosedale Cemetery in Orange, New Jersey.

== Books ==
A few of Seaman's books have been reprinted, but many remain out of print. The rarest of her books are much sought after by collectors. Several of her novels were translated into Norwegian, Danish, and French.

- Jacqueline of the Carrier Pigeons (1910)
- When a Cobbler Ruled a King (1911) [copyright expired]
- Little Mamselle of the Wilderness (1913) [copyright expired]
- The Boarded-Up House (1915) [copyright expired]
- The Sapphire Signet (1916) [copyright expired]
- The Girl Next Door (1917) [copyright expired]
- Three Sides of Paradise Green (1918) [copyright expired]
- Melissa-Across-the-Fence (1918) [copyright expired]
- The Slipper Point Mystery (1919) [copyright expired]
- Americans All; Stories to Tell Boys and Girls of Ten to Twelve (1919) [copyright expired]
- The Crimson Patch (1920) [copyright expired]
- The Dragon's Secret (1921) [copyright expired]
- The Mystery at Number Six (1922) [copyright expired]
- Tranquility House (1923)
- Sally Simms Adventures It (1924)
- The Edge of Raven Pool (1924)
- Bluebonnet Bend (1924)
- The Secret of Tate's Beach (1926)
- The Adventure of the Seven Keyholes (1926)
- The Shadow on the Dial (1927)
- The Disappearance of Anne Shaw (1928)
- A Book of Mysteries: Three Baffling Tales (1929)
- The Charlemonte Crest: A Mystery of Modern Haiti (1930)
- The Brass Keys of Kenwick (1931)
- The House in Hidden Lane: Two Mysteries for Younger Girls (1931)
- The Stars of Sabra (1932)
- The Inn Of The Twin Anchors (1932) -reprinted as The Mystery of the Old Violin
- The Mystery of the Empty Room (1933)
- Bitsy Finds the Clue: A Mystery of Williamsburg, Old and New (1934)
- The Riddle at Live Oaks (1934)
- The Figurehead of the 'Folly' (1935)
- The Strange Pettingill Puzzle: Two Mysteries for Boys and Girls (1936)
- Voice in the Dark (1937) [copyright was not renewed]
- The Pine Barrens Mystery (1937)
- The Vanderlyn Silhouette (1938) [copyright was not renewed]
- The Mystery at Linden Hall (1939) [copyright was not renewed]
- The Curious Affair at Heron Shoals (1940) [copyright was not renewed]
- The Missing Half (1941) [copyright was not renewed]
- The Case of the Calico Crab (1942)
- The Mystery of the Folding Key (1943) [copyright was not renewed]
- The Half-Penny Adventure (1945)
- The Mystery of the Other House (1947)
- The Vanishing Octant Mystery (1949)
