= Tices Shoal =

Shoal in Ocean County, New Jersey, United States

Tices Shoal is a shoal located in Barnegat Bay near Island Beach State Park, in Lacey Township, Ocean County, New Jersey, United States. However the name is also used to describe a location commonly used by boats and other water craft slightly to the east. There is foot access to the main road of Island Beach State Park located at 39.833716°N 74.091501°W. This connects the boat anchorage to the beaches of the park. In the summer of 2015, a fee was added to walk from the anchorage to Island Beach State Park while lifeguards are on duty.
