= Island Beach, New Jersey =

Coordinates: 39.8434°N 74.0887°W

- Borough
- Interactive map of Island Beach, New Jersey
- Country: United States
- State: New Jersey
- County: Ocean
- Incorporated: June 23, 1933
- Dissolution: July 6, 1965

Government
  - Type: Borough

Population (1940)
  - Total: 31 (peak)

Island Beach was a borough that existed in Ocean County, New Jersey, United States, from 1933 to 1965.

Island Beach was incorporated as a borough by an Act of the New Jersey Legislature on June 23, 1933, from portions of Berkeley Township, Lacey Township and Ocean Township. The referendum that approved the borough's formation was passed on August 18, 1933. Most of the land that made up the new borough — 2,694 acres (10.90 km^{2}) worth — had been purchased by Henry Phipps, a partner of Andrew Carnegie, in 1926. Phipps had hired Francis Parkman Freeman to act as foreman of the Island Beach estate, and Freeman and his wife Augusta Huiell Seaman shared the various local government positions between them.

Historical population
Census	Pop.	Note	%±
1940	31		—
1950	13		−58.1%
1960	11		−15.4%
Population sources: 1940-1960

The population reached a peak of 31 in the 1940 Census, and following a government-ordered evacuation during World War II for work on Operation Bumblebee, the population had dropped off to 13 by 1950 and was down to 11 in the 1960 tally, the last before the borough was disincorporated.

The borough lasted until July 6, 1965, when it was absorbed into Berkeley Township. The territory now comprises Island Beach State Park.

== Notable residents ==
- Augusta Huiell Seaman (1879–1950), author of children's literature.
