= Popcorn Park Animal Refuge =

Nonprofit animal sanctuary in New Jersey

- Interactive map of Popcorn Park Animal Refuge
- 39.910°N 74.327°W
- Date opened: 1977
- Location: Lacey Township, Forked River, New Jersey
- Land area: 7 acres (2.8 ha)
- No. of animals: 200
- Website: www.ahscares.org

Popcorn Park Animal Refuge is a small non-profit 7-acre (2.8 ha) animal refuge and sanctuary located in Forked River, New Jersey, within Lacey Township. According to the Associated Humane Societies, the refuge is "a sanctuary for abandoned, injured, ill, exploited, abused or elderly wildlife, exotic and farm animals, and birds." The refuge has programs to educate visitors about animals and their environments and offers hundreds of rescued dogs and cats for adoption, in their separate adoption building. The name "Popcorn Park" was adopted due to the small fee visitors pay to the entrance which grants them entry. No feeding of the animals is allowed since 2022.

== History ==
Popcorn Park Animal Refuge was established in 1977 as a wildlife refuge for exotic and farm animals that were abused, ill, injured, handicapped, elderly, or exploited. The refuge first came to be because of an injured raccoon. Through the years, this non-profit organization has taken care of thousands of domestic and exotic animals thanks to the donations of individuals who want to contribute to the continued success of this refuge. The refuge was once home to a large elephant which was rescued from a zoo in Mexico. Upon the elephant passing, her enclosure became home to several llamas who enjoy the open space.

== Attractions ==
Popcorn Park Animal Refuge has over 200 animals including Bengal tigers, Siberian tigers, African lions, cougars, American black bears, an Arabian camel from the Rough Point estate of Doris Duke, and numerous species of monkeys, (including four baboons) foxes, and white-tailed deer.

Princess, the camel, died February 2, 2014.

== Attack ==
Park animals suffered an attack in May 2003, when three teenagers, all 18 years old, killed three ducks, three emus and two rheas. The teens were arraigned and held on $50,000 bail a week later. Strong measures to protect all of the animals were already in place, but after the attack the animals received even stronger means of protection from anyone who would wish to harm them. The sanctuary is now equipped with an alarm system which surrounds the entire perimeter, including a camera system to protect the animal after the zoo closes each night. Cymbals Eat Guitars, an American rock band, reference the attack on their 2014 track "2 Hip Soul".
