= John Lacey (general) =

- Born: February 4, 1755
- Died: February 17, 1814 (aged 59)
- Military career
- Branch: Brigadier General
- Conflicts: American Revolutionary War

John Lacey (February 4, 1755 – February 17, 1814) was an American military officer during the American Revolutionary War. He was appointed a brigadier general in the Pennsylvania militia by the Pennsylvania Supreme Executive Council in January 1778.

A native of Buckingham Township in Bucks County, Pennsylvania, Lacey was a member of local militia unit which was incorporated into the Pennsylvania Line of the Continental Army. He served as a captain under Colonel Anthony Wayne on the Canadian frontier in 1776, but he and Wayne got along poorly and Lacey resigned his commission and went home. In 1777, he served as a lieutenant colonel in a Bucks County Regiment of militia, during which he fought at Germantown, and Matson's Ford. He gained such a reputation for skill and courage that Pennsylvania Supreme Executive made him a Brigadier General in the Pennsylvania Militia on January 9, 1778. He commanded the American forces in the Battle of Crooked Billet.

He was 59 years old when he died. Later, several communities were named in his honor, including Lacey Park, Pennsylvania and Lacey Township, New Jersey.

The Gen. John Lacey Homestead was added to the National Register of Historic Places in 1980.

Preceded by Joseph Hart	Member, Supreme Executive Council of Pennsylvania, representing Bucks County; 28 October 1779—29 October 1782	Succeeded by George Wall Jr.
