= Island Beach State Park =

State park in New Jersey, United States

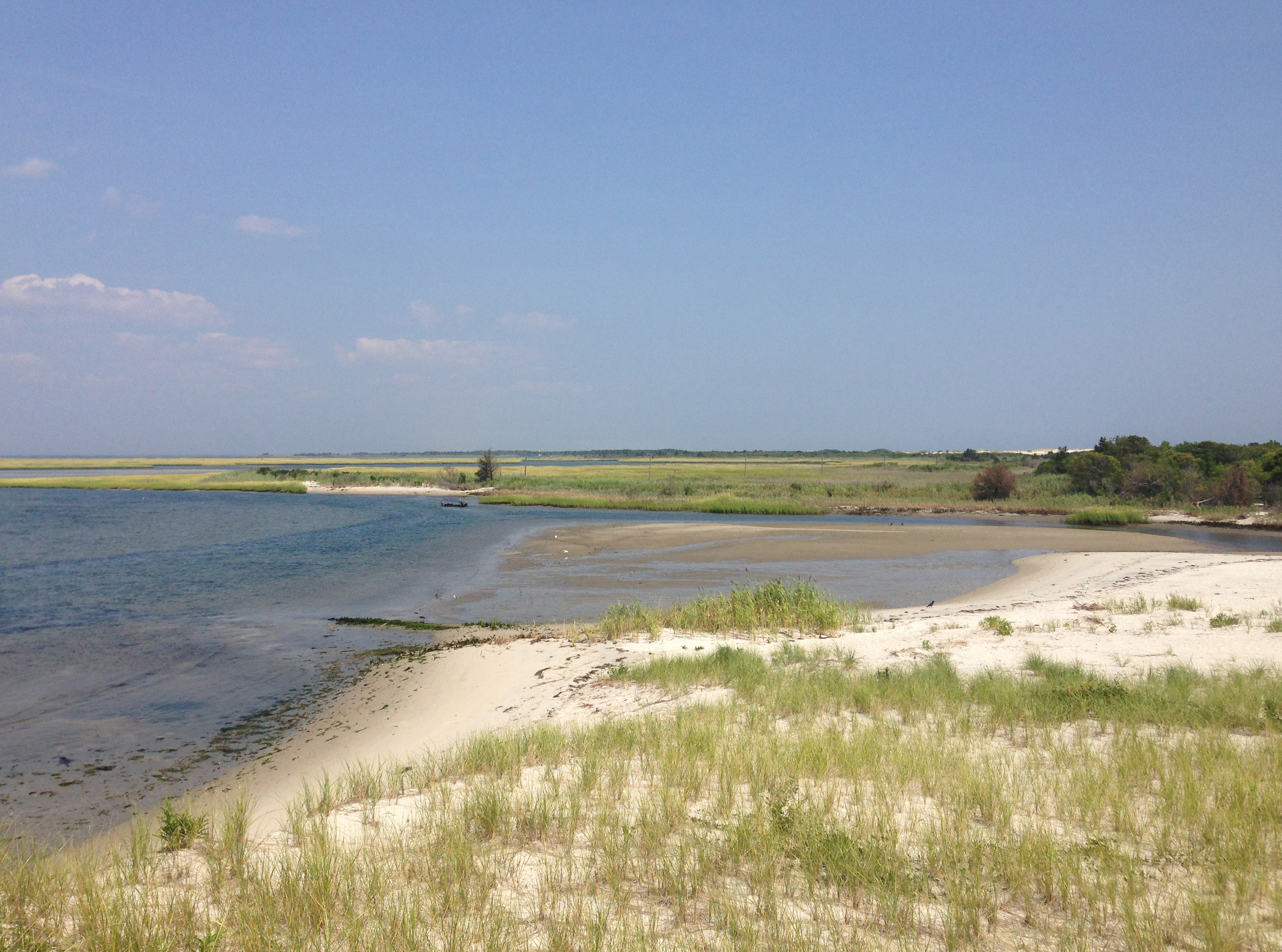
- Wetlands along Barnegat Bay near the southern end of Island Beach State Park

- Location within New Jersey Location within the United States
- Location: Berkeley Township, New Jersey
- Nearest city: Seaside Park, New Jersey
- Coordinates: 39°54′19″N 74°04′53″W
- Area: 3,003 acres (1,215 ha)
- Established: 1953
- Administrator: New Jersey Division of Parks and Forestry
- Website: Official website

Island Beach State Park is a New Jersey state park located just south of Seaside Park on the Barnegat Peninsula in Berkeley Township, Ocean County, New Jersey, United States. The park is operated and maintained by the New Jersey Division of Parks and Forestry. Most of the park encompasses the former borough of Island Beach.

The park is the largest reserve of undeveloped barrier island in New Jersey and one of the largest in the United States. The park is divided into two areas. The Island Beach Northern Natural Area covers 659 acres (2.7 km^{2}), some of which is restricted to the public. The Southern Natural Area is much larger at 1,237 acres (5 km^{2}). The park includes the Sedge Island Marine Conservation Zone, which includes about 1,600 acres (6 km^{2}) of tidal marshes, creeks, ponds, and open water.

Coming in from the sea-front, a visitor ascends over a large primary dune covered in tall grasses and down into a narrow maritime forest, consisting of many tall bushes and short trees including holly, goldenrod and black cherry. Approaching the bay side, one finds reeds and a muddy estuary that is home to blue crabs and herons and other marine birds. The park is an excellent site for bird watching with osprey nests and bird blinds set up. The Barnegat Inlet is located at the southern tip of the park, separating the Barnegat Peninsula from Long Beach Island.

Swimming, kayaking, and fishing are permitted in some areas of the park. Four wheel drive vehicles are permitted onto the beach with a permit.

== Flora ==
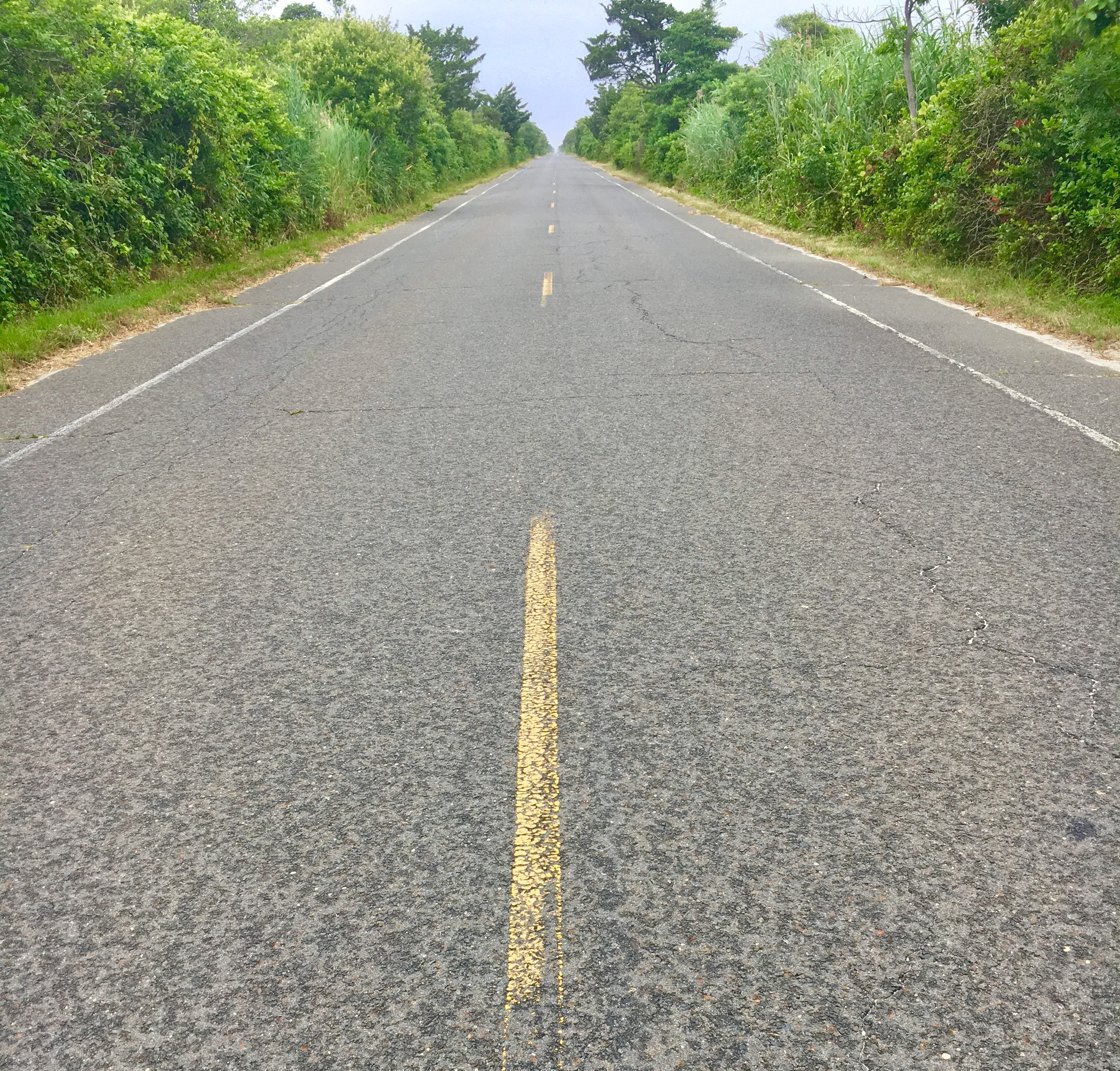
Typical flora of Island Beach State Park, as seen along Shore Road, the main road through the park.

Among the trees found in the park are Eastern Redcedar (Juniperus virginiana), Pitch Pine (Pinus rigida), American Holly (Ilex opaca), Black Cherry (Prunus serotina), Serviceberry (Amelanchier canadensis), Persimmon (Diospyros virginiana), Atlantic White Cedar (Chamaecyparis thyoides) and Sweetbay (Magnolia virginiana). These trees appear in different areas of the park, depending on the specifics of salt and wind exposure. They are often stunted, compared to inland examples of their species, and display the "salt spray horizon" effect, with the side facing the ocean sheared tightly by the environment, with their westerly sides tending to grow taller. Thus, the trees and shrubs often take on wedge-like shapes with their low side on the east.

Shrubs in the park include Bayberry (Myrica pensylvanica and Myrica cerifera), Highbush blueberry (Vaccinium corymbosum), Beach plum (Prunus maritima), Swamp azalea (Rhododendron viscosum), Red and Black Chokeberry (Aronia arbutifolia and Aronia melanocarpa), Heather (Hudsonia ericoides) and Sweet Pepperbush (Clethra alnifolia). Every September the park hosts a Beach Plum Festival, replete with tours, foods and music.

There are also many grasses, forbs and herbaceous plants.

Many of these plants can be seen at the nature center, 1 mile (1.6 km) into the park, in a display garden, which is located by a freshwater wetland.

== Attractions ==
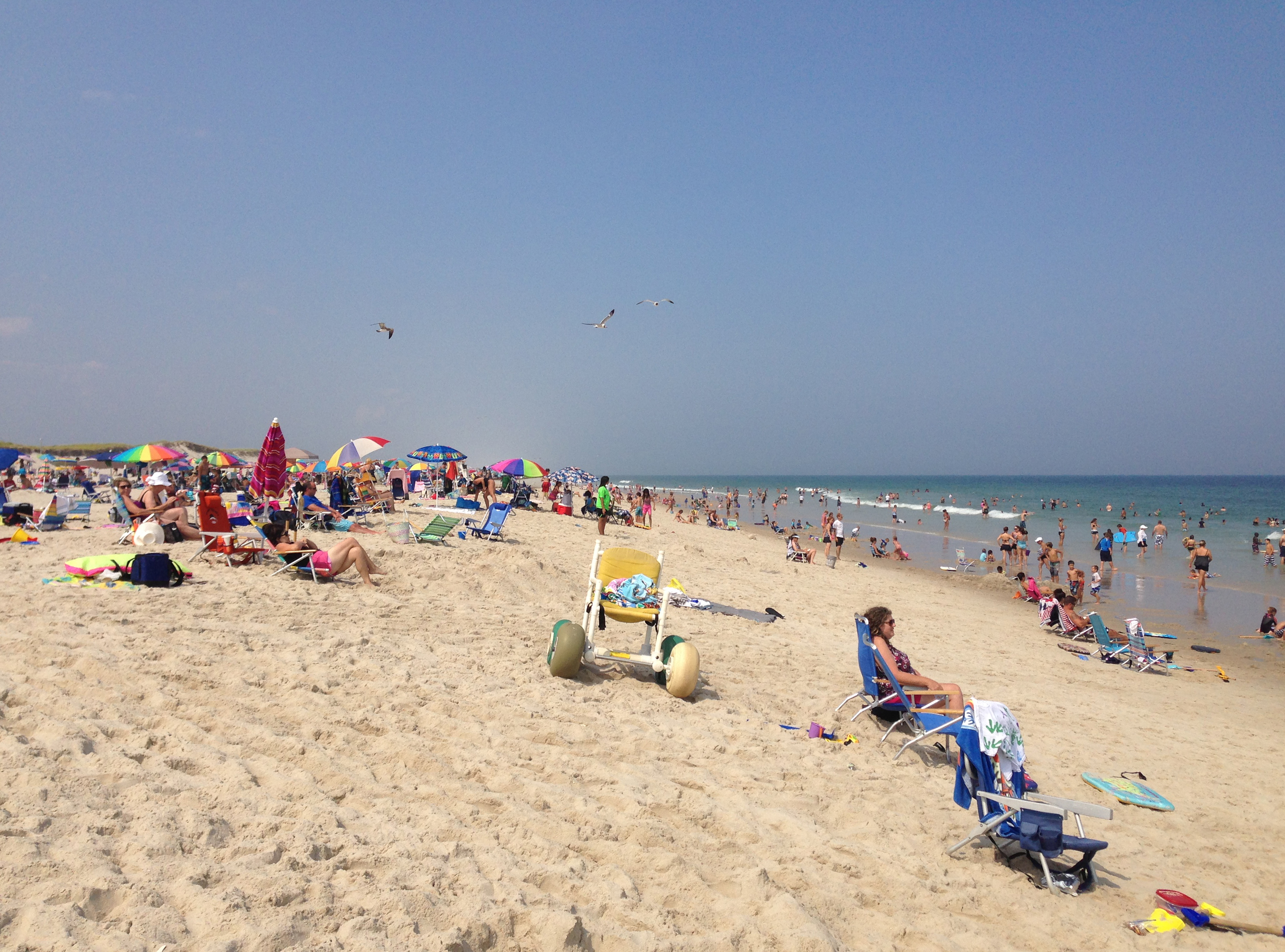
Bathing beach at Island Beach State Park on a sunny summer day

Most visitors come for the white sand beach, the ocean waters, and natural backdrop, in contrast to the developed and boardwalk-lined beaches to the north and south. Island Beach State Park encompasses many miles of beach; the northernmost have life guards. People can swim, surf, fish, and kayak in the park. The park also allows dune buggy access in the southern portion of the park. There is also a boardwalk extending from Barnegat Bay to the main road allowing boaters access to the beach. On the bayside of Island Beach State Park is an area called Tices Shoal, where boaters gather together and anchor.

== Governor’s Ocean Residence ==
Since New Jersey acquired the 2,694 acres (10.90 km^{2}) estate of Henry Phipps, Jr. in 1953 for $2.75 million to form the park, the state has maintained an official vacation residence (39.8865°N 74.0819°W) exclusively for the New Jersey Governor (in addition to the governor's mansion at Drumthwacket, in Princeton near the state capital of Trenton). The residence was built by Phipps in the 1920s.

The house is in the Cape Cod style. It is now accessible via a paved road. The home is about 200 feet (61 m) from the beach. It has five bedrooms and three bathrooms with a small room for the security detail. It is the only house close to the ocean. Two other houses in the park are on Barnegat Bay (one for the superintendent of the park and a governor's guest house).

In addition to the governors, guests at the house have included Lady Bird Johnson; the daughter of Alexei Kosygin; Hubert Humphrey; Walter Mondale; and Joe Biden.

In July 2017 during the long July 4th holiday extended weekend the park along with other parks were closed because the state had not approved its budget. Governor Chris Christie, wife, children and friends were photographed on a deserted beach at the park. Christie took a helicopter back and forth to Trenton during the budget discussions.

New Jersey is one of just four states to maintain a state-owned vacation home for its governor. Other states with vacation residence are Alabama at Fort Morgan, Michigan at Mackinac Island and North Carolina at Asheville.

== Climate ==
According to the Köppen climate classification system, Island Beach State Park has a humid subtropical climate (Cfa). Cfa climates are characterized by all months having an average temperature > 32.0 °F (0.0 °C), at least four months with an average temperature ≥ 50.0 °F (10.0 °C), at least one month with an average temperature ≥ 71.6 °F (22.0 °C) and no significant precipitation difference between seasons. Although most summer days are slightly humid with a cooling afternoon sea breeze in Island Beach State Park, episodes of heat and high humidity can occur with heat index values > 104 °F (40 °C). Since 1981, the highest air temperature was 99.5 °F (37.5 °C) on July 5, 1999 and the highest daily average mean dew point was 77.2 °F (25.1 °C) on August 13, 2016. July is the peak in thunderstorm activity and the average wettest month is August. Since 1981, the wettest calendar day was 6.70 inches (170 mm) on August 12, 2013. During the winter months, the average annual extreme minimum air temperature is 3.7 °F (−15.7 °C). Since 1981, the coldest air temperature was −4.2 °F (−20.1 °C) on January 18, 1982. Episodes of extreme cold and wind can occur with wind chill values < −6 °F (−21 °C). The average seasonal (Nov-Apr) snowfall total is between 12 inches (30 cm) and 18 inches (46 cm), and the average snowiest month is February which corresponds with the annual peak in nor'easter activity.

Climate data for Island Beach State Park, 1981-2010 normals, extremes 1981-2019
Month	Jan	Feb	Mar	Apr	May	Jun	Jul	Aug	Sep	Oct	Nov	Dec	Year
Record high °F (°C)	70.5 (21.4)	77.5 (25.3)	83.3 (28.5)	87.9 (31.1)	94.6 (34.8)	97.2 (36.2)	99.5 (37.5)	98.9 (37.2)	97.0 (36.1)	91.9 (33.3)	79.2 (26.2)	73.9 (23.3)	99.5 (37.5)
Mean daily maximum °F (°C)	40.2 (4.6)	42.6 (5.9)	49.3 (9.6)	58.6 (14.8)	68.5 (20.3)	77.8 (25.4)	82.9 (28.3)	81.9 (27.7)	76.0 (24.4)	65.3 (18.5)	55.2 (12.9)	45.4 (7.4)	62.1 (16.7)
Daily mean °F (°C)	32.9 (0.5)	34.9 (1.6)	41.3 (5.2)	50.4 (10.2)	60.3 (15.7)	69.7 (20.9)	75.0 (23.9)	74.1 (23.4)	67.6 (19.8)	56.5 (13.6)	47.2 (8.4)	37.8 (3.2)	54.1 (12.3)
Mean daily minimum °F (°C)	25.6 (−3.6)	27.2 (−2.7)	33.3 (0.7)	42.2 (5.7)	52.0 (11.1)	61.7 (16.5)	67.2 (19.6)	66.2 (19.0)	59.3 (15.2)	47.7 (8.7)	39.3 (4.1)	30.1 (−1.1)	46.1 (7.8)
Record low °F (°C)	−4.2 (−20.1)	−0.2 (−17.9)	7.5 (−13.6)	18.7 (−7.4)	37.4 (3.0)	45.4 (7.4)	50.9 (10.5)	46.4 (8.0)	41.8 (5.4)	29.3 (−1.5)	16.9 (−8.4)	0.9 (−17.3)	−4.2 (−20.1)
Average precipitation inches (mm)	3.62 (92)	3.03 (77)	4.27 (108)	3.85 (98)	3.50 (89)	3.56 (90)	4.40 (112)	4.47 (114)	3.49 (89)	3.70 (94)	3.70 (94)	3.87 (98)	45.46 (1,155)
Average relative humidity (%)	66.0	63.9	62.1	63.3	66.0	70.8	70.1	71.8	71.1	69.9	68.9	66.7	67.6
Average dew point °F (°C)	22.8 (−5.1)	23.9 (−4.5)	29.3 (−1.5)	38.4 (3.6)	48.9 (9.4)	59.8 (15.4)	64.6 (18.1)	64.4 (18.0)	57.9 (14.4)	46.8 (8.2)	37.5 (3.1)	27.7 (−2.4)	43.6 (6.4)
Source: PRISM

Climate data for Atlantic City, NJ Ocean Water Temperature (38 SW Island Beach State Park)
Month	Jan	Feb	Mar	Apr	May	Jun	Jul	Aug	Sep	Oct	Nov	Dec	Year
Daily mean °F (°C)	37 (3)	35 (2)	42 (6)	48 (9)	56 (13)	63 (17)	70 (21)	73 (23)	70 (21)	61 (16)	53 (12)	44 (7)	54 (12)
Source: NOAA

== Ecology ==
According to the A. W. Kuchler U.S. potential natural vegetation types, Island Beach State Park would have a dominant vegetation type of Northern Cordgrass (73) with a dominant vegetation form of Coastal Prairie (20). The plant hardiness zone is 7a with an average annual extreme minimum air temperature of 3.7 °F (−15.7 °C). The average date of first spring leaf-out is March 23 and fall color typically peaks in early-November.

To the North: Seaside Park	Beaches of New Jersey	To the South; Barnegat Light
