= Barnegat Branch Trail =

Rail trail in Ocean County, New Jersey, U.S.

Coordinates: 39.757879°N 74.238567°W

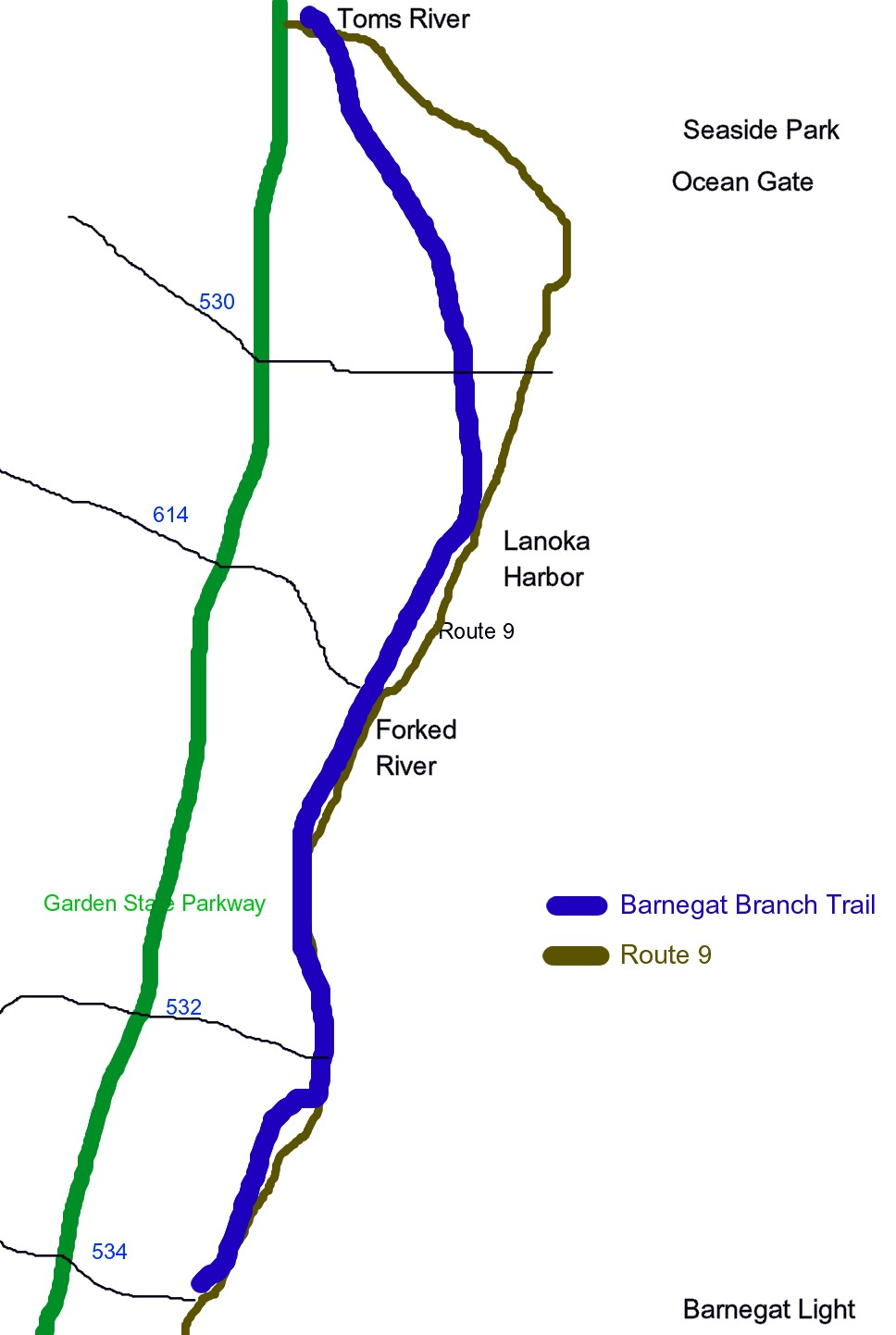
Barnegat Branch Rail-Trail.

The Barnegat Branch Trail is a rail trail in Ocean County, New Jersey.

The trail occupies a 15.6-mile (25.1 km) abandoned rail corridor in Ocean County, New Jersey, that extends from Barnegat Township to Toms River. The trail was built on the former Barnegat Branch Division roadbed of the Central Railroad of New Jersey (CNJ). The bankrupt CNJ was absorbed into Conrail in 1976, who terminated freight service the following year.

== Controversy ==
A 1.9-mile (3.1 km) segment of the trail right-of-way has been the focus of an ongoing battle to build a bypass road for Route 9. Lacey Township officials are proposing a shared road-walkway for this section of the trail. After legal battle, it was ruled that the town could use the trail for a roadway.
