= Ocean County Airport =

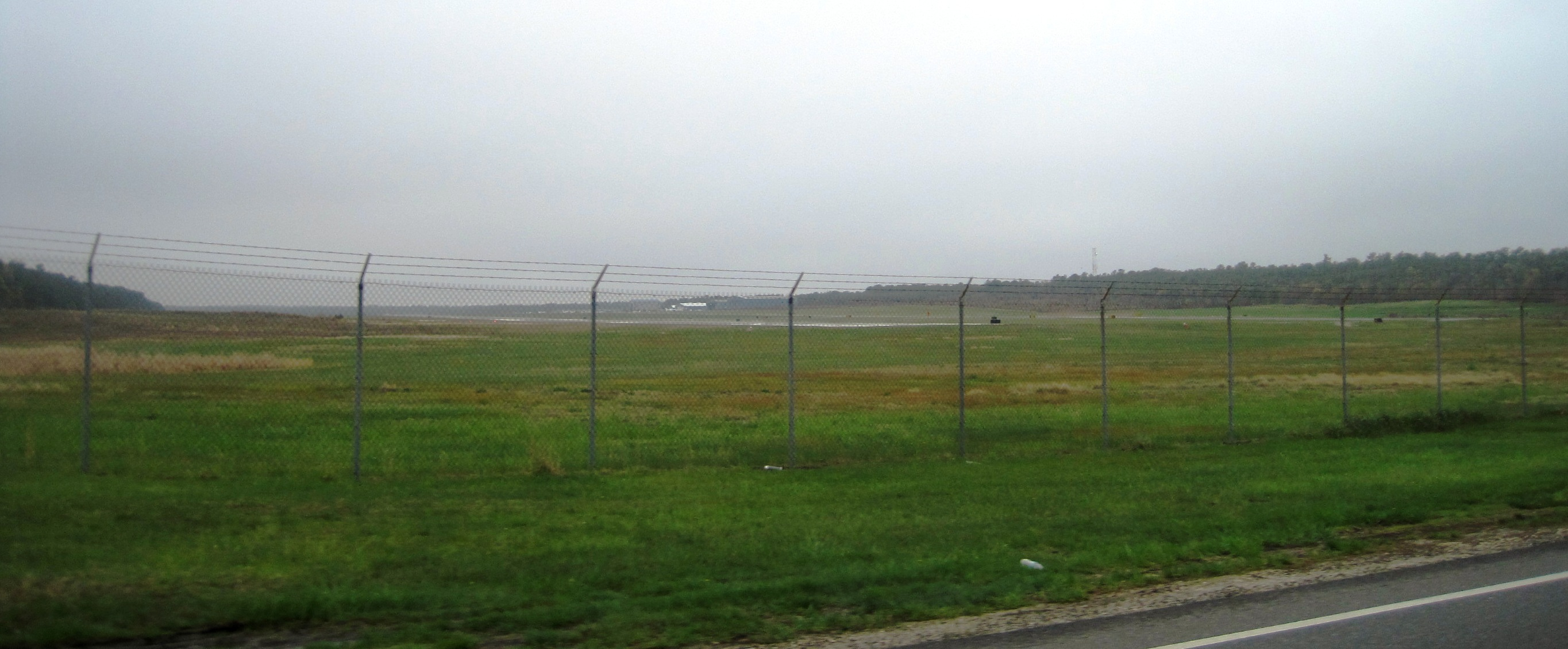
- Airport as seen from CR 530
- IATA: MJX; ICAO: KMJX; FAA LID: MJX

Summary
- Airport type: Public
- Owner: County of Ocean
- Serves: Ocean County
- Location: Berkeley Township and Lacey Township, Ocean County, New Jersey
- Opened: 1968
- Elevation AMSL: 86 ft / 26 m
- Coordinates: 39°55′39″N 074°17′33″W
- Website: Ocean County Airport

Map
- Interactive map of Ocean County Airport

Runways
Direction	Length		Surface
Direction	ft	m	Surface
6/24	5,950	1,814	Asphalt
14/32	3,599	1,097	Asphalt

Helipads
Number	Length		Surface
Number	ft	m	Surface
H1	100	30	Asphalt

Statistics (2022)
- Aircraft operations (year ending 10/31/2022): 38,550
- Based aircraft: 64
- Source: Federal Aviation Administration

Ocean County Airport, also known as Robert J. Miller Air Park (IATA: MJX, ICAO: KMJX, FAA LID: MJX), is a county-owned public-use airport that straddles the border of Berkeley Township and Lacey Township in Ocean County, New Jersey, United States. It is located five nautical miles (6 mi, 9 km) southwest of the central business district of Toms River, New Jersey.

Opened in 1968 as the Ocean County Air-Park, the airport was renamed in 1970 to honor Ocean County Freeholder Robert J. Miller, who was instrumental in the airport's development. Miller died in an accident at the airport in 1969.

The airport is included in the FAA's National Plan of Integrated Airport Systems for 2011–2015, which categorized it as a general aviation facility.

== Facilities and aircraft ==
The airport covers 822 acres (333 ha) and is situated at an elevation of 86 feet (26 m). It features:

- Runway 6/24: 5,950 x 100 ft (1,814 x 30 m), asphalt
- Runway 14/32: 3,599 x 75 ft (1,097 x 23 m), asphalt
- Helipad H1: 100 x 100 ft (30 x 30 m), asphalt

For the 12-month period ending October 31, 2022, the airport had 38,550 aircraft operations, an average of 106 per day. At that time, there were 64 aircraft based at this airport: 53 single-engine, 8 multi-engine, 1 jet, and 2 helicopters.

On-site tenants include the New Jersey Forest Fire Service, the Civil Air Patrol, and emergency medevac providers like Hackensack AirMed One.

Experimental Aircraft Association Chapter 898 is based at Ocean County Airport. In addition to providing Young Eagles flights, education programs, and aircraft-building workshops, the chapter members assembled The Impossible Airplane, a custom RV-10 designed for armless airplane pilot Jessica Cox to fly using only her feet.

== Recent developments ==
In 2014, Runway 14/32 was completed to provide a safe crosswind option, marking the first new runway built in New Jersey since 1983. The $8.2 million project was primarily funded by the FAA.

In 2020, a $2.8 million T-hangar construction contract was awarded, adding new units for helicopters and small aircraft.

In 2021, the airport secured $1.45 million in federal infrastructure funding for apron and taxiway improvements to accommodate growing demand.

== See also ==
- List of airports in New Jersey
