= Toms River Railroad =

Railroad in Ocean County, New Jersey

Map

The Toms River Railroad was a railroad in Ocean County, New Jersey, established in 1866 with a stop at the county seat of Toms River, New Jersey. The line was extended to Waretown in 1872 by the Toms River & Waretown Railroad. In 1881 the Central Railroad of New Jersey (CNJ) purchased the line and in 1893 the property was transferred to the Toms River & Barnegat Railroad (TR&B) at that time the branch was extended to Barnegat. In 1893, TR&B acquired ownership of the property, and service continued under CNJ.

Passenger service was terminated in the mid-1950s. Freight service continued into the late 1970s: by that time CNJ was bankrupt and had been absorbed by Conrail who abandoned the line in 1981. The former roadbed was converted for rail trail use in 2007 as the Barnegat Branch Trail.
