= Battle of Crooked Billet =

- Part of the American Revolutionary War
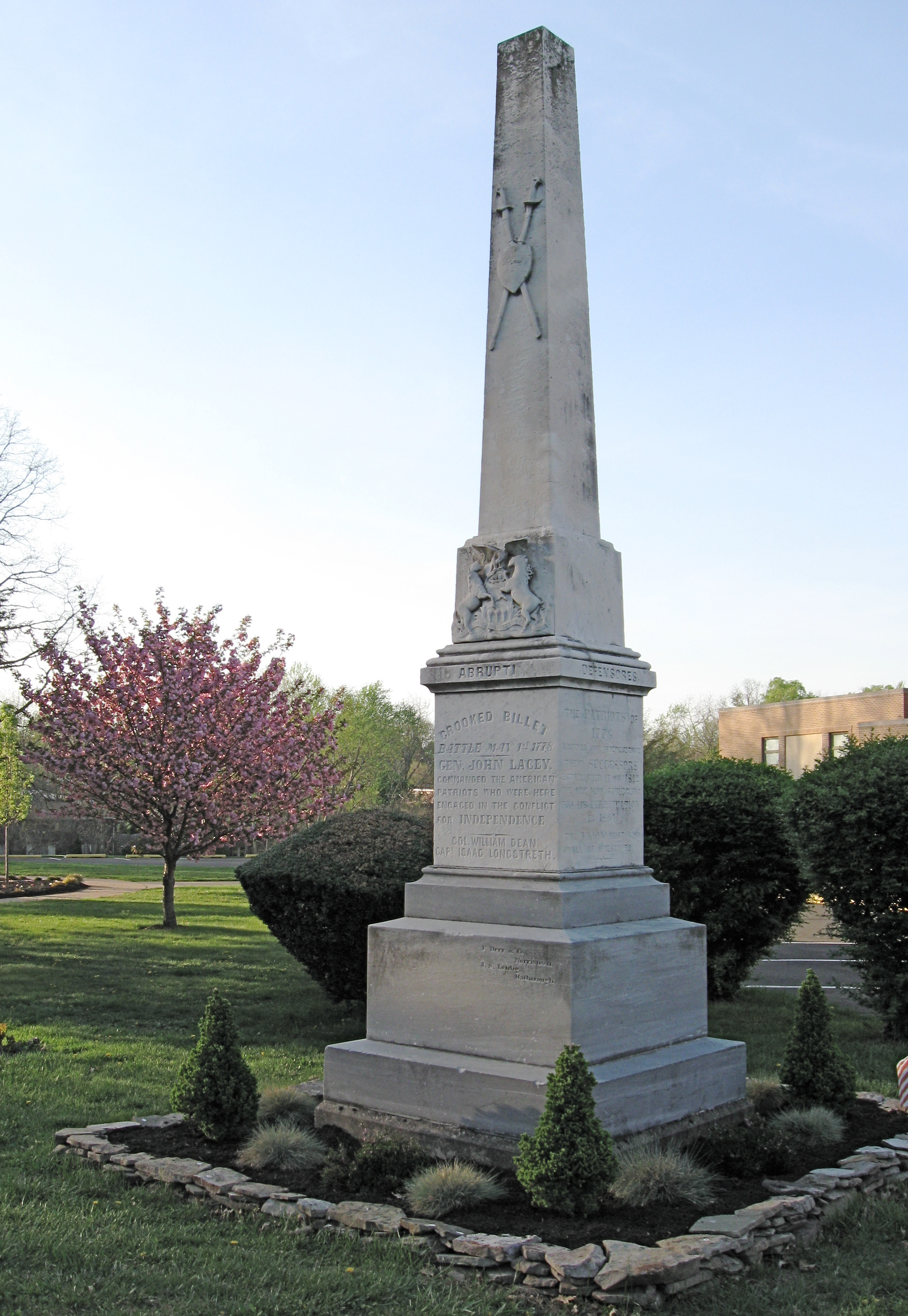
- Battle of Crooked Billet monument
Date	May 1, 1778
Location	Crooked Billet Tavern (Present-day Hatboro, Pennsylvania)
Result	British victory

Belligerents
United States; Pennsylvania militia	Great Britain

Commanders and leaders
John Lacey	(Kingdom of Great Britain) John Graves Simcoe (Kingdom of Great Britain) Robert Abercromby

Strength
300–500	850

Casualties and losses
26 killed 8 wounded 58 captured	7 wounded

Battle of Crooked Billet
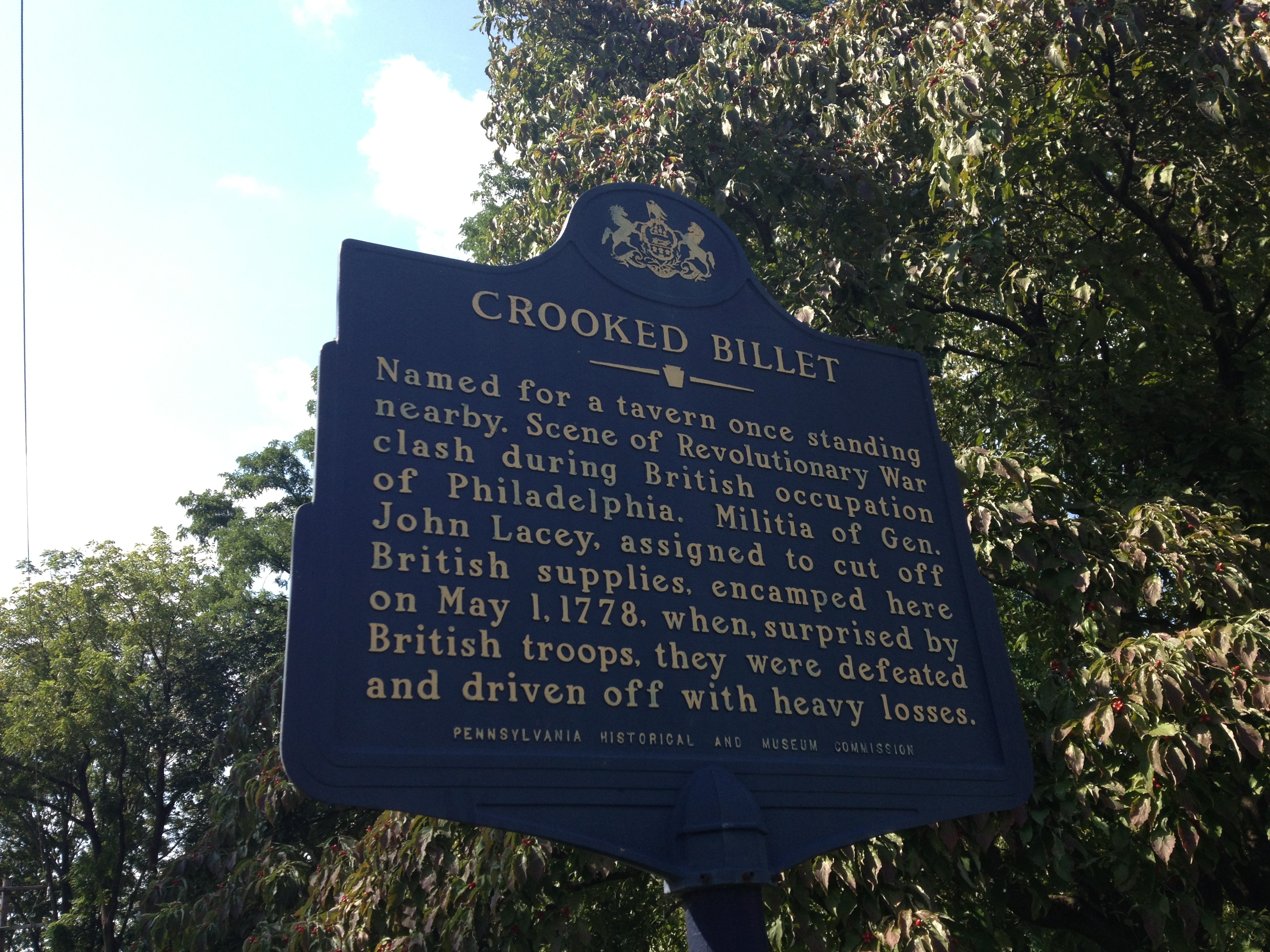
- Pennsylvania historical marker commemorating the Battle of Crooked Billet

- Location within Pennsylvania
- 40.18405°N 75.10043°W

Pennsylvania Historical Marker
- Official name: Crooked Billet
- Type: Roadside
- Designated: May 01, 1965
- Location: Meadowbrook Ave. near N Penn Ave. at Crooked Billet Elem. School, Hatboro

The Battle of Crooked Billet was a battle in the Philadelphia campaign of the American Revolutionary War fought on May 1, 1778 near the Crooked Billet Tavern in Moreland Township, Philadelphia County, Pennsylvania (present-day Hatboro, Pennsylvania, now in Montgomery County). In the skirmish action, British forces under the command of Major John Graves Simcoe launched a surprise attack against Brigadier General John Lacey and three regiments of Pennsylvania militia, who were caught sleeping. The British inflicted significant damage, and Lacey and his forces were forced to retreat into neighboring Warminster, Bucks County.

== Background ==
The British Army, led by General William Howe, had captured New York City in 1776 and Philadelphia in 1777. Even after the capture of Forts Mifflin and Mercer, which had previously prevented the resupply of British-occupied Philadelphia by sea, the British relied heavily upon the overland route between New York City and Philadelphia for the movement of men, supplies and communication. British troops also regularly foraged for supplies in the countryside around the city.

Since December, Washington and the Continental Army were in winter quarters at Valley Forge, northwest of Philadelphia. John Lacey (who had been promoted to Brigadier General and commander of the Pennsylvania militia in January at the age of 23), was tasked by Washington with patrolling the region north of Philadelphia, between the Delaware and Schuylkill Rivers. Washington ordered Lacey and the militia to prevent farmers from taking their goods into Philadelphia to sell to the British (who paid high prices, in gold), and to protect patriots in the region from harassment by British and Loyalist troops.

Washington was highly critical of both Pennsylvania's militia recruitment and Lacey's performance. Pennsylvania, despite promising 1,000 militia to patrol that area, had been unable to raise that many, and Washington was considering calling in militia from neighboring states. Washington wrote that militia stipulated by the state had never been above half kept up and that General Lacey had only 70 men left in the field. Lacey had not been as effective as Brigadier General James Potter at interdicting trade with the British, and Washington hoped Potter, off on leave, would soon return.

== Prelude ==
In late April Lacey began a series of maneuvers and patrols across the area that ended with his arrival on April 27 at the Crooked Billet Tavern in present-day Hatboro. One of his straggling companies was attacked by a British patrol, and Loyalist spies informed John Graves Simcoe, leader of the Loyalist Queen's Rangers, of Lacey's whereabouts.

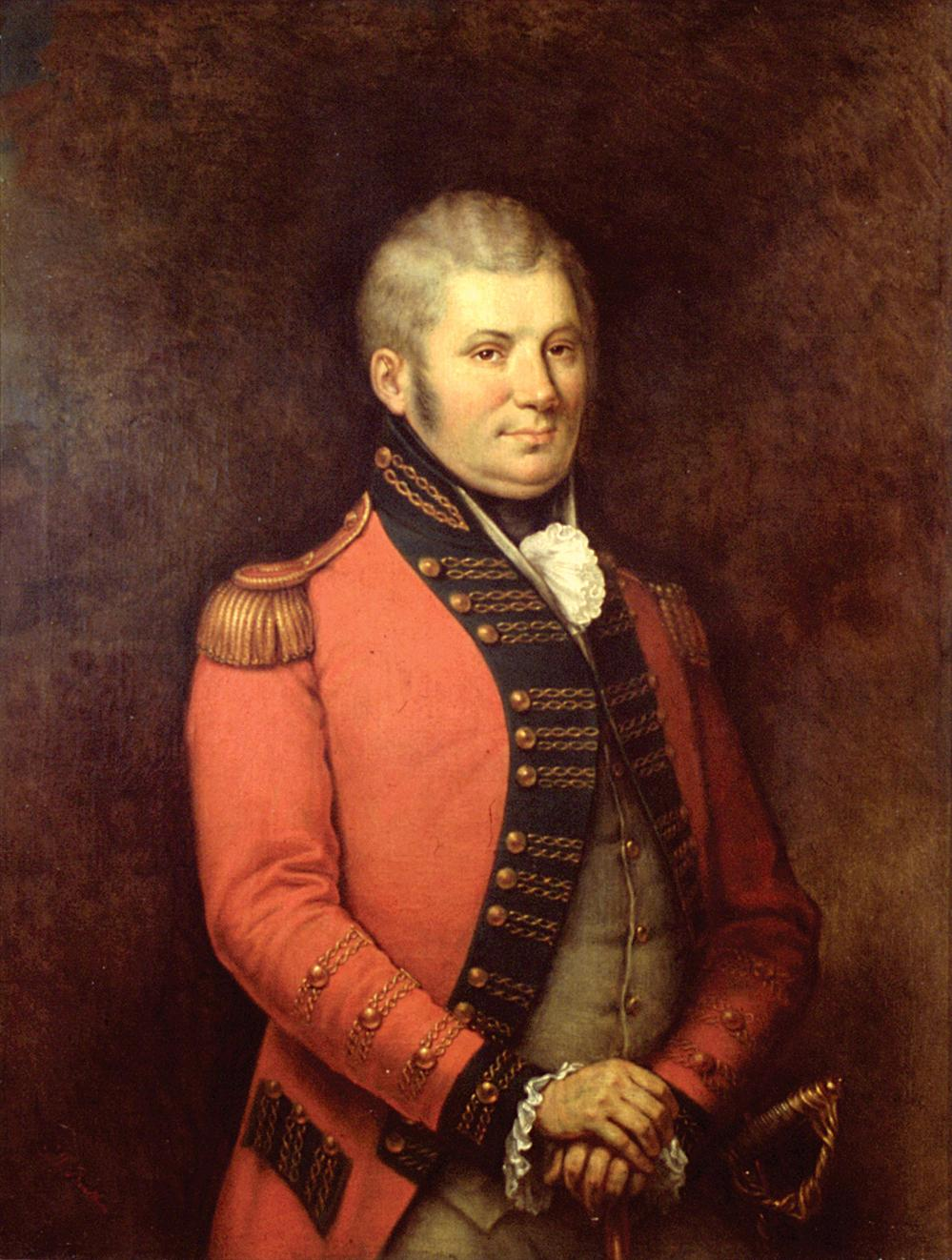
John Graves Simcoe, commander of the Queen's Rangers.

In Philadelphia, General Howe ordered Simcoe, to "secure the country and facilitate the inhabitants bringing in their produce to market." During the winter of 1778, British and Loyalist troops repeatedly led raids into Bucks County, despite the presence of Lacey and the militia.

In April, Simcoe secured permission from Howe to launch an attack on Lacey and his militia. On the afternoon of April 30, he and Lieutenant Colonel Robert Abercromby led their contingent of troops out of Philadelphia and towards the Crooked Billet. By then Lacey's troops numbered about 400, including fresh arrivals from Cumberland and York Counties. That night Lacey ordered Lieutenant William Neilsen to begin a patrol between 2:00 and 3:00 am, and ordered the brigade of Thomas Downey to stand on alert. Neilsen failed to follow his orders, and his patrol only left camp shortly before daybreak on May 1. They had not gone far when they spotted the advancing British.

== Battle ==
The British troops arrived at Crooked Billet at daybreak on May 1. Simcoe had planned a "pincer"-type attack, with his troops attacking from the north and east, and Abercromby's troops from the south and west. Lacey's pickets, in place to warn against any type of threat, noticed the British troops, but failed to fire off a warning shot for fear of being killed or captured. Neilsen sent a runner back to the camp to raise the alarm, but he never arrived. Surprised and outnumbered, the militia were soon routed and forced to retreat into Warminster, losing their supplies and equipment at their bivouac site.

An account of the battle, published on May 5 in Philadelphia's Royal Pennsylvania Gazette, reads as follows:

On Thursday night last, a small party of the British infantry, dragoons, and Queen's rangers, with a few of Capt. HOVEDEN's Pennsylvania, and Capt. JAMES's Chester dragoons, left the city about eleven o'clock, and proceeded up the Old York road. About a mile beyond the Billet they fell in with Lacey's brigade of militia, consisting of about 500 men, and immediately attacked them: Lacey, at first, made some appearance of opposition, but, in a few seconds, was thrown into confusion, obliged to retreat with precipitation, and were pursued about 4 miles. They left between 80-100 dead on the field; and on Friday, between 50-60 prisoners, besides waggoners, with 10 of their waggons loaded with baggage, flour, salt, whiskey, &c. were brought in by the troops on their return: What number of rebels were wounded, we have not been able to learn. Besides the above waggons, 3 were burnt after taking out the horses; also all the huts and what baggage could not be brought off. The royal party did not lose a single man on this occasion, and have only 7 men wounded, and 2 horses killed.

== Aftermath ==
As a result of this engagement, the American forces lost ten wagons full of much-needed supplies, and Lacey had almost 20% of his force killed, wounded or taken prisoner. Lieutenant Nielson, the officer in charge of the pickets, was court-martialed and cashiered from the militia for disobeying orders.

Among the many killed and wounded American soldiers were: George Matthews, 5th Battalion, Cumberland County Militia, wounded; John Poorman of Allen Township, soldier of the 5th Class, Third Battalion, Cumberland County Militia, killed and buried at Crooked Billet; Robert Montgomery, soldier of the 7th Battalion Cumberland County Militia, Captain Isaac Miller's Company, wounded; Aaron Penwell, Captain Walter Denny's Company, lost his arm in battle and was taken prisoner; Aaron Penwell of West Pensboro Township, 7th Battalion Militia, lost left arm; John Taylor(senior)of Greenwood Township, then Cumberland now Perry, 8th Battalion of Militia, wounded.

On May 11, Potter returned from his leave of absence and Lacey was relieved of his command. Washington requested that Lacey remain with the militia for a short time in order to familiarize Potter with the region. By late June, the British had withdrawn from Philadelphia, and the militia's safeguarding of the region was no longer of concern to Washington.

=== Alleged atrocities ===
Almost immediately after the battle, American reports surfaced which alleged that Simcoe's troops had committed atrocities, including killing prisoners of war and setting fire to the American wounded. On May 7, Washington ordered Brigadier General William Maxwell to conduct an inquiry into these allegations so that a report could be made to General Howe. Andrew Long, a justice of the peace in Bucks County, took the depositions of Colonel Watts and four residents who witnessed the battle: Samuel Henry, William Stayner, Thomas Craven and Samuel Erwin. Watts claimed that "we found the bodies of the dead usid [sic] in a most inhuman & barbarous manner" and that "the most cruel Barbarity that had ever been exercised by any civilised Nation; nay, Savage barbarity in its utmost exertion of cruelty could but equal it."

Lacey's report to Major General John Armstrong Sr. claimed that:

Some of the unfortunate, who fell into the merciless hands of the British, were more cruelly and inhumanely butchered. Some were set on fire with buckwheat straw, and others had their clothes burned on their backs. Some of the surviving sufferers say they saw the enemy set fire to wounded while yet alive, who struggled to put it out but were too weak and expired under the torture. I saw those lying in the buckwheat straw—they made a most melancholy appearance. Others I saw, who, after being wounded with a ball, had received near a dozen wounds with cutlasses and bayonets. I can find as many witnesses to the proof of the cruelties as there were people on the spot, and that was no small number who came as spectators.

== Order of battle ==
=== British and loyalist forces ===
- Queen's Rangers
- 120 dragoons from the 17th Light Dragoons (under Major Crewe)
- 1st and 2nd Light Infantry Battalions (see account by Sgt. Thomas Sullivan, 2nd Lt. Inf. Bn. in From Redcoat to Rebel: p. 215)
- Philadelphia Light Dragoons, also referred to as Hovenden's Royal Militia (under Captain Kerr)
- James' Troop of Provincial Dragoons (under Captain Jacob James)

=== American forces ===
- Pennsylvania Militia, Bucks County Regiment (under Captain William Pugh)
- Pennsylvania Militia, Cumberland County Regiments (under Colonels Frederick Watts and Abraham Smith)
