= New Jersey's 4th congressional district =

U.S. House district for New Jersey

Coordinates: 40.1600°N 74.4242°W

- Interactive map of district boundaries since January 3, 2023
- Representative: Chris Smith; R–Manchester Township
- Distribution: 95.08% urban; 4.92% rural
- Population (2025): 805,512
- Median household income: $101,997
- Ethnicity: 80.5% White; 10.3% Hispanic; 3.3% Black; 2.7% Two or more races; 2.5% Asian; 0.7% other
- Cook PVI: R+14

New Jersey's 4th congressional district is a congressional district in New Jersey. It encompasses parts of Monmouth and Ocean County along the Jersey Shore.

The district has been represented by Republican Chris Smith since 1981, the second-longest currently serving representative and the longest serving member of Congress from New Jersey in history.

== History ==
Although the 4th district was based in Mercer County for decades, the county's Hamilton Township and Robbinsville Township were removed from the district during the redistricting process following the 2020 census. The district is now limited to Monmouth County and Ocean County.

With a Cook Partisan Voting Index rating of R+14, it is the most Republican district in New Jersey, and the only one to not elect a Democrat in 2018 and 2026.

== Counties and municipalities in the district ==
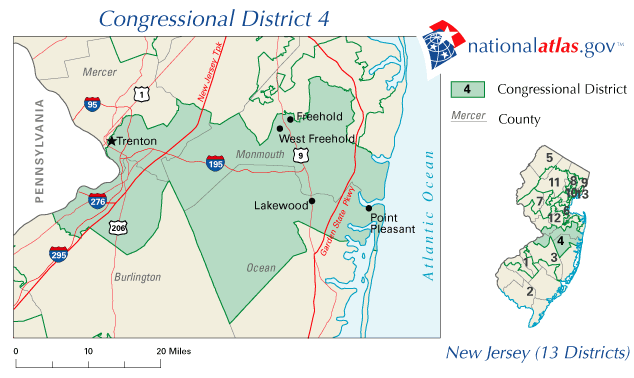
The district from 2003 to 2013

For the 118th and successive Congresses (based on redistricting following the 2020 Census), the district contains all or portions of two counties and 40 municipalities.

Municipalities in the district are:

Monmouth County (19)

Avon-By-The-Sea, Belmar, Brielle, Colts Neck Township, Eatontown, Farmingdale, Freehold Township (part; also 3rd), Howell Township, Lake Como, Manasquan, Middletown Township (part; also 6th; includes Lincroft, Navesink, and part of Belford, Fairview, North Middletown, and Port Monmouth), Ocean Township, Sea Girt, Shrewsbury, Shrewsbury Township, Spring Lake, Spring Lake Heights, Tinton Falls, Wall Township

Ocean County (21)

Bay Head, Beachwood, Berkeley Township (part; also 2nd; includes Holiday City-Berkeley, Holiday City South, Holiday Heights, and Silver Ridge), Brick Township, Island Heights, Jackson Township, Lacey Township (part; also 2nd; includes Forked River), Lakehurst, Lakewood Township, Lavallette, Manchester Township, Mantoloking, Ocean Gate, Pine Beach, Point Pleasant Beach, Point Pleasant, Plumsted Township, Seaside Heights, Seaside Park, South Toms River, Toms River

== Recent election results from statewide races ==
Year	Office	Results
2008	President	McCain 58% - 41%
2012	President	Romney 59% - 41%
2016	President	Trump 62% - 34%
2017	Governor	Guadagno 61% - 37%
2018	Senate	Hugin 61% - 36%
2020	President	Trump 61% - 38%
2020	Senate	Mehta 60% - 38%
2021	Governor	Ciattarelli 65% - 34%
2024	President	Trump 64% - 34%
2024	Senate	Bashaw 62% - 37%
2025	Governor	Ciattarelli 64% - 35%

== List of members representing the district ==
Member District home	Party	Years	Cong ress	Electoral history	Counties/Towns
District established March 4, 1799
James H. Imlay (Allentown)	Federalist	March 4, 1799 – March 3, 1801	6th	Redistricted from the at-large district and re-elected in 1798. Retired.	1799–1801; Burlington and Monmouth
District dissolved March 3, 1801
District re-established March 4, 1843
Littleton Kirkpatrick (New Brunswick)	Democratic	March 4, 1843 – March 3, 1845	28th	Elected in 1842. Retired.	1843–1845; Middlesex, Morris, and Somerset
Joseph E. Edsall (Hamburg)	Democratic	March 4, 1845 – March 3, 1847	29th	Elected in 1844. Redistricted to the 3rd district.	1845–1847; Morris, Sussex, and Warren
John Van Dyke (New Brunswick)	Whig	March 4, 1847 – March 3, 1851	30th 31st	Elected in 1846. Re-elected in 1848. Retired.	1847–1853; Middlesex, Morris, and Somerset
George H. Brown (Somerville)	Whig	March 4, 1851 – March 3, 1853	32nd	Elected in 1850. Retired.	1847–1853; Middlesex, Morris, and Somerset
George Vail (Morristown)	Democratic	March 4, 1853 – March 3, 1857	33rd 34th	Elected in 1852. Re-elected in 1854. Retired.	1853–1863; Bergen, Morris, Passaic, and Sussex
John Huyler (Hackensack)	Democratic	March 4, 1857 – March 3, 1859	35th	Elected in 1856. Lost re-election as a Lecompton Democrat.	1853–1863; Bergen, Morris, Passaic, and Sussex
Jetur R. Riggs (Paterson)	Anti-Lecompton Democratic	March 4, 1859 – March 3, 1861	36th	Elected in 1858. Retired.	1853–1863; Bergen, Morris, Passaic, and Sussex
George T. Cobb (Morristown)	Democratic	March 4, 1861 – March 3, 1863	37th	Elected in 1860. Retired.	1853–1863; Bergen, Morris, Passaic, and Sussex
Andrew J. Rogers (Newton)	Democratic	March 4, 1863 – March 3, 1867	38th 39th	Elected in 1862. Re-elected in 1864. Lost re-election.	1863–1873; Bergen, Essex (except Newark), Morris, Passaic, and Sussex
John Hill (Boonton)	Republican	March 4, 1867 – March 3, 1873	40th 41st 42nd	Elected in 1866. Re-elected in 1868. Re-elected in 1870. Retired.	1863–1873; Bergen, Essex (except Newark), Morris, Passaic, and Sussex
Robert Hamilton (Newton)	Democratic	March 4, 1873 – March 3, 1877	43rd 44th	Elected in 1872. Re-elected in 1874. Retired.	1873–1893; Hunterdon, Somerset, Sussex, and Warren
Alvah A. Clark (Somerville)	Democratic	March 4, 1877 – March 3, 1881	45th 46th	Elected in 1876. Re-elected in 1878. Retired.	1873–1893; Hunterdon, Somerset, Sussex, and Warren
Henry S. Harris (Belvidere)	Democratic	March 4, 1881 – March 3, 1883	47th	Elected in 1880. Lost re-election.	1873–1893; Hunterdon, Somerset, Sussex, and Warren
Benjamin F. Howey (Columbia)	Republican	March 4, 1883 – March 3, 1885	48th	Elected in 1882. Retired.	1873–1893; Hunterdon, Somerset, Sussex, and Warren
James N. Pidcock (Whitehouse Station)	Democratic	March 4, 1885 – March 3, 1889	49th 50th	Elected in 1884. Re-elected in 1886. Retired.	1873–1893; Hunterdon, Somerset, Sussex, and Warren
Samuel Fowler (Newton)	Democratic	March 4, 1889 – March 3, 1893	51st 52nd	Elected in 1888. Re-elected in 1890. Retired.	1873–1893; Hunterdon, Somerset, Sussex, and Warren
Johnston Cornish (Washington)	Democratic	March 4, 1893 – March 3, 1895	53rd	Elected in 1892. Lost re-election.	1893–1903; Hunterdon, Morris, Sussex, and Warren
Mahlon Pitney (Morristown)	Republican	March 4, 1895 – January 10, 1899	54th 55th	Elected in 1894. Re-elected in 1896. Re-elected in 1898 but resigned on election to New Jersey State Senate.	1893–1903; Hunterdon, Morris, Sussex, and Warren
Vacant		January 10, 1899 – March 3, 1899	55th		1893–1903; Hunterdon, Morris, Sussex, and Warren
Joshua S. Salmon (Boonton)	Democratic	March 4, 1899 – May 6, 1902	56th 57th	Elected to finish Pitney's term. Re-elected in 1900. Died.	1893–1903; Hunterdon, Morris, Sussex, and Warren
Vacant		May 6, 1902 – June 18, 1902	57th		1893–1903; Hunterdon, Morris, Sussex, and Warren
De Witt C. Flanagan (Morristown)	Democratic	June 18, 1902 – March 3, 1903	57th	Elected to finish Salmon's term. Retired.	1893–1903; Hunterdon, Morris, Sussex, and Warren
William M. Lanning (Trenton)	Republican	March 4, 1903 – June 6, 1904	58th	Elected in 1902. Resigned on appointment as district judge of 3rd circuit.	1903–1933; Hunterdon, Mercer, and Somerset
Vacant		June 6, 1904 – November 8, 1904	58th		1903–1933; Hunterdon, Mercer, and Somerset
Ira W. Wood (Trenton)	Republican	November 8, 1904 – March 3, 1913	58th 59th 60th 61st 62nd	Elected to finish Lanning's term. Also elected to the next full term. Re-elected in 1906. Re-elected in 1908. Re-elected in 1910. Retired.	1903–1933; Hunterdon, Mercer, and Somerset
Allan B. Walsh (Trenton)	Democratic	March 4, 1913 – March 3, 1915	63rd	Elected in 1912. Lost re-election.	1903–1933; Hunterdon, Mercer, and Somerset
Elijah C. Hutchinson (Trenton)	Republican	March 4, 1915 – March 3, 1923	64th 65th 66th 67th	Elected in 1914. Re-elected in 1916. Re-elected in 1918. Re-elected in 1920. Lost re-election.	1903–1933; Hunterdon, Mercer, and Somerset
Charles Browne (Princeton)	Democratic	March 4, 1923 – March 3, 1925	68th	Elected in 1922. Lost re-election.	1903–1933; Hunterdon, Mercer, and Somerset
Charles A. Eaton (North Plainfield)	Republican	March 4, 1925 – March 3, 1933	69th 70th 71st 72nd	Elected in 1924. Re-elected in 1926. Re-elected in 1928. Re-elected in 1930. Redistricted to the 5th district.	1903–1933; Hunterdon, Mercer, and Somerset
D. Lane Powers (Trenton)	Republican	March 4, 1933 – August 30, 1945	73rd 74th 75th 76th 77th 78th 79th	Elected in 1932. Re-elected in 1934. Re-elected in 1936. Re-elected in 1938. Re-elected in 1940. Re-elected in 1942. Re-elected in 1944. Resigned to become member of New Jersey Public Utilities Commission.	1933–1967; Burlington and Mercer
Vacant		August 30, 1945 – November 6, 1945	79th		1933–1967; Burlington and Mercer
Frank A. Mathews Jr. (Riverton)	Republican	November 6, 1945 – January 3, 1949	79th 80th	Elected to finish Powers's term. Re-elected in 1946. Retired.	1933–1967; Burlington and Mercer
Charles R. Howell (Pennington)	Democratic	January 3, 1949 – January 3, 1955	81st 82nd 83rd	Elected in 1948. Re-elected in 1950. Re-elected in 1952. Retired to run for U.S. senator.	1933–1967; Burlington and Mercer
Frank Thompson Jr. (Trenton)	Democratic	January 3, 1955 – December 29, 1980	84th 85th 86th 87th 88th 89th 90th 91st 92nd 93rd 94th 95th 96th	Elected in 1954. Re-elected in 1956. Re-elected in 1958. Re-elected in 1960. Re-elected in 1962. Re-elected in 1964. Re-elected in 1968. Re-elected in 1970. Re-elected in 1972. Re-elected in 1974. Re-elected in 1976. Re-elected in 1978. Lost re-election and resigned early.	1933–1967; Burlington and Mercer
Frank Thompson Jr. (Trenton)	Democratic	January 3, 1955 – December 29, 1980	84th 85th 86th 87th 88th 89th 90th 91st 92nd 93rd 94th 95th 96th	Elected in 1954. Re-elected in 1956. Re-elected in 1958. Re-elected in 1960. Re-elected in 1962. Re-elected in 1964. Re-elected in 1968. Re-elected in 1970. Re-elected in 1972. Re-elected in 1974. Re-elected in 1976. Re-elected in 1978. Lost re-election and resigned early.	1967–1971: Hunterdon, Mercer, Sussex, and Warren
Frank Thompson Jr. (Trenton)	Democratic	January 3, 1955 – December 29, 1980	84th 85th 86th 87th 88th 89th 90th 91st 92nd 93rd 94th 95th 96th	Elected in 1954. Re-elected in 1956. Re-elected in 1958. Re-elected in 1960. Re-elected in 1962. Re-elected in 1964. Re-elected in 1968. Re-elected in 1970. Re-elected in 1972. Re-elected in 1974. Re-elected in 1976. Re-elected in 1978. Lost re-election and resigned early.	1971–1973: [data missing]
Frank Thompson Jr. (Trenton)	Democratic	January 3, 1955 – December 29, 1980	84th 85th 86th 87th 88th 89th 90th 91st 92nd 93rd 94th 95th 96th	Elected in 1954. Re-elected in 1956. Re-elected in 1958. Re-elected in 1960. Re-elected in 1962. Re-elected in 1964. Re-elected in 1968. Re-elected in 1970. Re-elected in 1972. Re-elected in 1974. Re-elected in 1976. Re-elected in 1978. Lost re-election and resigned early.	1973–1983: Parts of Burlington, Mercer, Middlesex, and Ocean
Vacant		December 29, 1980 – January 3, 1981	96th		1973–1983: Parts of Burlington, Mercer, Middlesex, and Ocean
Chris Smith (Manchester Township)	Republican	January 3, 1981 – present	97th 98th 99th 100th 101st 102nd 103rd 104th 105th 106th 107th 108th 109th 110th 111th 112th 113th 114th 115th 116th 117th 118th 119th	Elected in 1980. Re-elected in 1982. Re-elected in 1984. Re-elected in 1986. Re-elected in 1988. Re-elected in 1990. Re-elected in 1992. Re-elected in 1994. Re-elected in 1996. Re-elected in 1998. Re-elected in 2000. Re-elected in 2002. Re-elected in 2004. Re-elected in 2006. Re-elected in 2008. Re-elected in 2010. Re-elected in 2012. Re-elected in 2014. Re-elected in 2016. Re-elected in 2018. Re-elected in 2020. Re-elected in 2022. Re-elected in 2024. Re-elected in 2026.	1973–1983: Parts of Burlington, Mercer, Middlesex, and Ocean
Chris Smith (Manchester Township)	Republican	January 3, 1981 – present	97th 98th 99th 100th 101st 102nd 103rd 104th 105th 106th 107th 108th 109th 110th 111th 112th 113th 114th 115th 116th 117th 118th 119th	Elected in 1980. Re-elected in 1982. Re-elected in 1984. Re-elected in 1986. Re-elected in 1988. Re-elected in 1990. Re-elected in 1992. Re-elected in 1994. Re-elected in 1996. Re-elected in 1998. Re-elected in 2000. Re-elected in 2002. Re-elected in 2004. Re-elected in 2006. Re-elected in 2008. Re-elected in 2010. Re-elected in 2012. Re-elected in 2014. Re-elected in 2016. Re-elected in 2018. Re-elected in 2020. Re-elected in 2022. Re-elected in 2024. Re-elected in 2026.	1983–1985: Parts of Burlington, Mercer, Middlesex, and Monmouth
Chris Smith (Manchester Township)	Republican	January 3, 1981 – present	97th 98th 99th 100th 101st 102nd 103rd 104th 105th 106th 107th 108th 109th 110th 111th 112th 113th 114th 115th 116th 117th 118th 119th	Elected in 1980. Re-elected in 1982. Re-elected in 1984. Re-elected in 1986. Re-elected in 1988. Re-elected in 1990. Re-elected in 1992. Re-elected in 1994. Re-elected in 1996. Re-elected in 1998. Re-elected in 2000. Re-elected in 2002. Re-elected in 2004. Re-elected in 2006. Re-elected in 2008. Re-elected in 2010. Re-elected in 2012. Re-elected in 2014. Re-elected in 2016. Re-elected in 2018. Re-elected in 2020. Re-elected in 2022. Re-elected in 2024. Re-elected in 2026.	1985–1993: Parts of Burlington, Mercer, Middlesex, Monmouth, and Ocean
Chris Smith (Manchester Township)	Republican	January 3, 1981 – present	97th 98th 99th 100th 101st 102nd 103rd 104th 105th 106th 107th 108th 109th 110th 111th 112th 113th 114th 115th 116th 117th 118th 119th	Elected in 1980. Re-elected in 1982. Re-elected in 1984. Re-elected in 1986. Re-elected in 1988. Re-elected in 1990. Re-elected in 1992. Re-elected in 1994. Re-elected in 1996. Re-elected in 1998. Re-elected in 2000. Re-elected in 2002. Re-elected in 2004. Re-elected in 2006. Re-elected in 2008. Re-elected in 2010. Re-elected in 2012. Re-elected in 2014. Re-elected in 2016. Re-elected in 2018. Re-elected in 2020. Re-elected in 2022. Re-elected in 2024. Re-elected in 2026.	1993–2003: Parts of Burlington, Mercer, Monmouth, and Ocean
Chris Smith (Manchester Township)	Republican	January 3, 1981 – present	97th 98th 99th 100th 101st 102nd 103rd 104th 105th 106th 107th 108th 109th 110th 111th 112th 113th 114th 115th 116th 117th 118th 119th	Elected in 1980. Re-elected in 1982. Re-elected in 1984. Re-elected in 1986. Re-elected in 1988. Re-elected in 1990. Re-elected in 1992. Re-elected in 1994. Re-elected in 1996. Re-elected in 1998. Re-elected in 2000. Re-elected in 2002. Re-elected in 2004. Re-elected in 2006. Re-elected in 2008. Re-elected in 2010. Re-elected in 2012. Re-elected in 2014. Re-elected in 2016. Re-elected in 2018. Re-elected in 2020. Re-elected in 2022. Re-elected in 2024. Re-elected in 2026.	2003–2013: Parts of Burlington, Mercer, Monmouth, and Ocean
Chris Smith (Manchester Township)	Republican	January 3, 1981 – present	97th 98th 99th 100th 101st 102nd 103rd 104th 105th 106th 107th 108th 109th 110th 111th 112th 113th 114th 115th 116th 117th 118th 119th	Elected in 1980. Re-elected in 1982. Re-elected in 1984. Re-elected in 1986. Re-elected in 1988. Re-elected in 1990. Re-elected in 1992. Re-elected in 1994. Re-elected in 1996. Re-elected in 1998. Re-elected in 2000. Re-elected in 2002. Re-elected in 2004. Re-elected in 2006. Re-elected in 2008. Re-elected in 2010. Re-elected in 2012. Re-elected in 2014. Re-elected in 2016. Re-elected in 2018. Re-elected in 2020. Re-elected in 2022. Re-elected in 2024. Re-elected in 2026.	2013–2023: Parts of Mercer, Monmouth, and Ocean
Chris Smith (Manchester Township)	Republican	January 3, 1981 – present	97th 98th 99th 100th 101st 102nd 103rd 104th 105th 106th 107th 108th 109th 110th 111th 112th 113th 114th 115th 116th 117th 118th 119th	Elected in 1980. Re-elected in 1982. Re-elected in 1984. Re-elected in 1986. Re-elected in 1988. Re-elected in 1990. Re-elected in 1992. Re-elected in 1994. Re-elected in 1996. Re-elected in 1998. Re-elected in 2000. Re-elected in 2002. Re-elected in 2004. Re-elected in 2006. Re-elected in 2008. Re-elected in 2010. Re-elected in 2012. Re-elected in 2014. Re-elected in 2016. Re-elected in 2018. Re-elected in 2020. Re-elected in 2022. Re-elected in 2024. Re-elected in 2026.	2023–present: Parts of Monmouth and Ocean

== Recent election results ==
=== 2012 ===
New Jersey's 4th congressional district, 2012
Party	Candidate	Votes	%
Republican	Chris Smith (incumbent)	195,146	63.7
Democratic	Brian Froelich	107,992	35.3
Independent	Leonard Marshall	3,111	1.0
Total votes		306,247	100.0
Republican hold			

=== 2014 ===
New Jersey's 4th congressional district, 2014
Party	Candidate	Votes	%
Republican	Chris Smith (incumbent)	118,826	68.0
Democratic	Ruben M. Scolavino	54,415	31.1
Independent	Scott Neuman	1,608	0.9
Total votes		174,849	100.0
Republican hold			

=== 2016 ===
New Jersey's 4th congressional district, 2016
Party	Candidate	Votes	%
Republican	Chris Smith (incumbent)	211,992	63.7
Democratic	Lorna Phillipson	111,532	33.5
Independent	Hank Schroeder	5,840	1.8
Libertarian	Jeremy Marcus	3,320	1.0
Total votes		332,684	100.0
Republican hold			

=== 2018 ===
New Jersey's 4th congressional district, 2018
Party	Candidate	Votes	%
Republican	Chris Smith (incumbent)	163,065	55.4
Democratic	Joshua Welle	126,766	43.1
Libertarian	Michael Rufo	1,387	0.5
Independent	Ed Stackhouse	1,064	0.4
Independent	Brian Reynolds	851	0.3
Independent	Felicia Stoler	844	0.3
Independent	Allen Yusufov	371	0.1
Total votes		294,348	100.0
Republican hold			

=== 2020 ===
New Jersey's 4th congressional district, 2020
Party	Candidate	Votes	%
Republican	Chris Smith (incumbent)	254,103	59.9
Democratic	Stephanie Schmid	162,420	38.3
Independent	Hank Schroeder	3,195	0.7
Libertarian	Michael Rufo	2,583	0.6
Independent	Andrew Pachuta	2,067	0.5
Total votes		424,368	100.0
Republican hold			

=== 2022 ===
New Jersey's 4th congressional district, 2022
Party	Candidate	Votes	%
Republican	Chris Smith (incumbent)	173,288	66.9
Democratic	Matthew Jenkins	81,233	31.4
Libertarian	Jason Cullen	1,902	0.7
Independent	David Schmidt	1,197	0.5
Independent	Hank Schroeder	905	0.3
Independent	Pam Daniels	437	0.2
Total votes		258,962	100.0
Republican hold			

=== 2024 ===
2024 New Jersey's 4th congressional district election
Party	Candidate	Votes	%
Republican	Chris Smith (incumbent)	265,652	67.4
Democratic	Matthew Jenkins	124,803	31.6
Libertarian	John Morrison	1,950	0.5
Green	Barry Bendar	1,823	0.5
Total votes		394,228	100.0
Republican hold			
