= Holiday City – Silver Ridge Park =

Populated place in Ocean County, New Jersey, US

Coordinates: 39.977646°N 74.270325°W

Holiday City – Silver Ridge is an unincorporated master-planned community located within Berkeley Township in Ocean County, in the U.S. state of New Jersey, near Toms River. The entire community has a total population of 21,631 in five separate census-designated places according to the 2000 United States census. The subdivision is divided into four sections: Holiday City-Berkeley (2000 population of 13,884), Holiday City South (4,047), Holiday Heights (2,389) and Silver Ridge Park (1,211). The community consists of many strip malls, a mini mall containing over 20 stores, doctors offices, real estate offices, banks and a hospital. The main roadways are Mule Road and Jamaica Boulevard.

The development is an age-restricted adult community and is located off of Route 37 just west of the Garden State Parkway.

== Sections and neighborhoods ==
=== Holiday City ===
In the Holiday City communities, homes are detached, ranch style built on minimum 50-by-100-foot (15 by 30 m) lots, with some lots larger to accommodate larger models.

Holiday City consists of five separate communities, each with its own homeowners association and amenities:

- Holiday City Berkeley
- Holiday City Carefree
- Holiday City West
- Holiday City South
- Holiday Heights

=== Silver Ridge ===
In the Silver Ridge Communities, homes are single-story detached on a crawl space, each with attached garage, and situated on 60-by-100-foot (18 by 30 m) lots. Floor plans vary considerably. In addition to living room, dining room, eat-in-kitchen, attached garage, one or two bedrooms and one or two bathrooms, homes may also include family rooms/dens, open or closed porches, sun rooms, patios and decks.

The adult communities of Silver Ridge Park consist of four separate areas, each with its own homeowners association and amenities. These are:

- Silver Ridge Park (East)
- Silver Ridge Park West
- Silver Ridge Park – Westerly Extension
- Silver Ridge Park North
