= Micromedia Publications =

Newspaper publisher from New Jersey

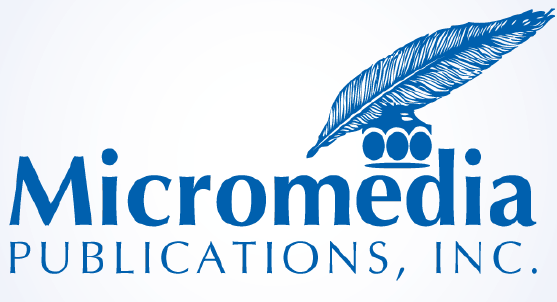
- Type: Weekly
- Format: Tabloid
- Owner(s): Stewart Swann; Jason Allentoff
- Founder(s): Stewart Swann; Robyn Friedrich
- Editor-in-chief: Jason Allentoff
- Editor: Chris Lundy
- Founded: 1995
- Language: English
- Headquarters: 683 Route 70; Lakehurst, NJ 08733
- Circulation: 60,000 (2016)
- Website: www.jerseyshoreonline.com

Micromedia Publications is the publisher of seven weekly newspapers based in Monmouth/Ocean County, New Jersey. The newspapers cover Howell, Jackson, Toms River, Manchester, Brick, Berkeley Township, Lacey Township, Barnegat, Stafford Township and Long Beach Island. The newspapers are published every Saturday and are distributed through various distribution methods. All seven newspapers are a free press.

== History ==
In 1995, Stewart Swann and Robyn Friedrich founded the company by launching The Manchester Times. The company introduced The Berkeley Times (1996), The Lakewood Times (1998) (ceased publication in 2002), The Jackson Times (2000), The Brick Times (2002), The Howell Times (2004), The Toms River Times (2005) and The Lacey Barnegat Times (2010), now The Southern Ocean Times (2013).

The news editor is Chris Lundy. The Vice President and Chief Operating Officer is Jason Allentoff, formerly of Townsquare Media.

From 1995 until September 2019, the company was based on Union Avenue in Lakehurst. In late 2019, the company moved to the Lakehurst Circle Center to more modern facilities.

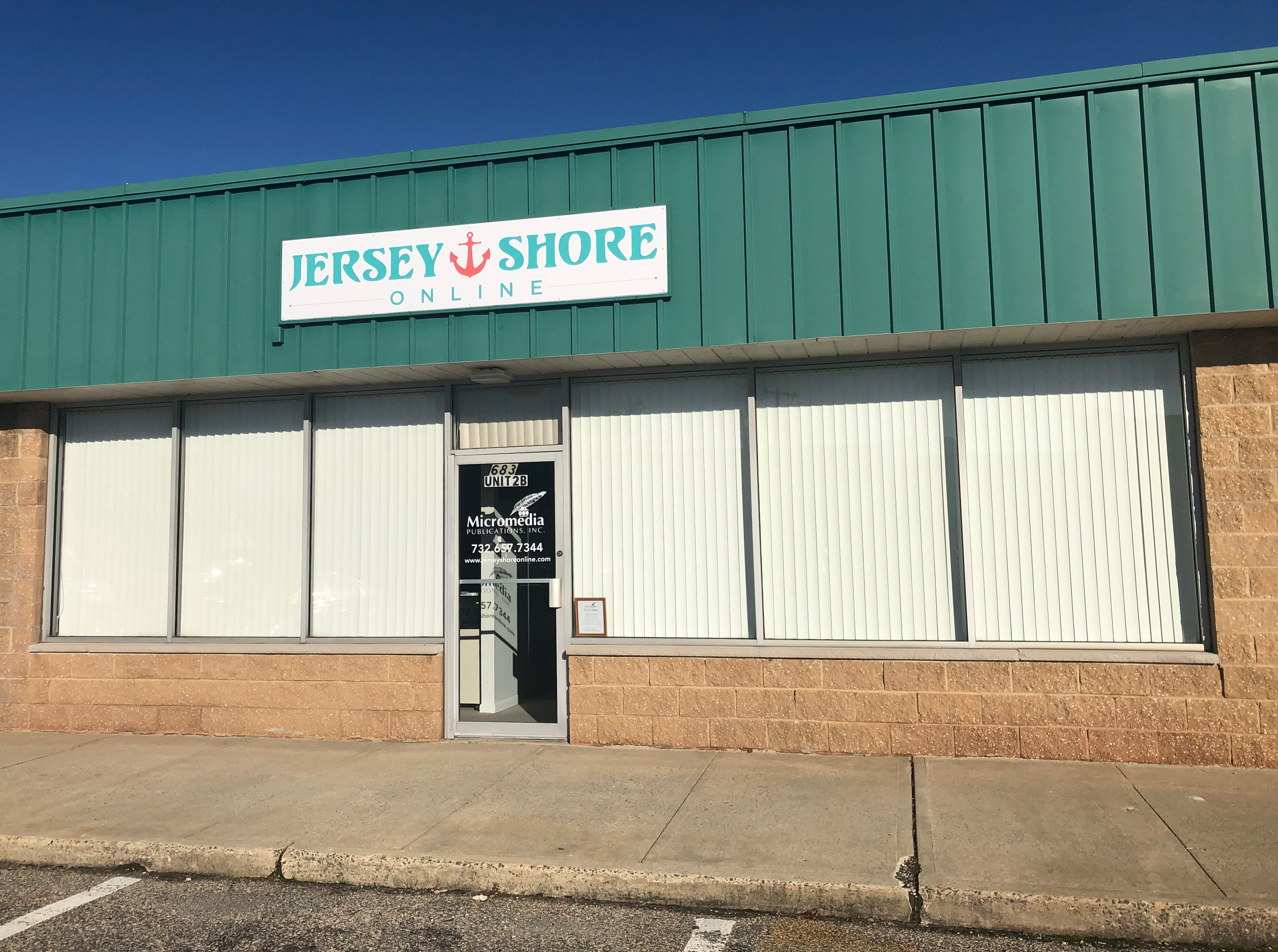

== Coverage Area ==
The newspapers cover Howell, Adelphia, Farmingdale, Ramtown, Jackson, Plumsted Township, New Egypt, Lakewood, Brick, Toms River, Island Heights, Lavallette, Manchester, Lakehurst, Whiting, Berkeley Township, Holiday City, Pine Beach, Seaside Heights, Seaside Park, Bayville, Lanoka Harbor, Lacey Township, Forked River, Waretown, Ocean Township, Barnegat, Stafford Township, Manahawkin, Ocean Acres, Beach Haven West, Eagleswood and Long Beach Island.

The newspapers include:

- The Toms River Times
- The Manchester Times
- The Berkeley Times
- The Brick Times
- The Jackson Times
- The Southern Ocean Times
- The Howell Times

The websites include:

- Jersey Shore Online
- Toms River Online
- Bricktown Online

== Distribution ==
All seven of Micromedia's newspapers are distributed free in Monmouth/Ocean County, New Jersey. In addition to the print editions, Micromedia newspapers can be found online through the issuu service.

== Radio and Digital ==
Micromedia has a special arrangement with WBNJ in Barnegat. During drivetime, the station broadcasts newscasts that contain Micromedia news content.

In 2017, Micromedia launched Jersey Shore Online, a hyperlocal breaking news website

In January 2022, Micromedia acquired a number of digital properties including Toms River Online, Bricktown Online, Bayville Online, Seaside Heights Online and Southern Ocean County Online.

== Anniversary Honors ==
On Micromedia's 20th anniversary, Ocean County Commissioners Gerry P. Little and Joseph H. Vicari presented the owners and staff with a proclamation marking the occasion. Senator Christopher J. Connors was on hand for the ceremony. Towns including Toms River and Berkeley Township also marked the event with special mentions at their respective council meetings.
