= Senator Riggs =

Senator Riggs may refer to:

- Jack Riggs (born 1954), Idaho State Senate
- Jetur R. Riggs (1809–1869), New Jersey State Senate
