= Pinewald, New Jersey =

Populated place in Ocean County, New Jersey, US

- Unincorporated community
- Pinewald's location in Ocean County (Inset: Ocean County in New Jersey)
- Coordinates: 39°53′44″N 74°10′23″W
- Country: United States
- State: New Jersey
- County: Ocean
- Township: Berkeley
- Elevation: 36 ft (11 m)
- GNIS feature ID: 879329

Pinewald is an unincorporated community located within Berkeley Township in Ocean County, in the U.S. state of New Jersey. The community is located between U.S. Route 9 and the Garden State Parkway. Pinewald was established in the 1880s and consisted of a post office, land office, two banks, a commissary and a railroad station. The railway station served Pinewald and the Bayville area, on what is now the Barnegat Branch Trail, a 15-mile (24 km) walking trail. The community was economically unsuccessful and was destroyed by 3 fires.

The Pines Hotel was located at the corner of Central Boulevard and Nixon Avenue in Pinewald. It opened in 1891 and accommodated nearly 200 guests. A fire destroyed the hotel in 1895. In 1930, another hotel opened in Pinewald called the Royal Pines Hotel. It was adjacent to Crystal Lake and accommodated 400 guests. The hotel went through many ownerships and bankruptcies, ultimately converting into a hospital and nursing home facilities, including Dennis Hospital, Pinehaven, Bayview Convalescent Center, and currently Crystal Lake Rehabilitation and Healthcare Center.

The Pinewald Golf Club Course opened in 1930 on land currently part of the Cedar Creek Golf Course.
