= George T. Cobb =

American politician (1813–1870)

George Thomas Cobb
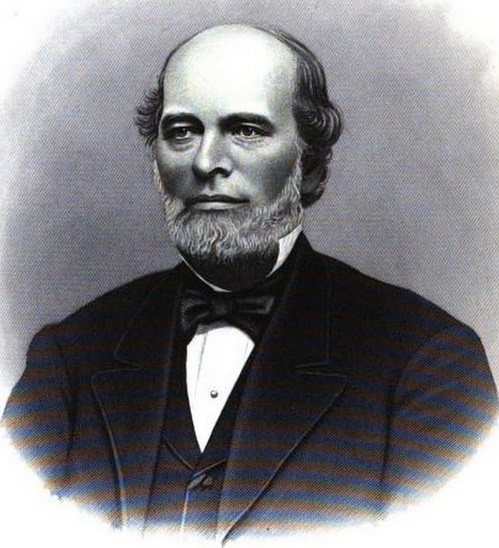

Member of the U.S. House of Representatives from New Jersey's 4th district
- In office March 4, 1861 – March 3, 1863
- Preceded by: Jetur R. Riggs
- Succeeded by: Andrew J. Rogers

Member of the New Jersey Senate from Morris County
- In office 1866–August 12, 1870
- Preceded by: Lyman A. Chandler
- Succeeded by: Columbus Beach

Personal details
- Born: October 13, 1813 Morristown, New Jersey
- Died: August 12, 1870 (aged 56) White Sulphur Springs, West Virginia
- Party: Democratic
- Profession: Politician

George Thomas Cobb (October 13, 1813 – August 12, 1870) was an American Democratic Party politician who represented New Jersey's 4th congressional district for one term from 1861 to 1863.

== Biography ==
Cobb was born in Morristown, New Jersey on October 13, 1813. He became an orphan when six years of age and received very little schooling. He was employed at an early age as a clerk in a store at Denville, New Jersey and later employed at the iron works at Powerville and Boonton, New Jersey. He transferred to a store in New York City. He engaged in foreign trade and retired from active business pursuits after having amassed a fortune. He returned to New Jersey, and was elected as a Democrat to the Thirty-seventh Congress, serving in office from March 4, 1861 – March 3, 1863, and declined to be a candidate for renomination in 1862.

After leaving Congress, he was affiliated with the Republican Party in 1863 and as such was elected a member of the New Jersey Senate in 1865 and again in 1868. He was Mayor of Morristown, New Jersey from 1865 to 1869; became a trustee of Drew Theological Seminary in 1868 and served until his death. He was an unsuccessful candidate for election to the United States Senate in 1869. He was killed in an accident on the Chesapeake and Ohio Railway at Jerrys Run, near White Sulphur Springs, West Virginia on August 12, 1870, and was interred in Evergreen Cemetery in Morristown.

U.S. House of Representatives
Preceded by Jetur R. Riggs	Member of the U.S. House of Representatives from New Jersey's 4th congressional district March 4, 1861 – March 3, 1863	Succeeded by Andrew J. Rogers
