= Crossley, New Jersey =

Populated place in Ocean County, New Jersey, US

- Unincorporated community
- Location within Ocean County; Inset: Location in the state of New Jersey Crossley, New Jersey (New Jersey) Crossley, New Jersey (the United States)
- Coordinates: 39°57′10″N 74°17′45″W
- Country: United States
- State: New Jersey
- County: Ocean
- Township: Berkeley
- Elevation: 52 ft (16 m)
- Time zone: UTC−05:00 (Eastern (EST))
  - Summer (DST): UTC−04:00 (EDT)
- GNIS feature ID: 2047035

Crossley is an unincorporated community and ghost town located within Berkeley Township in Ocean County, in the U.S. state of New Jersey. It is located along an abandoned Penn Central rail line, approximately 5 mi (8.0 km) west of Toms River CDP.

Only the ruins of Crossley remain, though the town and its surrounding area have been converted into the Crossley Preserve – a hiking and nature area.

== History ==
Crossley originated as a clay-mining town in the late 1800s, and remained active until the early 1900s. The clay was used to produce terracotta pottery, bricks, and pipes.

The land at Crossley, owned by the Crossley Clay Works, was acquired in 1914 by the George C. Crossley Company. It was sold in the 1920s to the Cypress Land Company, who later sold it to the New Jersey Natural Lands Trust.

== Crossley Preserve ==
The New Jersey Natural Land Trust established the Crossley Preserve on 251 acres (102 ha) of land at the abandoned townsite. The densely forested Pine Barrens of New Jersey surround the area. The preserve contains historic and cultural sites, and is used for environmental education, recreation, and endangered species protection.

A 1.5 mi (2.4 km) portion of the Thomas F. Hampton Memorial Trail follows an abandoned "donkey" railroad once located at Crossley. The narrow gauge railway was used to haul clay—mined from open pits—to Crossley, where it was then loaded onto rail cars of the former Pennsylvania Railroad. The mine pits have since formed into ponds. Flora and fauna along the trail include the Pine Barrens tree frog, pitch pine, scrub oak, laurels, and Atlantic white cedar. Signs have been placed along the rail trail informing visitors about fire control, endangered plants (including the state endangered Pickering's morning glory, and the federally threatened Knieskern's beaked-rush), Pine Barrens ecology, and research on endangered pine snakes and corn snakes. The signs also identify artifacts and features of the ruins of Crossley.
