= Andrew J. Rogers =

American politician (1828-1900)

Andrew Jackson Rogers
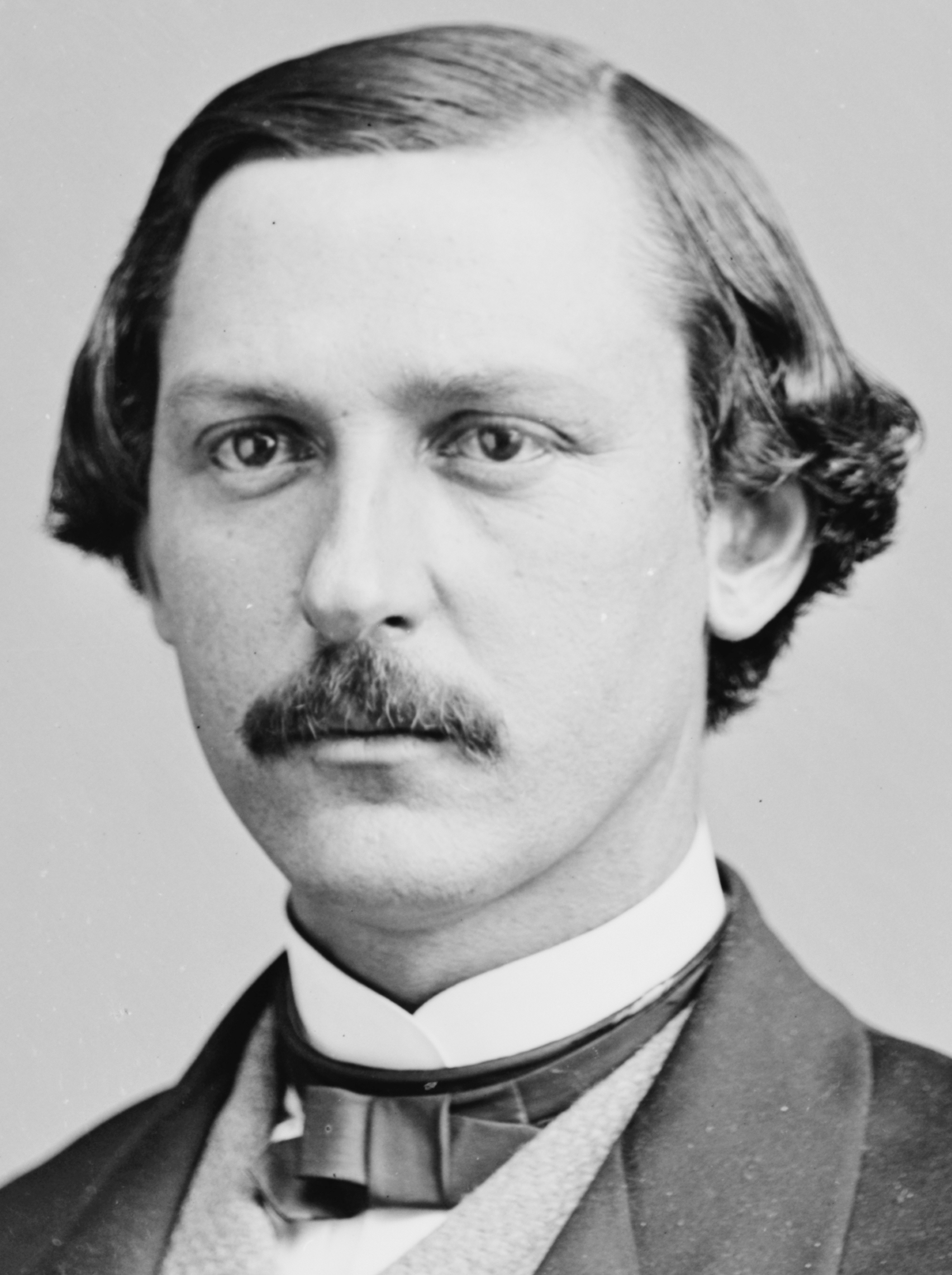

Member of the U.S. House of Representatives from New Jersey's 4th district
- In office March 4, 1863 – March 3, 1867
- Preceded by: George T. Cobb
- Succeeded by: John Hill

Personal details
- Born: July 1, 1828 Hamburg, New Jersey, USA
- Died: May 22, 1900 (aged 71) New York City, New York, USA
- Party: Democratic
- Profession: Politician, Lawyer, Teacher, Clerk, Police Commissioner

Andrew Jackson Rogers (July 1, 1828 – May 22, 1900) was an American lawyer, teacher, clerk, police commissioner, and Democratic Party politician who represented New Jersey's 4th congressional district in the United States House of Representatives for two terms from 1863 to 1867.

== Early life and career ==
Born in Hamburg, New Jersey, Rogers attended common schools as a child. He was employed as a clerk in a hotel and a country store, taught for two years, studied law, and was admitted to the bar in 1852, commencing practice in Lafayette Township, New Jersey. He moved to Newton, New Jersey, in 1857 and continued to practice law.

== Congress ==
In 1862, Rogers was elected as a Democratic Party member of the United States House of Representatives, serving in office from March 4, 1863, to March 3, 1867.

=== Lincoln assassination investigation ===
He was also part of the House Committee that looked into the assassination of President Abraham Lincoln. Only George Boutwell, the House of Representatives Committee chairman, was allowed to look into the relevant papers. Afterwards, Rogers accused him of being involved in an attempt to cover up Edwin M. Stanton's role in the assassination.

As a Congressman, Rogers served on the Joint Committee on Reconstruction, which drafted the Fourteenth Amendment to the United States Constitution.

== Later career and death ==
After being unsuccessful for reelection, Rogers moved to New York City in 1867 and became counsel for the city in important litigation. He moved to Denver, Colorado, in 1892 and served as the police commissioner of Denver. He returned to New York City in 1896 and died there on May 22, 1900. He was interred in Woodlawn Cemetery in New York City.

U.S. House of Representatives
Preceded by George T. Cobb	Member of the U.S. House of Representatives from New Jersey's 4th congressional district March 4, 1863 – March 3, 1867	Succeeded by John Hill
