= WBNJ =

Coordinates: 39.765°N 74.320°W

- Barnegat, New Jersey; United States
- Broadcast area: Monmouth–Ocean County, New Jersey
- Frequency: 91.9 MHz
- Branding: Vinyl 91.9 FM

Programming
- Format: Classic Hits

Ownership
- Owner: WWN Educational Radio Corporation

History
- First air date: May 28, 2010
- Call sign meaning: Barnegat New Jersey

Technical information
- Licensing authority: FCC
- Facility ID: 123342
- Class: A
- ERP: 4,500 watts
- HAAT: 69 meters (226 ft)

Links
- Public license information: Public file; LMS
- Webcast: Listen live
- Website: wbnj.org

WBNJ (91.9 FM, "Vinyl 91.9 FM") is an American radio station broadcasting to the Monmouth–Ocean County, New Jersey, market with 4,500 watts from a 226-foot tower located along New Jersey Route 72 in Barnegat, New Jersey. The station airs a classic hits music format.

The station's primary service area ranges from Toms River to Atlantic City along the Jersey Shore. WBNJ features top of the hour news reports from ABC News Radio and during drive times, provides local news updates from Micromedia Publications of Lakehurst, New Jersey.
