= John Huyler =

American politician

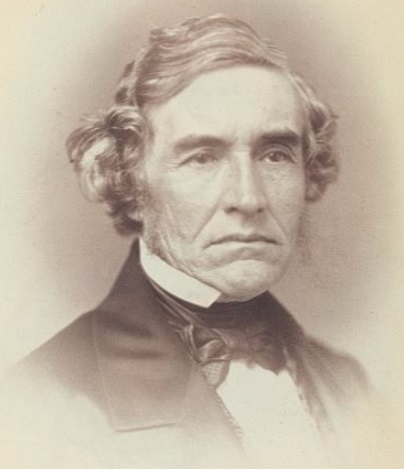
- From 1859's McClees' Gallery of Photographic Portraits of the Senators, Representatives & Delegates of the Thirty-Fifth Congress.

Member of the U.S. House of Representatives from New Jersey's 4th district
- In office March 4, 1857 – March 3, 1859
- Preceded by: George Vail
- Succeeded by: Jetur R. Riggs

Member of the New Jersey General Assembly
- In office 1850-1852

Personal details
- Born: April 9, 1808 New York City, New York, United States
- Died: January 9, 1870 (aged 61) Hackensack, United States
- Party: Democratic
- Profession: Politician

John Huyler (April 9, 1808 – January 9, 1870) was an American Democratic Party politician who represented New Jersey's 4th congressional district in the United States House of Representatives for one term from 1857 to 1859.

== Early life and career ==
Born in New York City on April 9, 1808, Huyler attended the common schools at Tenafly, New Jersey. He apprenticed as a mason and later engaged in contracting and building in New York City until 1846.

He moved to New Jersey and engaged in agricultural pursuits at Pollifly, Lodi Township. He settled in the village of Hackensack, about 1855, and engaged in the mercantile and lumber business. He served as president of the Bergen County Board of Chosen Freeholders. He served as member of the New Jersey General Assembly from 1850 to 1852, and served as its speaker in 1852. He served as judge of the Court of Errors and Appeals 1853-1857.

== Congress ==
In 1856 Judge Huyler was elected as a Democrat to the Thirty-fifth Congress in a district which comprises Bergen, Morris, Passaic and Sussex Counties; serving in office from March 4, 1857 to March 3, 1859. He was an unsuccessful candidate as a Lecompton Democrat for reelection in 1858 to the Thirty-sixth Congress. After leaving Congress, he resumed the lumber business.

== Death ==
On December 21, 1869, Huyler met a man named Benjamin Ackerman, a drunkard but a man stayed sober for a year. Huyler said to Ackerman's wife that if Ackerman were to stay sober, Huyler would not prosecute Ackerman. Things escalated as by that time it was clear he was intoxicated. Huyler attacked Ackerman with his cane and Ackerman fought back making Huyler fall on the ground. Ackerman attempted to kick him but a passerby stopped him. The police arrived bringing Huyler to his house. Huyler died in his house 5 days later.

U.S. House of Representatives
Preceded by George Vail	Member of the U.S. House of Representatives from New Jersey's 4th congressional district March 4, 1857—March 3, 1859	Succeeded by Jetur R. Riggs
