= South Toms River, New Jersey =

Borough in Ocean County, New Jersey, US

- Borough
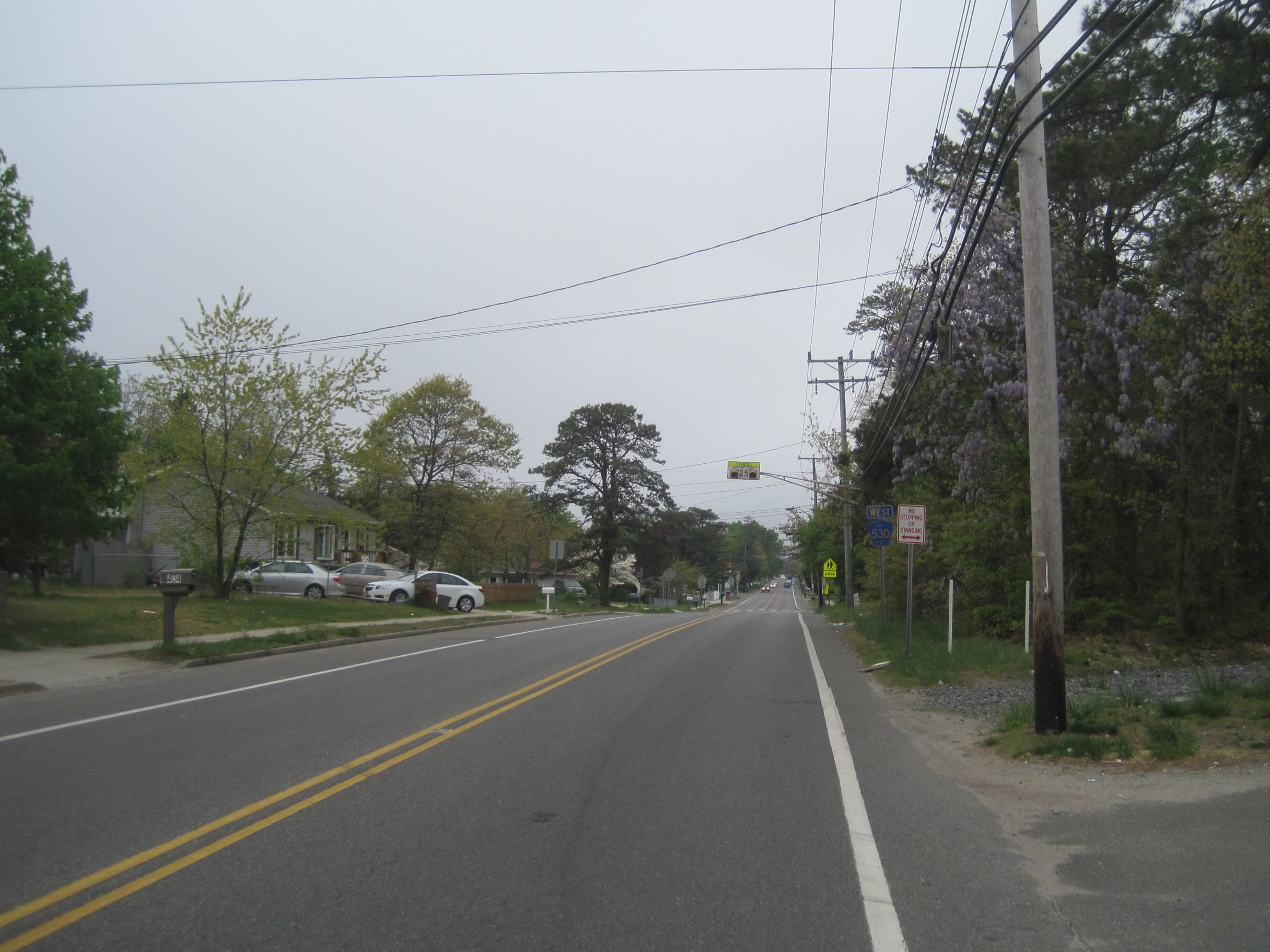
- South Toms River as seen from Dover Road (CR 530)

- Seal
- Motto: "The Little Town With a Big Heart"
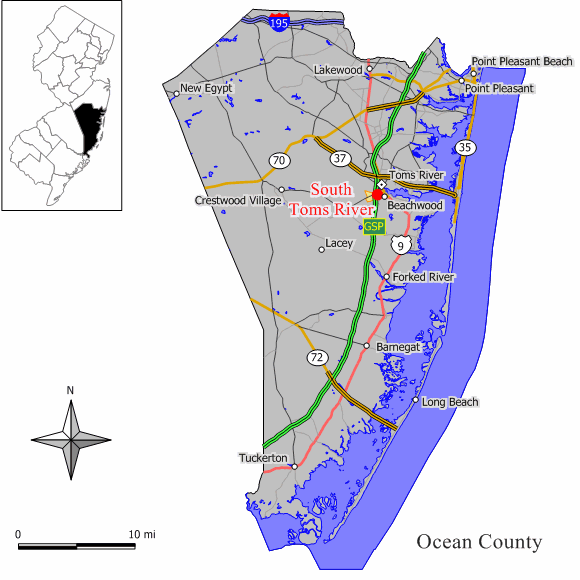
- Map of South Toms River in Ocean County. Inset: Location of Ocean County highlighted in the State of New Jersey.

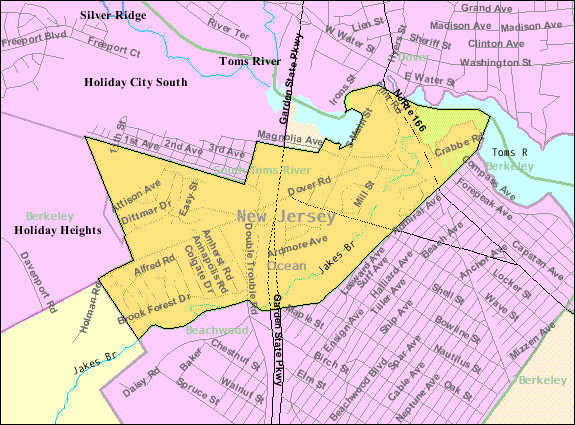
- Census Bureau map of South Toms River, New Jersey

- Location in Ocean County Location in New Jersey Location in the United States
- Coordinates: 39.939132°N 74.207024°W
- Country: United States
- state: New Jersey
- County: Ocean
- Incorporated: May 3, 1927

Government
  - Type: Borough
  - Body: Borough Council
  - Mayor: Oscar Cradle (R, term ends December 31, 2026)
  - Municipal clerk: Jamie Jubert

Area
  - Total: 1.21 sq mi (3.13 km^{2})
  - Land: 1.16 sq mi (3.00 km^{2})
  - Water: 0.050 sq mi (0.13 km^{2}) 4.21%
  - Rank: 485th of 565 in state 21st of 33 in county
- Elevation: 52 ft (16 m)

Population (2020)
  - Total: 3,643
  - Estimate (2023): 3,736
  - Rank: 424th of 565 in state 16th of 33 in county
  - Density: 3,147.3/sq mi (1,215.2/km^{2})
  - Rank: 211th of 565 in state 8th of 33 in county
- Time zone: UTC−05:00 (Eastern (EST))
  - Summer (DST): UTC−04:00 (Eastern (EDT))
- ZIP Code: 08757 – Toms River
- Area code: 732
- FIPS code: 3402969510
- GNIS feature ID: 0885404
- Website: www.southtomsriver.org

South Toms River is a borough in Ocean County, in the U.S. state of New Jersey. As of the 2020 United States census, the borough's population was 3,643, a decrease of 41 (−1.1%) from the 2010 census count of 3,684, which in turn reflected an increase of 50 (+1.4%) from the 3,634 counted in the 2000 census.

South Toms River was incorporated as a borough by an act of the New Jersey Legislature on March 28, 1927, from portions of Berkeley Township, based on the results of a referendum held on May 3, 1927. The borough was named for the Toms River and the neighboring community of Toms River, which were named for Capt. William Tom.

== Geography ==
According to the United States Census Bureau, the borough had a total area of 1.21 square miles (3.13 km^{2}), including 1.16 square miles (3.00 km^{2}) of land and 0.05 square miles (0.13 km^{2}) of water (4.21%).

The borough borders the Ocean County municipalities of Beachwood, Berkeley Township and Toms River.

South Toms River sits on the south side of the Toms River, across from Toms River Township. The borough is one of 11 municipalities in Ocean County that are part of the Toms River watershed.

== Demographics ==
Historical population
Census	Pop.	Note	%±
1930	405		—
1940	445		9.9%
1950	492		10.6%
1960	1,603		225.8%
1970	3,981		148.3%
1980	3,954		−0.7%
1990	3,869		−2.1%
2000	3,634		−6.1%
2010	3,684		1.4%
2020	3,643		−1.1%
2023 (est.)	3,736	▲	2.6%
Population sources: 1930–2000 1930; 1940–2000 2000; 2010 2020

=== 2020 census ===
As of the 2020 census, South Toms River had a population of 3,643. The median age was 33.3 years. 27.2% of residents were under the age of 18 and 10.4% of residents were 65 years of age or older. For every 100 females there were 93.9 males, and for every 100 females age 18 and over there were 90.2 males age 18 and over.

100.0% of residents lived in urban areas, while 0.0% lived in rural areas.

There were 1,081 households in South Toms River, of which 45.5% had children under the age of 18 living in them. Of all households, 49.1% were married-couple households, 14.4% were households with a male householder and no spouse or partner present, and 28.6% were households with a female householder and no spouse or partner present. About 12.8% of all households were made up of individuals and 5.4% had someone living alone who was 65 years of age or older.

There were 1,141 housing units, of which 5.3% were vacant. The homeowner vacancy rate was 1.5% and the rental vacancy rate was 6.9%.

Racial composition as of the 2020 census
Race	Number	Percent
White	1,987	54.5%
Black or African American	598	16.4%
American Indian and Alaska Native	42	1.2%
Asian	75	2.1%
Native Hawaiian and Other Pacific Islander	0	0.0%
Some other race	496	13.6%
Two or more races	445	12.2%
Hispanic or Latino (of any race)	1,040	28.5%

=== 2010 census ===
The 2010 United States census counted 3,684 people, 1,098 households, and 907 families in the borough. The population density was 3,146.7 inhabitants per square mile (1,214.9/km^{2}). There were 1,160 housing units at an average density of 990.8 per square mile (382.6/km^{2}). The racial makeup was 67.59% (2,490) White, 19.33% (712) Black or African American, 0.57% (21) Native American, 0.62% (23) Asian, 0.00% (0) Pacific Islander, 7.14% (263) from other races, and 4.75% (175) from two or more races. Hispanic or Latino of any race were 19.49% (718) of the population.

Of the 1,098 households, 36.7% had children under the age of 18; 52.3% were married couples living together; 21.9% had a female householder with no husband present and 17.4% were non-families. Of all households, 12.8% were made up of individuals and 5.6% had someone living alone who was 65 years of age or older. The average household size was 3.36 and the average family size was 3.61.

28.1% of the population were under the age of 18, 10.6% from 18 to 24, 26.7% from 25 to 44, 25.8% from 45 to 64, and 8.8% who were 65 years of age or older. The median age was 34.0 years. For every 100 females, the population had 95.0 males. For every 100 females ages 18 and older there were 90.8 males.

The Census Bureau's 2006–2010 American Community Survey showed that (in 2010 inflation-adjusted dollars) median household income was $60,408 (with a margin of error of +/− $6,382) and the median family income was $62,750 (+/− $8,524). Males had a median income of $46,370 (+/− $4,313) versus $36,133 (+/− $2,994) for females. The per capita income for the borough was $19,177 (+/− $2,685). About 17.2% of families and 22.4% of the population were below the poverty line, including 33.6% of those under age 18 and 11.5% of those age 65 or over.

=== 2000 census ===
As of the 2000 United States census there were 3,634 people, 1,073 households, and 902 families residing in the borough. The population density was 3,131.9 inhabitants per square mile (1,209.2/km^{2}). There were 1,123 housing units at an average density of 967.8 per square mile (373.7/km^{2}). The racial makeup of the borough was 72.56% White, 21.16% African American, 0.14% Native American, 0.69% Asian, 2.50% from other races, and 2.94% from two or more races. Hispanic or Latino of any race were 9.27% of the population.

There were 1,073 households, out of which 43.1% had children under the age of 18 living with them, 55.2% were married couples living together, 22.7% had a female householder with no husband present, and 15.9% were non-families. 12.5% of all households were made up of individuals, and 5.4% had someone living alone who was 65 years of age or older. The average household size was 3.39 and the average family size was 3.63.

In the borough the population was spread out, with 32.1% under the age of 18, 9.3% from 18 to 24, 29.2% from 25 to 44, 20.4% from 45 to 64, and 9.0% who were 65 years of age or older. The median age was 32 years. For every 100 females, there were 93.1 males. For every 100 females age 18 and over, there were 88.5 males.

The median income for a household in the borough was $43,468, and the median income for a family was $45,375. Males had a median income of $31,859 versus $24,837 for females. The per capita income for the borough was $16,292. About 11.2% of families and 12.6% of the population were below the poverty line, including 18.4% of those under age 18 and 18.3% of those age 65 or over.

== Government ==
=== Local government ===
South Toms River is governed under the borough form of New Jersey municipal government, which is used in 218 municipalities (of the 564) statewide, making it the most common form of government in New Jersey. The governing body is comprised of the mayor and the borough council, with all positions elected at-large on a partisan basis as part of the November general election. The mayor is elected directly by the voters to a four-year term of office. The borough council includes six members elected to serve three-year terms on a staggered basis, with two seats coming up for election each year in a three-year cycle. The borough form of government used by South Toms River is a "weak mayor / strong council" government in which council members act as the legislative body with the mayor presiding at meetings and voting only in the event of a tie. The mayor can veto ordinances subject to an override by a two-thirds majority vote of the council. The mayor makes committee and liaison assignments for council members, and most appointments are made by the mayor with the advice and consent of the council.

As of 2023, the mayor of South Toms River Borough is Republican Oscar Cradle, whose term of office ends December 31, 2026. Members of the Borough Council are Council President Sandford Ross Jr. (R, 2026), Samuel S. Fennell (R, 2027), William Kosh(R, 2028), Edward F. Murray (R, 2026), Kayla Rolzhausen (R, 2027; appointed to serve an unexpired term) and Thomas R Rolzhausen (R, 2028).

In January 2023, Kayla Rolzhausen was appointed to fill the borough council seat expiring in December 2024 that had been held by Oscar Cradle and became vacant when he took office as mayor.

=== Federal, state, and county representation ===
South Toms River is located in the 4th Congressional District and is part of New Jersey's 10th state legislative district.

For the 119th United States Congress, New Jersey's 4th congressional district is represented by Chris Smith (R, Manchester Township). New Jersey is represented in the United States Senate by Democrats Cory Booker (Newark, term ends 2027) and Andy Kim (Moorestown, term ends 2031).

For the 2026–2027 session, the 10th legislative district of the New Jersey Legislature is represented in the State Senate by James W. Holzapfel (R, Toms River) and in the General Assembly by Paul Kanitra (R, Point Pleasant Beach) and Gregory P. McGuckin (R, Toms River).

Ocean County is governed by a Board of County Commissioners composed of five members who are elected on an at-large basis in partisan elections and serving staggered three-year terms of office, with either one or two seats coming up for election each year as part of the November general election. At an annual reorganization held in the beginning of January, the board chooses a director and a deputy director from among its members. As of 2025, Ocean County's Commissioners (with party affiliation, term-end year and residence) are:

John P. Kelly (R, 2025, Eagleswood Township), Virginia E. Haines (R, 2025, Toms River), Robert Arace (R, Manchester Township, 2027) Jennifer Bacchione (R, Berkeley Township, 2027) and Frank Sadeghi (R, 2026, Toms River).

Constitutional officers elected on a countywide basis are: Clerk Scott M. Colabella (R, 2025, Barnegat Light), Sheriff Michael G. Mastronardy (R, 2025; Toms River) and Surrogate Jeffrey Moran (R, 2028, Beachwood).

=== Politics ===
South Toms River voted for Democrat Joe Biden in the 2020 presidential election and was one of only two municipalities in Ocean County that incumbent Republican President Donald Trump didn’t win that year. As of March 2011, there were a total of 2,065 registered voters in South Toms River, of which 562 (27.2%) were registered as Democrats, 345 (16.7%) were registered as Republicans and 1,157 (56.0%) were registered as Unaffiliated. There was one voter registered to another party. Among the borough's 2010 Census population, 56.1% (vs. 63.2% in Ocean County) were registered to vote, including 77.9% of those ages 18 and over (vs. 82.6% countywide).

Gubernatorial election results for South Toms River
Year	Republican		Democratic		Third party(ies)	
Year	No.	%	No.	%	No.	%
2025	425	45.02%	507	53.71%	12	1.27%
2021	454	57.04%	334	41.96%	8	1.01%
2017	332	51.63%	291	45.26%	20	3.11%
2013	473	66.34%	227	31.84%	13	1.82%
2009	431	54.01%	302	37.84%	65	8.15%
2005	310	44.03%	355	50.43%	39	5.54%

In the 2012 presidential election, Democrat Barack Obama received 64.6% of the vote (802 cast), ahead of Republican Mitt Romney with 33.1% (411 votes), and other candidates with 2.3% (28 votes), among the 1,257 ballots cast by the borough's 2,149 registered voters (16 ballots were spoiled), for a turnout of 58.5%. In the 2008 presidential election, Democrat Barack Obama received 60.9% of the vote (879 cast), ahead of Republican John McCain with 36.9% (533 votes) and other candidates with 1.4% (20 votes), among the 1,443 ballots cast by the borough's 2,233 registered voters, for a turnout of 64.6%. In the 2004 presidential election, Republican George W. Bush received 49.1% of the vote (627 ballots cast), outpolling Democrat John Kerry with 48.6% (621 votes) and other candidates with 1.1% (22 votes), among the 1,277 ballots cast by the borough's 2,073 registered voters, for a turnout percentage of 61.6.

Presidential Elections Results
Year	Republican	Democratic	Third Parties
2024	52.2% 713	45.4% 620	2.4% 29
2020	46.1% 730	51.1% 810	2.8% 36
2016	48.9% 623	48.0% 611	3.1% 40
2012	33.1% 411	64.6% 802	2.3% 28
2008	36.9% 533	60.9% 879	1.4% 20
2004	49.1% 627	48.6% 621	1.1% 22

In the 2013 gubernatorial election, Republican Chris Christie received 66.3% of the vote (473 cast), ahead of Democrat Barbara Buono with 31.8% (227 votes), and other candidates with 1.8% (13 votes), among the 736 ballots cast by the borough's 2,072 registered voters (23 ballots were spoiled), for a turnout of 35.5%. In the 2009 gubernatorial election, Republican Chris Christie received 52.8% of the vote (431 ballots cast), ahead of Democrat Jon Corzine with 37.0% (302 votes), Independent Chris Daggett with 6.1% (50 votes) and other candidates with 1.8% (15 votes), among the 816 ballots cast by the borough's 2,157 registered voters, yielding a 37.8% turnout.

United States Senate election results for South Toms River1
Year	Republican		Democratic		Third party(ies)	
Year	No.	%	No.	%	No.	%
2024	627	49.68%	614	48.65%	21	1.66%
2018	464	48.13%	448	46.47%	52	5.39%
2012	407	34.58%	743	63.13%	27	2.29%
2006	321	45.92%	341	48.78%	37	5.29%

United States Senate election results for South Toms River2
Year	Republican		Democratic		Third party(ies)	
Year	No.	%	No.	%	No.	%
2020	677	44.39%	797	52.26%	51	3.34%
2014	292	37.92%	455	59.09%	23	2.99%
2013	195	46.43%	221	52.62%	4	0.95%
2008	464	36.08%	798	62.05%	24	1.87%

== Education ==
Public school students in kindergarten through twelfth grade attend the Toms River Regional Schools, a regional public school district based primarily in Toms River Township that also serves students from Beachwood, Pine Beach and South Toms River. The district's board of education has nine members; seats are allocated based on population, with one seat allocated to South Toms River. As of the 2018–19 school year, the district, comprised of 18 schools, had an enrollment of 15,472 students and 1,171.6 classroom teachers (on an FTE basis), for a student–teacher ratio of 13.2:1.

== Transportation ==
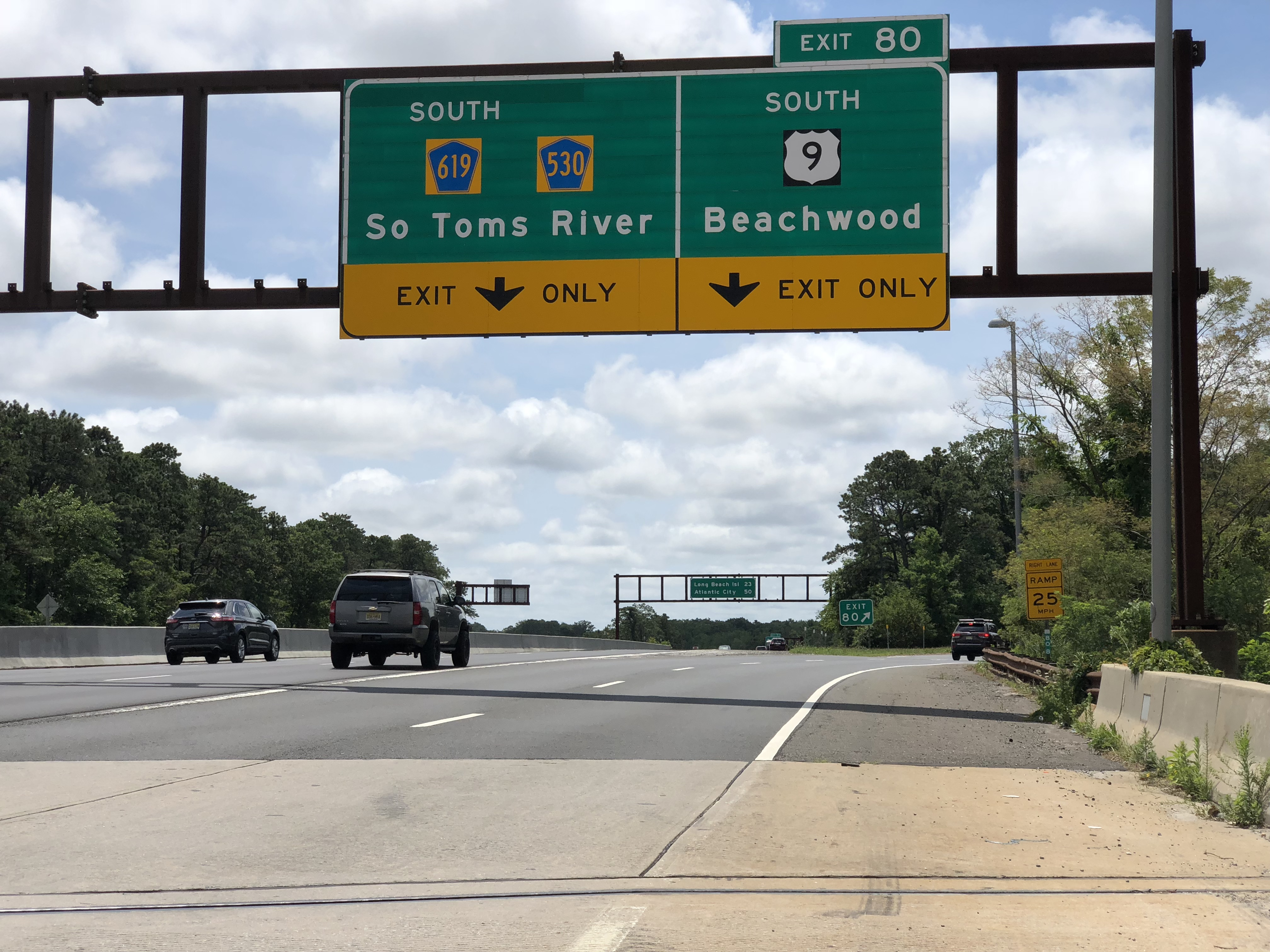
The southbound Garden State Parkway at Exit 80 in South Toms River

=== Roads and highways ===
As of May 2010, the borough had a total of 16.49 miles (26.54 km) of roadways, of which 9.86 miles (15.87 km) were maintained by the municipality, 4.48 miles (7.21 km) by Ocean County and 1.34 miles (2.16 km) by the New Jersey Department of Transportation and 0.81 miles (1.30 km) by the New Jersey Turnpike Authority.

The Garden State Parkway bisects the borough, connecting Beachwood to the south and Berkeley Township to the north, and includes Interchange 80. U.S. Route 9 heads from Beachwood to the east and begins a concurrency with the Garden State Parkway at exit 80. County Route 530 (Dover Road / South Main Street) traverses the borough from Berkeley Township to the southwest to its eastern terminus just over the border with Toms River Township. Route 166 (Main Street) clips the northeastern corner of the borough, running from Beachwood in the south to Toms River in the north.

=== Public transportation ===
NJ Transit provides bus service between the borough and Atlantic City on the 559 bus route.
