= Berkeley Township, New Jersey =

Township in Ocean County, New Jersey, US

- Township
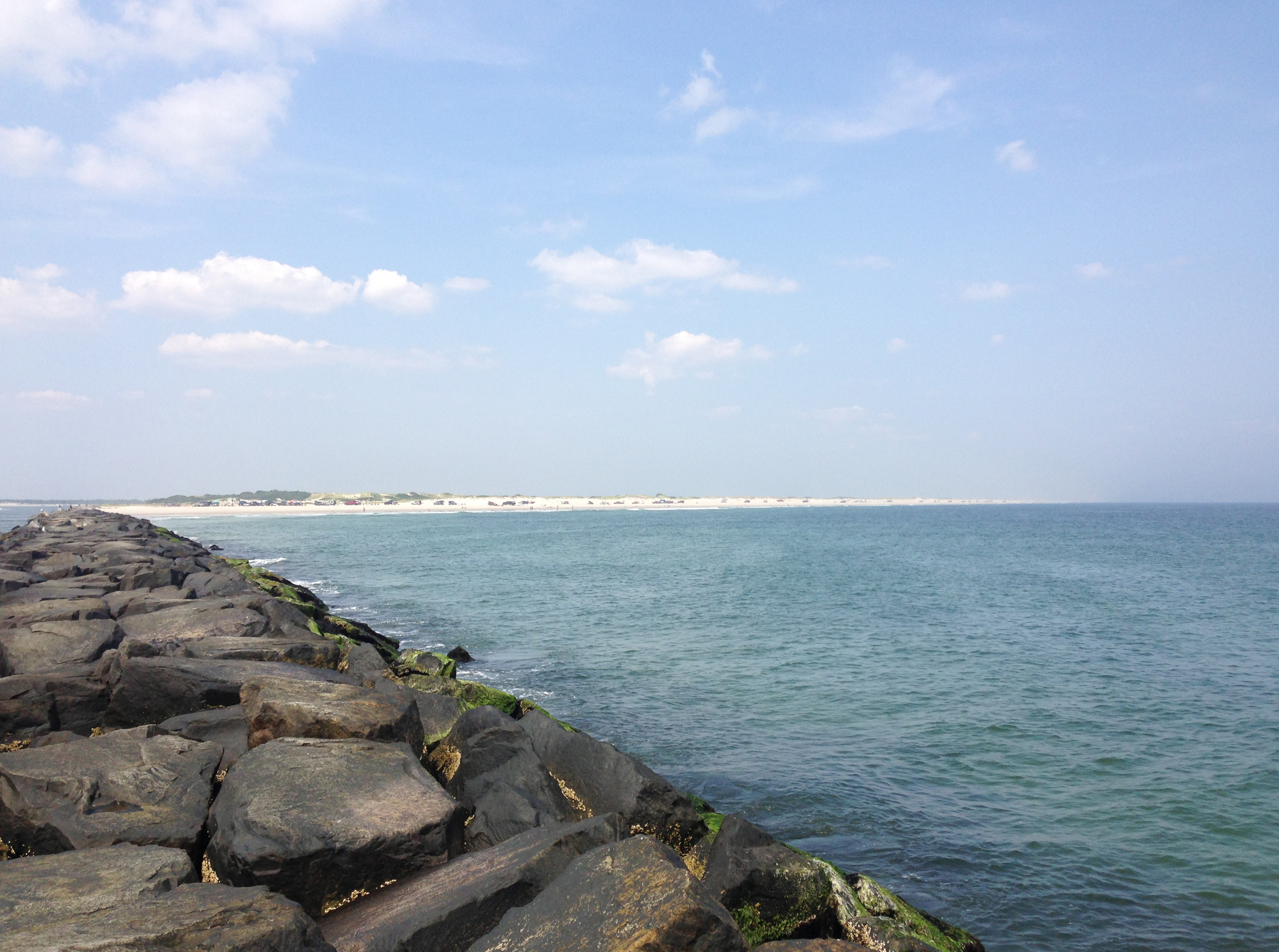
- Island Beach State Park in Berkeley Township

- Seal
- Motto: "From the shores of the Atlantic Ocean to the serenity of the Pine Barrens"
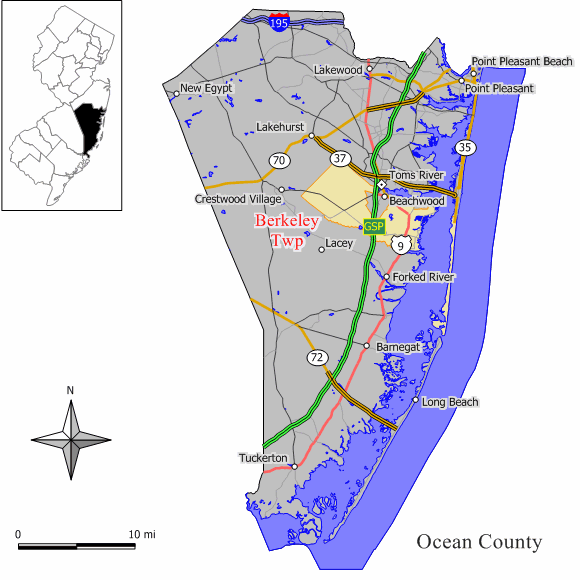
- Location of Berkeley Township in Ocean County highlighted in yellow (right). Inset map: Location of Ocean County in New Jersey highlighted in black (left).

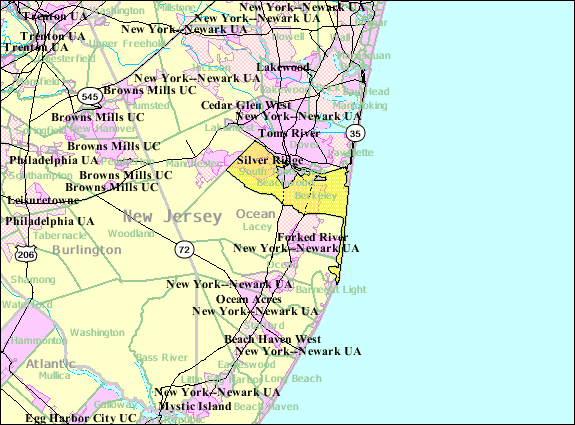
- Census Bureau map of Berkeley Township, New Jersey

- Location in Ocean County Location in New Jersey Location in the United States
- Coordinates: 39.912906°N 74.193095°W
- Country: United States
- State: New Jersey
- County: Ocean
- Incorporated: March 31, 1875
- Named for: John Berkeley, 1st Baron Berkeley of Stratton

Government
  - Type: Faulkner Act (mayor–council)
  - Body: Township Council
  - Mayor: John A. Bacchione (R, term ends December 31, 2027)
  - Administrator: Jay Delaney
  - Municipal clerk: Karen Stallings

Area
  - Total: 54.25 sq mi (140.51 km^{2})
  - Land: 42.72 sq mi (110.64 km^{2})
  - Water: 11.53 sq mi (29.87 km^{2}) 21.26%
  - Rank: 31st of 565 in state 6th of 33 in county
- Elevation: 36 ft (11 m)

Population (2020)
  - Total: 43,754
  - Estimate (2023): 44,856
  - Rank: 51st of 565 in state 6th of 33 in county
  - Density: 1,024.4/sq mi (395.5/km^{2})
  - Rank: 382nd of 565 in state 20th of 33 in county
- Time zone: UTC−05:00 (Eastern (EST))
  - Summer (DST): UTC−04:00 (Eastern (EDT))
- ZIP Code: 08721
- Area codes: 732 exchanges: 237, 269, 606
- FIPS code: 3402905305
- GNIS feature ID: 0882073
- Website: www.berkeleytownship.org

Berkeley Township is a township in Ocean County, in the U.S. state of New Jersey, extending from the Jersey Shore westward into the New Jersey Pine Barrens. As of the 2020 United States census, the township's population was 43,754, the highest ever in any decennial count and an increase of 2,499 (+6.1%) from the 2010 census count of 41,255, which in turn reflected an increase of 1,264 (+3.2%) from the 39,991 counted in the 2000 census.

Berkeley Township was incorporated as a township by an act of the New Jersey Legislature on March 31, 1875, from portions of Dover Township (now Toms River Township). Sections of the township were taken to form Seaside Park (March 3, 1898), Seaside Heights (February 6, 1913), Beachwood (March 22, 1917), Ocean Gate (February 28, 1918) Pine Beach (February 26, 1925), South Toms River (March 28, 1927), and Island Beach (June 23, 1933, reabsorbed into Berkeley Township in 1965). The township was named for John Berkeley, 1st Baron Berkeley of Stratton, one of the founders of the Province of New Jersey.

== History ==
Army officer Lt. Edward Farrow began buying up woodland in the 1880s with the idea of building a retirement community for former Army and Navy officers. Farrow built a railroad station, shops and even a resort hotel called The Pines with the idea of attracting people. But only 11 people ever built houses in what Farrow called "Barnegat Park," and eventually he went bankrupt.

In the 1920s, Benjamin W. Sangor purchased the area, intending to create a resort town catering to wealthy urban vacationers. Between 1928 and 1929, about 8,000 lots were sold in Pinewald, a "new-type, residential, recreational city-of-the sea-and-pines." It was to contain a golf course, recreation facilities, and estate homes.

The developers immediately began construction of the Pinewald pavilion and pier at the end of Butler Avenue. The Royal Pines Hotel, a $1.175 million investment facing Crystal Lake, was built on the site of an earlier hotel dating back to the days of Barnegat Park. It was the focal point of the new community. The hotel was also used as an asylum, then later a nursing home now known as the Crystal Lake Nursing & Rehabilitation Center.

The hotel was constructed by Russian architect W. Oltar-Jevsky in the early 1920s. Al Capone may have frequented its halls, perhaps even venturing beneath the lake in tunnels especially designed for smuggling alcohol during Prohibition. One newspaper article interviewed an unidentified man who claimed that "in the early 1930s the then Royal Pines Hotel was frequented by society's elite who, for $1.90 a drink, consumed prohibition liquor under the watchful eye of men who had guns strapped under their coats." In 1929, during the Great Depression, this resort community also went bankrupt.

In September 2014 residents of the South Seaside Park neighborhood of Berkeley Township submitted a petition to move from the township and become a part of the borough of Seaside Park, arguing that the neighborhood was 16 miles (26 km) away from the township's municipal offices and that there were minimal social connections with the rest of Berkeley Township. In 2025, the New Jersey Supreme Court approved the petition and agreed that South Seaside Park may leave the township and join Seaside Park borough.

== Geography ==
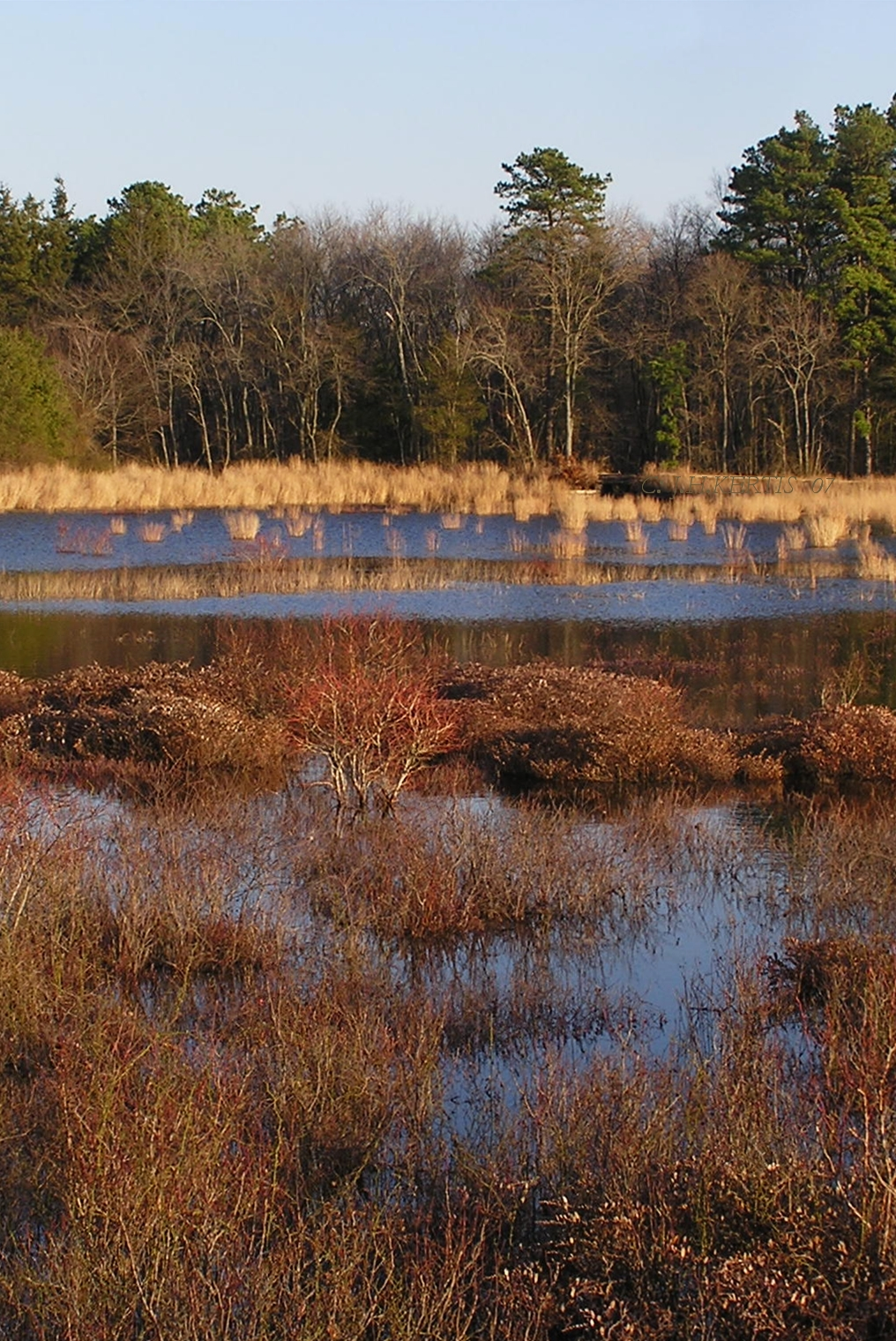
A cranberry bog within Double Trouble State Park, which straddles Berkeley Township and a smaller portion within neighboring Lacey Township in Ocean County

According to the United States Census Bureau, the township had a total area of 54.25 square miles (140.51 km^{2}), including 42.72 square miles (110.64 km^{2}) of land and 11.53 square miles (29.87 km^{2}) of water (21.26%).

The township is located in the central part of Ocean County along the Atlantic Ocean and Barnegat Bay, which is part of the Intracoastal Waterway.

Approximately 72% of the township's land area is within the federally designated Pinelands National Reserve and 38% is within the State's Pineland Area, which is within the Pinelands National Reserve. Toms River forms the northern border of the township, Cedar Creek and Lacey Township form the southern border. The barrier island, on which South Seaside Park and Island Beach State Park are situated, is the township's eastern boundary.

Holiday City-Berkeley (2010 Census population of 12,831), Holiday City South (3,689 as of 2010), Holiday Heights (2,099) and Silver Ridge (1,133) are unincorporated communities and census-designated places located within Berkeley Township. The four CDPs are parts of Holiday City – Silver Ridge Park, an age-restricted adult planned community with separate communities, each with its own homeowners association and amenities.

Other unincorporated communities, localities and place names located wholly or partially within the township include Barnegat Park, Barnegat Pier, Bayville, Benders Corners, Berkeley Heights, Crossley, Double Trouble, Dover Forge, Glen Cove, Glenside Park, Good Luck Point, Holly Park, Manitou Park, Pelican Island, Pinewald, River Bank, Silver Ridge Park, Silver Ridge Park West, South Seaside Park, Stony Hill, Union Village, Sylvan Lake, Berkeley Suburbs and Zebs Bridge.

The township borders the Ocean County communities of Barnegat Light, Beachwood, Island Heights, Lacey Township, Manchester Township, Ocean Township, Pine Beach, Seaside Heights, Seaside Park, South Toms River and Toms River; The township completely surrounds the borough of Ocean Gate.

The township is one of 11 municipalities in Ocean County that are part of the Toms River watershed.

== Demographics ==
Historical population
Census	Pop.	Note	%±
1880	683		—
1890	786		15.1%
1900	694	*	−11.7%
1910	597		−14.0%
1920	576	*	−3.5%
1930	811	*	40.8%
1940	1,127		39.0%
1950	1,550		37.5%
1960	4,272		175.6%
1970	7,918		85.3%
1980	23,151		192.4%
1990	37,319		61.2%
2000	39,991		7.2%
2010	41,255		3.2%
2020	43,754		6.1%
2023 (est.)	44,856		2.5%
Population sources: 1880–2000; 1880–1920 1880–1890; 1890–1910 1910–1930; 1940–2000 2000; 2010 2020 * = Lost territory in previous decade.

=== 2010 census ===
The 2010 United States census counted 41,255 people, 20,349 households, and 11,538 families in the township. The population density was 962.5 per square mile (371.6/km^{2}). There were 23,818 housing units at an average density of 555.7 per square mile (214.6/km^{2}). The racial makeup was 94.85% (39,129) White, 1.75% (723) Black or African American, 0.11% (46) Native American, 1.13% (466) Asian, 0.01% (5) Pacific Islander, 1.13% (465) from other races, and 1.02% (421) from two or more races. Hispanic or Latino of any race were 4.92% (2,028) of the population.

Of the 20,349 households, 12.2% had children under the age of 18; 45.8% were married couples living together; 8.0% had a female householder with no husband present and 43.3% were non-families. Of all households, 39.3% were made up of individuals and 30.0% had someone living alone who was 65 years of age or older. The average household size was 2.00 and the average family size was 2.63.

11.9% of the population were under the age of 18, 4.6% from 18 to 24, 15.3% from 25 to 44, 24.9% from 45 to 64, and 43.4% who were 65 years of age or older. The median age was 61.1 years. For every 100 females, the population had 81.5 males. For every 100 females ages 18 and older there were 78.6 males.

The Census Bureau's 2006–2010 American Community Survey showed that (in 2010 inflation-adjusted dollars) median household income was $43,049 (with a margin of error of +/− $1,988) and the median family income was $58,230 (+/− $2,406). Males had a median income of $54,959 (+/− $3,373) versus $40,935 (+/− $2,531) for females. The per capita income for the borough was $28,168 (+/− $1,017). About 5.2% of families and 7.2% of the population were below the poverty line, including 8.7% of those under age 18 and 7.8% of those age 65 or over.

=== 2000 census ===
As of the 2000 United States census there were 39,991 people, 19,828 households, and 12,174 families residing in the township. The population density was 932.3 inhabitants per square mile (360.0/km^{2}). There were 22,288 housing units at an average density of 519.6 per square mile (200.6/km^{2}). The racial makeup of the township was 97.10% White, 1.30% African American, 0.04% Native American, 0.45% Asian, 0.01% Pacific Islander, 0.43% from other races, and 0.66% from two or more races. Hispanic or Latino of any race were 2.33% of the population.

There were 19,828 households, out of which 11.1% had children under the age of 18 living with them, 53.1% were married couples living together, 6.2% had a female householder with no husband present, and 38.6% were non-families. 35.9% of all households were made up of individuals, and 29.8% had someone living alone who was 65 years of age or older. The average household size was 1.99 and the average family size was 2.52.

In the township the population was spread out, with 11.4% under the age of 18, 3.6% from 18 to 24, 14.7% from 25 to 44, 18.3% from 45 to 64, and 52.0% who were 65 years of age or older. The median age was 66 years. For every 100 females, there were 79.9 males. For every 100 females age 18 and over, there were 77.1 males.

The median income for a household in the township was $32,134, and the median income for a family was $40,208. Males had a median income of $41,643 versus $28,640 for females. The per capita income for the township was $22,198. About 3.4% of families and 5.4% of the population were below the poverty line, including 5.1% of those under age 18 and 5.9% of those age 65 or over.

== Government ==
=== Local government ===
Since July 1, 1983, Berkeley Township has been governed within the Faulkner Act, formally known as the Optional Municipal Charter Law, under the Mayor-Council system of municipal government plan D, as adopted based on direct petition. The township is one of 71 municipalities (of the 564) statewide that use this form of government. The governing body is comprised of the Mayor and the seven-member Township Council, which has three members elected at-large and one member elected from each of the four wards. The mayor and the members of the Township Council are elected to four-year terms of office on a partisan basis in staggered elections held as part of the November election in odd-numbered years, with the respective terms commencing on January 1; the mayor and the three at-large seats come up for election together every four years, with the four ward seats up for election two years later.

As of 2025, the Mayor of Berkeley Township is Republican John A. Bacchione, whose term of office ends December 31, 2027. Members of the Berkeley Township Council are Council President Angelo Guadagno (Ward 2; R, 2025), Council Vice President Michael Signorile (Ward 3; R, 2025), Douglas E. Bowens (at-large; R, 2027), Keith A. Buscio (at-large; R, 2027), James J. Byrnes (Ward 1; R, 2025), Sophia Gingrich (Ward 4; R, 2025) and L. Thomas Grosse Jr. (at-large; R, 2027).

In September 2020, the Township Council appointed Michael Signorile to fill the seat running through December 2021 that had been held by Judy Noonan until she resigned from office as she was moving out of the township. Signorile served on an interim basis until the November 2021 general election, when he was elected to serve the balance of the term of office.

In January 2015, the Township Council selected Anthony DePaola from among three candidates recommended by the municipal Republican committee to fill the at-large seat that expiring in 2015 that had been held by Robert G. Ray, who had resigned earlier that month.

In November 2012, James J. Byrnes and Kevin M. Askew won the remaining 14 months on unexpired terms of office. Byrnes had been appointed to the Ward 1 seat to fill the vacancy of Karen Davis following her resignation from office, while Askew had been appointed to fill the vacancy of Carmen F. Amato Jr. in Ward 2 after he had taken office as the township's mayor.

=== Federal, state, and county representation ===
Berkeley Township is located in the 2nd and 4th Congressional District and is part of New Jersey's 9th state legislative district.

For the 119th United States Congress, New Jersey's 2nd congressional district is represented by Jeff Van Drew (R, Dennis Township). For the 119th United States Congress, New Jersey's 4th congressional district is represented by Chris Smith (R, Manchester Township). New Jersey is represented in the United States Senate by Democrats Cory Booker (Newark, term ends 2027) and Andy Kim (Moorestown, term ends 2031).

For the 2026–2027 session, the 9th legislative district of the New Jersey Legislature is represented in the State Senate by Carmen Amato (R, Berkeley Township) and in the General Assembly by Greg Myhre (R, Stafford Township) and Brian E. Rumpf (R, Little Egg Harbor Township).

Ocean County is governed by a Board of County Commissioners composed of five members who are elected on an at-large basis in partisan elections and serving staggered three-year terms of office, with either one or two seats coming up for election each year as part of the November general election. At an annual reorganization held in the beginning of January, the board chooses a director and a deputy director from among its members. As of 2025, Ocean County's Commissioners (with party affiliation, term-end year and residence) are:

John P. Kelly (R, 2025, Eagleswood Township), Virginia E. Haines (R, 2025, Toms River), Robert Arace (R, Manchester Township, 2027) Jennifer Bacchione (R, Berkeley Township, 2027) and Frank Sadeghi (R, 2026, Toms River).

Constitutional officers elected on a countywide basis are: Clerk Scott M. Colabella (R, 2025, Barnegat Light), Sheriff Michael G. Mastronardy (R, 2025; Toms River) and Surrogate Jeffrey Moran (R, 2028, Beachwood).

=== Politics ===
As of March 2011, there were a total of 30,403 registered voters in Berkeley Township, of which 8,348 (27.5%) were registered as Democrats, 7,946 (26.1%) were registered as Republicans and 14,095 (46.4%) were registered as Unaffiliated. There were 14 voters registered as Libertarians or Greens. Among the township's 2010 Census population, 73.7% (vs. 63.2% in Ocean County) were registered to vote, including 83.6% of those ages 18 and over (vs. 82.6% countywide).

Gubernatorial election results for Berkeley Township
Year	Republican		Democratic		Third party(ies)	
Year	No.	%	No.	%	No.	%
2025	14,527	63.53%	8,245	36.06%	93	0.41%
2021	13,151	69.18%	5,746	30.23%	113	0.59%
2017	9,438	68.14%	4,102	29.62%	310	2.24%
2013	11,301	77.49%	3,102	21.27%	181	1.24%
2009	11,112	63.27%	5,464	31.11%	986	5.61%
2005	8,251	48.60%	8,120	47.82%	608	3.58%

In the 2012 presidential election, Republican Mitt Romney received 56.5% of the vote (11,858 cast), ahead of Democrat Barack Obama with 42.5% (8,931 votes), and other candidates with 1.0% (202 votes), among the 21,208 ballots cast by the township's 31,431 registered voters (217 ballots were spoiled), for a turnout of 67.5%. In the 2008 presidential election, Republican John McCain received 57.3% of the vote (13,617 cast), ahead of Democrat Barack Obama with 40.3% (9,564 votes) and other candidates with 1.2% (295 votes), among the 23,761 ballots cast by the township's 32,340 registered voters, for a turnout of 73.5%. In the 2004 presidential election, Republican George W. Bush received 54.5% of the vote (12,862 ballots cast), outpolling Democrat John Kerry with 44.3% (10,442 votes) and other candidates with 0.6% (201 votes), among the 23,593 ballots cast by the township's 31,675 registered voters, for a turnout percentage of 74.5.

Presidential Elections Results
Year	Republican	Democratic	Third Parties
2024	65.5% 18,572	33.2% 9,409	1.3% 245
2020	63.6% 18,146	35.0% 9,976	1.4% 322
2016	66.5% 15,201	31.1% 7,108	2.5% 563
2012	56.5% 11,858	42.5% 8,931	1.0% 202
2008	57.3% 13,617	40.3% 9,564	1.3% 295
2004	54.5% 12,862	44.3% 10,442	0.6% 201

In the 2013 gubernatorial election, Republican Chris Christie received 77.5% of the vote (11,301 cast), ahead of Democrat Barbara Buono with 21.3% (3,102 votes), and other candidates with 1.2% (181 votes), among the 14,992 ballots cast by the township's 31,059 registered voters (408 ballots were spoiled), for a turnout of 48.3%. In the 2009 gubernatorial election, Republican Chris Christie received 62.3% of the vote (11,112 ballots cast), ahead of Democrat Jon Corzine with 30.6% (5,464 votes), Independent Chris Daggett with 4.5% (811 votes) and other candidates with 1.0% (175 votes), among the 17,838 ballots cast by the township's 31,397 registered voters, yielding a 56.8% turnout.

United States Senate election results for Berkeley Township1
Year	Republican		Democratic		Third party(ies)	
Year	No.	%	No.	%	No.	%
2024	16,612	62.61%	9,704	36.57%	216	0.81%
2018	12,472	65.90%	5,943	31.40%	511	2.70%
2012	10,988	55.44%	8,515	42.96%	318	1.60%
2006	8,059	52.52%	6,856	44.68%	430	2.80%

United States Senate election results for Berkeley Township2
Year	Republican		Democratic		Third party(ies)	
Year	No.	%	No.	%	No.	%
2020	17,361	63.10%	9,777	35.53%	377	1.37%
2014	6,952	58.69%	4,593	38.77%	301	2.54%
2013	6,371	64.54%	3,414	34.58%	87	0.88%
2008	11,781	54.13%	9,603	44.12%	381	1.75%

== Education ==
The Berkeley Township School District serves public school students in pre-kindergarten through sixth grade. As of the 2024–25 school year, the district, comprised of four schools, had an enrollment of 2,385 students and 206.0 classroom teachers (on an FTE basis), for a student–teacher ratio of 11.6:1. Schools in the district (with 2024–25 enrollment data from the National Center for Education Statistics) are Bayville Elementary School with 475 students in grades PreK–4, H. & M. Potter Elementary School with 627 students in grades PreK–4, Clara B. Worth Elementary School with 666 students in grades PreK–4 and Berkeley Township Elementary School with 594 students in grades 5–6.

With the closure of the lone school of the Ocean Gate School District at the end of the 2025–26 school year, the district established a five-year sending agreement with the Berkeley Township School District to educate students from Ocean Gate. Students in grades pre-kindergarten through 4 were zoned to H&M Potter School while students in grades 5-6 would be sent to Berkeley Township Elementary School.

Public school students in seventh through twelfth grades attend the schools of the Central Regional School District, which serves students from Berkeley Township and from the municipalities of Island Heights, Ocean Gate, Seaside Heights and Seaside Park. Schools in the high school district (with 2024–25 enrollment data from the National Center for Education Statistics) are Central Regional Middle School with 680 students in grades 7–8 and Central Regional High School with 1,489 students in grades 9–12. The high school district's board of education consists of nine members, who are directly elected by the residents of the constituent municipalities to three-year terms of office on a staggered basis, with three seats up for election each year. Berkeley Township is allocated five of the board's nine seats.

== Media ==
The Asbury Park Press provides daily news coverage of the township, as does WOBM-FM radio. The township provides material and commentary to The Berkeley Times, which also covers news from Beachwood, Ocean Gate, Pine Beach and South Toms River as one of seven weekly papers from Micromedia Publications.

WOBM-FM radio started broadcasting from Bayville in March 1968. The station relocated to studios in Toms River in 2013.

== Transportation ==
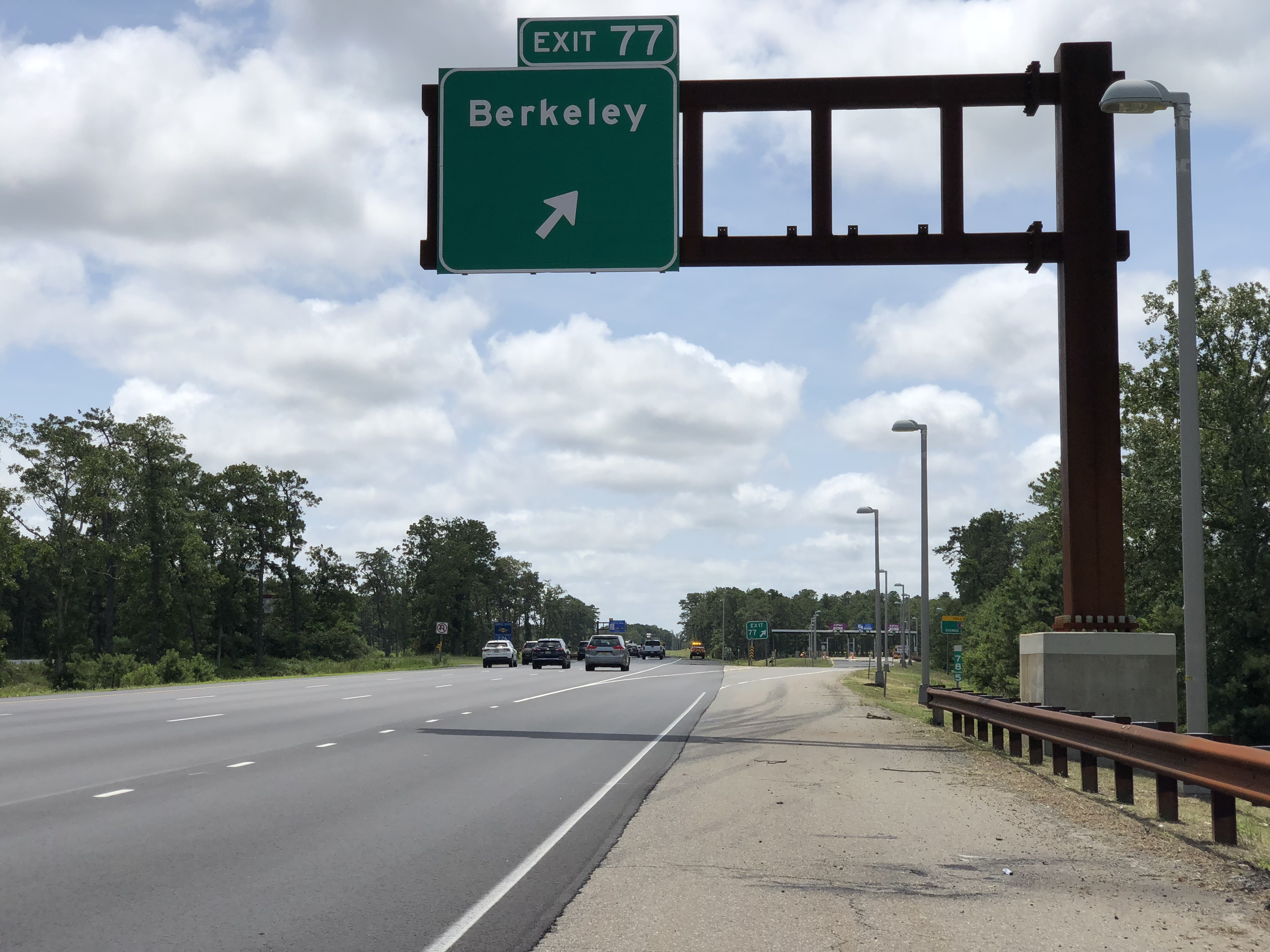
The southbound Garden State Parkway in Berkeley Township

=== Roads and highways ===
As of May 2010, the township had a total of 266.02 miles (428.12 km) of roadways, of which 220.88 miles (355.47 km) were maintained by the municipality, 36.64 miles (58.97 km) by The Ocean County Road Dept., 6.27 miles (10.09 km) by the New Jersey Department of Transportation and 2.23 miles (3.59 km) by the New Jersey Turnpike Authority.

The Garden State Parkway is the primary access route, with two exits, exit 77 and exit 80 serving the township. U.S. Route 9 runs through the eastern-middle part of the municipality while Route 35 passes through briefly and ends at the park road for Island Beach State Park. A small section of Route 37 also passes through Berkeley Township, near its junction with Route 35.

=== Public transportation ===
NJ Transit offers local bus service between the township and Atlantic City on the 559 route.

Ocean Ride service is provided on routes OC1, OC2, OC7 and OC8.

== Notable people ==
People who were born in, residents of, or otherwise closely associated with Berkeley Township include:

- Carmen Amato, politician who has represented the 9th legislative district in the New Jersey Senate, after serving for more than a decade as mayor of Berkeley Township
- Tom DeBlass (born 1982), practitioner of Brazilian Jiu-Jitsu and mixed martial artist signed with ONE Championship
- Jazmyn Foberg (born 2000), artistic gymnast who was the 2014 US Junior National All-Around and Uneven Bars Champion
- Al Leiter (born 1965), former MLB pitcher who played for both the New York Mets and New York Yankees
- Mark Leiter (born 1963), retired Major League Baseball pitcher
- Phil Longo (born 1968), American football coach who is head coach for the Sam Houston Bearkats football team
- Megan McCafferty (born 1973), author best known for her series of books about Jessica Darling, a witty teenage heroine
- Herbert Irving Preston (1876–1928), private serving in the United States Marine Corps who received the Medal of Honor for bravery during the Boxer Rebellion
- Augusta Huiell Seaman (1879–1950), author of children's literature
