= Herbert Irving Preston =

United States Marine Corps Medal of Honor recipient

- Born: August 6, 1876; Berkeley, New Jersey
- Died: December 8, 1928 (aged 52); Norwalk Harbor, Connecticut, U.S.
- Military career
- Allegiance: United States
- Branch: United States Marine Corps
- Service years: 1899–1901
- Rank: Private
- Conflicts: Boxer Rebellion
- Awards: Medal of Honor

Herbert I. Preston (August 6, 1876 – December 8, 1928) was an American private serving in the United States Marine Corps during the Boxer Rebellion who received the Medal of Honor for bravery.

== Biography ==
Preston was born August 6, 1876, in Berkeley Township, New Jersey and enlisted into the Marine Corps from Philadelphia, Pennsylvania June 29, 1899. After entering the Marine Corps he was sent to fight in the Chinese Boxer Rebellion.

He received the Medal for his actions in Peking, China from July 21 – August 17, 1900 and it was presented to him July 19, 1901.

== Medal of Honor citation ==
Rank and organization: Private, U.S. Marine Corps. Born: 6 August 1876, Berkeley, N.J. Accredited to: New Jersey G.O. No.: 55, 19 July 1901.

Citation:

In the presence of the enemy during the action at Peking, China, 21 July to 17 August 1900. Throughout this period, Preston distinguished himself by meritorious conduct.

== See also ==
- List of Medal of Honor recipients
- List of Medal of Honor recipients for the Boxer Rebellion
