= Jetur R. Riggs =

American politician

Jetur Rose Riggs

Member of the U.S. House of Representatives from New Jersey's 4th district
- In office March 4, 1859 – March 3, 1861
- Preceded by: John Huyler
- Succeeded by: George T. Cobb

Member of the New Jersey Senate for Passaic County
- In office 1856–1859
- Preceded by: Thomas D. Hoxsey
- Succeeded by: Benjamin Buckley

Personal details
- Born: June 20, 1809 Ledgewood, New Jersey
- Died: November 5, 1869 (aged 60) Ledgewood, New Jersey
- Party: Anti-Lecompton Democratic
- Profession: politician

Jetur Rose Riggs (June 20, 1809 – November 5, 1869) was an American Anti-Lecompton Democrat who represented New Jersey's 4th congressional district in the U.S. representative for one term from 1859 to 1861.

== Early life and career ==
Born near Drakesville (now known as the Ledgewood section of Roxbury Township), Morris County, Riggs received an academic education. He graduated from the New York College of Physicians and Surgeons in 1837 and commenced practice in Newfoundland, New Jersey.

=== New Jersey assembly ===
He served as member of the New Jersey General Assembly in 1836. He was one of the founders of the District Medical Society of Passaic County, in 1844 and served as president 1846–1848. He moved to California during the California Gold Rush in 1849 and was in charge of the hospital at Sutter's Fort. He returned to New Jersey and settled in Paterson in 1852. He served as member of the New Jersey Senate in 1855–1858.

== Congress ==
Riggs was elected as an Anti-Lecompton Democrat to the Thirty-sixth Congress, serving in office from March 4, 1859 – March 3, 1861, but was not a candidate for renomination in 1860.

== Later career and death ==
After leaving Congress, he resumed the practice of medicine in Paterson, later moved to Drakesville (now Ledgewood), New Jersey, and died there November 5, 1869.

He was interred in the Presbyterian Cemetery, Succasunna, New Jersey.

U.S. House of Representatives
Preceded by John Huyler	Member of the U.S. House of Representatives from New Jersey's 4th congressional district March 4, 1859—March 3, 1861	Succeeded by George T. Cobb
