= Holiday City-Berkeley, New Jersey =

Populated place in Ocean County, New Jersey, US

- Census-designated place
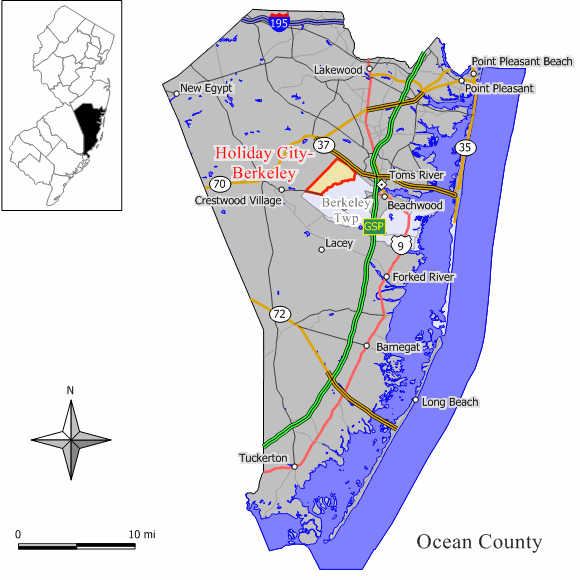
- Map of Holiday City-Berkeley CDP in Ocean County. Inset: Location of Ocean County in New Jersey.

- Location in Ocean County Location in New Jersey Location in the United States
- Coordinates: 39.964154°N 74.277814°W
- Country: United States
- State: New Jersey
- County: Ocean
- Township: Berkeley

Area
  - Total: 6.03 sq mi (15.62 km^{2})
  - Land: 5.97 sq mi (15.45 km^{2})
  - Water: 0.062 sq mi (0.16 km^{2}) 1.09%
- Elevation: 43 ft (13 m)

Population (2020)
  - Total: 12,943
  - Density: 2,169.3/sq mi (837.57/km^{2})
- Time zone: UTC−05:00 (Eastern (EST))
  - Summer (DST): UTC−04:00 (Eastern (EDT))
- Area codes: 609, 732/848
- FIPS code: 34-32415
- GNIS feature ID: 02389942

Holiday City-Berkeley is an unincorporated community and census-designated place (CDP) located within Berkeley Township, in Ocean County, in the U.S. state of New Jersey. As of the 2020 census, Holiday City-Berkeley had a population of 12,943.

Holiday City-Berkeley is a retirement community where residents must be over the age of 55 to own property and participate in community recreational activities.

== Neighborhoods ==
=== Holiday City ===
In the Holiday City communities, homes are detached, ranch style built on minimum 50' x 100' lots, with some lots being larger to accommodate larger models.

Holiday City consists of five separate communities, each with its own homeowners association and amenities:

- Holiday City Berkeley
- Holiday City Carefree
- Holiday City West
- Holiday City South
- Holiday Heights

=== Silver Ridge ===
In the Silver Ridge Communities, homes are single-story detached on a crawl space, each with attached garage, and situated on lots measuring 60 by 100 feet (18 m × 30 m). Floor plans vary considerably. In addition to living room, dining room, eat-in-kitchen, attached garage, one or two bedrooms and one or two bathrooms, homes may also include family rooms/dens, open or closed porches, sun rooms, patios and decks.

The adult communities of Silver Ridge Park consist of four separate areas, each with its own homeowners association and amenities. These are:

- Silver Ridge Park East
- Silver Ridge Park West
- Silver Ridge Park - Westerly Extension
- Silver Ridge Park North

== Geography ==
According to the United States Census Bureau, the CDP had a total area of 5.816 square miles (15.06 km^{2}), including 5.752 square miles (14.90 km^{2}) of land and 0.064 square miles (0.17 km^{2}) of water (1.09%).

== Demographics ==
Historical population
Census	Pop.	Note	%±
1980	9,019		—
1990	14,293		58.5%
2000	13,884		−2.9%
2010	12,831		−7.6%
2020	12,943		0.9%
Population sources: 1960-1980; 1950 1960 1970; 1980 1990 2000; 2010 2020

Holiday City-Berkeley first appeared as a census designated place in the 1980 U.S. census.

=== Racial and ethnic composition ===
Holiday City-Berkeley CDP, New Jersey – Racial and ethnic composition Note: the US Census treats Hispanic/Latino as an ethnic category. This table excludes Latinos from the racial categories and assigns them to a separate category. Hispanics/Latinos may be of any race.
Race / Ethnicity (NH = Non-Hispanic)	Pop 2000	Pop 2010	Pop 2020	% 2000	% 2010	% 2020
White alone (NH)	13,608	12,287	11,941	98.01%	95.76%	92.26%
Black or African American alone (NH)	53	87	155	0.38%	0.68%	1.20%
Native American or Alaska Native alone (NH)	0	8	8	0.00%	0.06%	0.06%
Asian alone (NH)	28	92	113	0.20%	0.72%	0.87%
Native Hawaiian or Pacific Islander alone (NH)	1	0	2	0.01%	0.00%	0.02%
Other race alone (NH)	2	5	24	0.01%	0.04%	0.19%
Mixed race or Multiracial (NH)	41	44	170	0.30%	0.34%	1.31%
Hispanic or Latino (any race)	151	308	530	1.09%	2.40%	4.09%
Total	13,884	12,831	12,943	100.00%	100.00%	100.00%

=== 2020 census ===
As of the 2020 census, Holiday City-Berkeley had a population of 12,943. The median age was 70.6 years. 0.7% of residents were under the age of 18 and 68.7% of residents were 65 years of age or older. For every 100 females there were 72.8 males, and for every 100 females age 18 and over there were 72.6 males age 18 and over.

100.0% of residents lived in urban areas, while 0.0% lived in rural areas.

There were 8,035 households in Holiday City-Berkeley, of which 1.3% had children under the age of 18 living in them. Of all households, 35.5% were married-couple households, 17.6% were households with a male householder and no spouse or partner present, and 43.0% were households with a female householder and no spouse or partner present. About 48.3% of all households were made up of individuals and 39.4% had someone living alone who was 65 years of age or older.

There were 9,012 housing units, of which 10.8% were vacant. The homeowner vacancy rate was 3.7% and the rental vacancy rate was 2.9%.

=== 2010 census ===
The 2010 United States census counted 12,831 people, 8,152 households, and 3,693 families in the CDP. The population density was 2,230.6 people per square mile (861.2 people/km^{2}). There were 9,023 housing units at an average density of 1,568.6 units per square mile (605.6 units/km^{2}). The racial makeup was 97.77% (12,545) White, 0.72% (92) Black or African American, 0.07% (9) Native American, 0.72% (93) Asian, 0.00% (0) Pacific Islander, 0.27% (35) from other races, and 0.44% (57) from two or more races. Hispanic or Latino of any race were 2.40% (308) of the population.

Of the 8,152 households, 0.0% had children under the age of 18; 37.4% were married couples living together; 6.2% had a female householder with no husband present and 54.7% were non-families. Of all households, 51.2% were made up of individuals and 42.8% had someone living alone who was 65 years of age or older. The average household size was 1.55 and the average family size was 2.13.

0.1% of the population were under the age of 18, 0.7% from 18 to 24, 3.6% from 25 to 44, 22.7% from 45 to 64, and 72.8% who were 65 years of age or older. The median age was 73.5 years. For every 100 females, the population had 67.2 males. For every 100 females ages 18 and older there were 67.2 males.

=== 2000 census ===
As of the 2000 United States census there were 13,884 people, 8,575 households, and 4,433 families living in the CDP. The population density was 930.7 people/km^{2} (2,411 people/mi^{2}). There were 9,015 housing units at an average density of 604.3 units/km^{2} (1,565 units/mi^{2}). The racial makeup of the CDP was 98.97% White, 0.38% African American, 0.01% Native American, 0.22% Asian, 0.01% Pacific Islander, 0.05% from other races, and 0.35% from two or more races. Hispanic or Latino of any race were 1.09% of the population.

There were 8,575 households, out of which 0.1% had children under the age of 18 living with them, 46.1% were married couples living together, 4.7% had a female householder with no husband present, and 48.3% were non-families. 46.3% of all households were made up of individuals, and 42.4% had someone living alone who was 65 years of age or older. The average household size was 1.58 and the average family size was 2.08.

In the CDP the population was spread out, with 0.1% under the age of 18, 0.4% from 18 to 24, 2.1% from 25 to 44, 13.6% from 45 to 64, and 83.8% who were 65 years of age or older. The median age was 76 years. For every 100 females, there were 65.9 males. For every 100 females age 18 and over, there were 65.8 males.

The median income for a household in the CDP was $26,900, and the median income for a family was $33,575. Males had a median income of $35,197 versus $26,149 for females. The per capita income for the CDP was $22,755. About 2.9% of families and 6.0% of the population were below the poverty line, including none of those under age 18 and 5.7% of those age 65 or over.
