= Silver Ridge, New Jersey =

Populated place in Ocean County, New Jersey, US

- Census-designated place
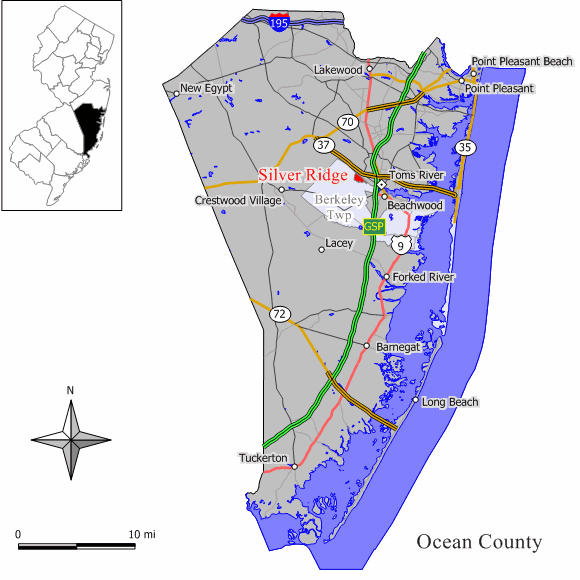
- Map of Silver Ridge highlighted within Ocean County. Inset: Location of Ocean County in New Jersey.

- Location in Ocean County Location in New Jersey Location in the United States
- Coordinates: 39.961716°N 74.235938°W
- Country: United States
- State: New Jersey
- County: Ocean
- Township: Berkeley

Area
  - Total: 0.47 sq mi (1.22 km^{2})
  - Land: 0.47 sq mi (1.21 km^{2})
  - Water: 0.0039 sq mi (0.01 km^{2}) 0.83%
- Elevation: 20 ft (6 m)

Population (2020)
  - Total: 1,167
  - Density: 2,507.7/sq mi (968.23/km^{2})
- Time zone: UTC−05:00 (Eastern (EST))
  - Summer (DST): UTC−04:00 (Eastern (EDT))
- Area code: 609
- FIPS code: 34-67665
- GNIS feature ID: 02390300

Silver Ridge is an unincorporated community and census-designated place (CDP) located within Berkeley Township, in Ocean County, in the U.S. state of New Jersey. As of the 2020 census, Silver Ridge had a population of 1,167.

== Geography ==
According to the United States Census Bureau, the CDP had a total area of 0.469 square miles (1.21 km^{2}), including 0.465 square miles (1.20 km^{2}) of land and 0.004 square miles (0.010 km^{2}) of water (0.83%).

== Demographics ==
Historical population
Census	Pop.	Note	%±
1990	1,138		—
2000	1,211		6.4%
2010	1,133		−6.4%
2020	1,167		3.0%
Sources: 1950 1960 1970; 1980 1990 2000; 2010

Silver Ridge first appeared as a census designated place in the 1990 U.S. census.

=== 2020 census ===
Silver Ridge CDP, New Jersey – Racial and ethnic composition Note: the US Census treats Hispanic/Latino as an ethnic category. This table excludes Latinos from the racial categories and assigns them to a separate category. Hispanics/Latinos may be of any race.
Race / Ethnicity (NH = Non-Hispanic)	Pop 2000	Pop 2010	Pop 2020	% 2000	% 2010	% 2020
White alone (NH)	1,188	1,069	1,061	98.10%	94.35%	90.92%
Black or African American alone (NH)	4	16	19	0.33%	1.41%	1.63%
Native American or Alaska Native alone (NH)	1	1	3	0.08%	0.09%	0.26%
Asian alone (NH)	3	4	13	0.25%	0.35%	1.11%
Native Hawaiian or Pacific Islander alone (NH)	0	0	0	0.00%	0.00%	0.00%
Other race alone (NH)	0	0	2	0.00%	0.00%	0.17%
Mixed race or Multiracial (NH)	0	5	13	0.00%	0.44%	1.11%
Hispanic or Latino (any race)	15	38	56	1.24%	3.35%	4.80%
Total	1,211	1,133	1,167	100.00%	100.00%	100.00%

=== 2010 census ===
The 2010 United States census counted 1,133 people, 749 households, and 309 families in the CDP. The population density was 2,434.6 people per square mile (940.0 people/km^{2}). There were 827 housing units at an average density of 1,777.1 units per square mile (686.1 units/km^{2}). The racial makeup was 96.91% (1,098) White, 1.41% (16) Black or African American, 0.09% (1) Native American, 0.35% (4) Asian, 0.00% (0) Pacific Islander, 0.62% (7) from other races, and 0.62% (7) from two or more races. Hispanic or Latino of any race were 3.35% (38) of the population.

Of the 749 households, 0.3% had children under the age of 18; 32.0% were married couples living together; 7.2% had a female householder with no husband present and 58.7% were non-families. Of all households, 54.9% were made up of individuals and 43.1% had someone living alone who was 65 years of age or older. The average household size was 1.51 and the average family size was 2.13.

0.4% of the population were under the age of 18, 1.1% from 18 to 24, 4.0% from 25 to 44, 25.1% from 45 to 64, and 69.5% who were 65 years of age or older. The median age was 71.2 years. For every 100 females, the population had 63.5 males. For every 100 females ages 18 and older there were 63.7 males.

=== 2000 census ===
As of the 2000 United States census there were 1,211 people, 770 households, and 372 families living in the CDP. The population density was 1,062.7 people/km^{2} (2,752 people/mi^{2}). There were 827 housing units at an average density of 725.7 units/km^{2} (1,880 units/mi^{2}). The racial makeup of the CDP was 99.26% White, 0.33% African American, 0.08% Native American, 0.25% Asian, 0.08% from other races. Hispanic or Latino of any race were 1.24% of the population.

There were 770 households, out of which none had children under the age of 18 living with them, 41.8% were married couples living together, 5.5% had a female householder with no husband present, and 51.6% were non-families. 48.6% of all households were made up of individuals, and 41.4% had someone living alone who was 65 years of age or older. The average household size was 1.57 and the average family size was 2.11.

In the CDP the population was spread out, with 0.1% under the age of 18, 0.5% from 18 to 24, 3.4% from 25 to 44, 22.6% from 45 to 64, and 73.4% who were 65 years of age or older. The median age was 72 years. For every 100 females, there were 68.7 males. For every 100 females age 18 and over, there were 68.5 males.

The median income for a household in the CDP was $29,671, and the median income for a family was $37,281. Males had a median income of $42,708 versus $19,911 for females. The per capita income for the CDP was $22,403. None of the families and 3.9% of the population were living below the poverty line, including no under eighteens and 5.5% of those over 64.
