= Holiday City South, New Jersey =

Populated place in Ocean County, New Jersey, US

- Census-designated place
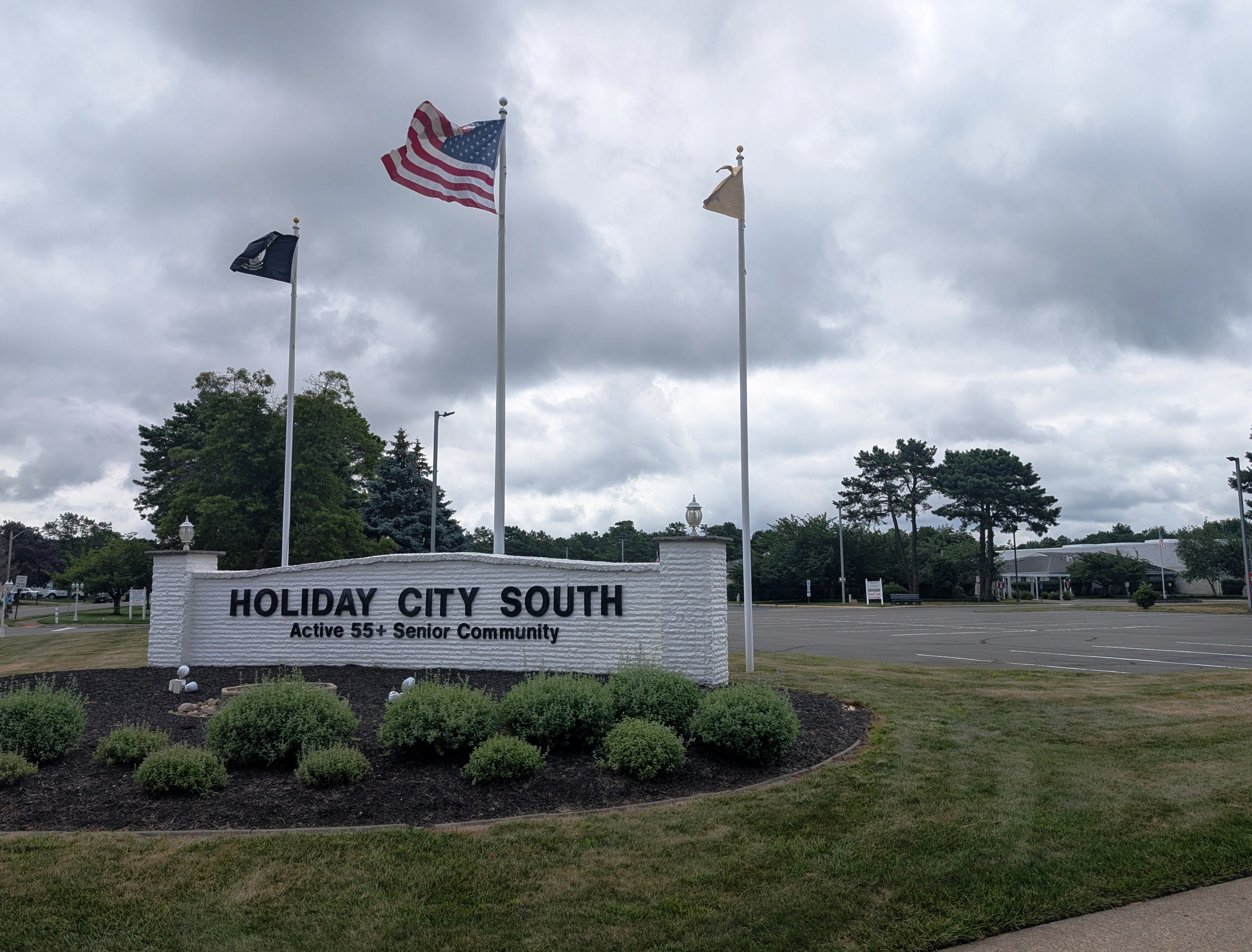
- Welcome sign and clubhouse

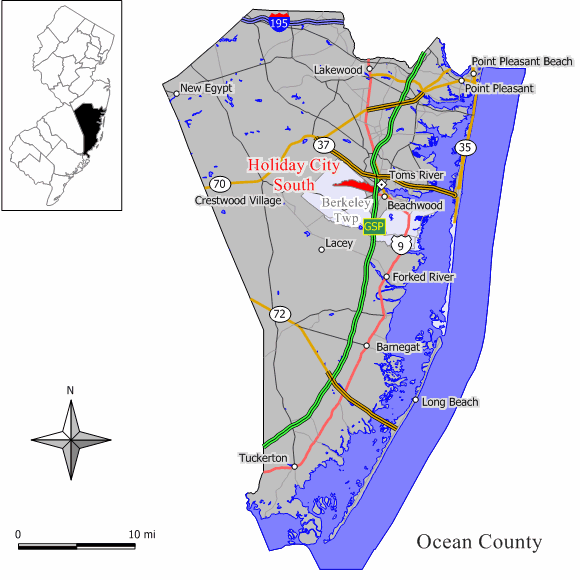
- Map of Holiday City South CDP in Ocean County. Inset: Location of Ocean County in New Jersey.

- Location in Ocean County Location in New Jersey Location in the United States
- Coordinates: 39.954094°N 74.237294°W
- Country: United States
- State: New Jersey
- County: Ocean
- Township: Berkeley

Area
  - Total: 1.90 sq mi (4.92 km^{2})
  - Land: 1.88 sq mi (4.87 km^{2})
  - Water: 0.023 sq mi (0.06 km^{2}) 1.10%
- Elevation: 33 ft (10 m)

Population (2020)
  - Total: 4,124
  - Density: 2,195.4/sq mi (847.63/km^{2})
- Time zone: UTC−05:00 (Eastern (EST))
  - Summer (DST): UTC−04:00 (Eastern (EDT))
- Area code: 609
- FIPS code: 34-32418
- GNIS feature ID: 02389941

Holiday City South is an unincorporated community and census-designated place (CDP) located within Berkeley Township, in Ocean County, in the U.S. state of New Jersey. As of the 2020 census, Holiday City South had a population of 4,124.

== Geography ==
According to the United States Census Bureau, the CDP had a total area of 1.983 square miles (5.14 km^{2}), including 1.961 square miles (5.08 km^{2}) of land and 0.022 square miles (0.057 km^{2}) of water (1.10%).

== Demographics ==
Historical population
Census	Pop.	Note	%±
1990	5,452		—
2000	4,047		−25.8%
2010	3,689		−8.8%
2020	4,124		11.8%
Sources: 1950 1960 1970; 1980 1990 2000; 2010 2020

Holiday City South first appeared as a census designated place in the 1990 U.S. census.

=== Racial and ethnic composition ===
Holiday City South CDP, New Jersey – Racial and ethnic composition Note: the US Census treats Hispanic/Latino as an ethnic category. This table excludes Latinos from the racial categories and assigns them to a separate category. Hispanics/Latinos may be of any race.
Race / Ethnicity (NH = Non-Hispanic)	Pop 2000	Pop 2010	Pop 2020	% 2000	% 2010	% 2020
White alone (NH)	3,780	3,324	3,266	93.40%	90.11%	79.19%
Black or African American alone (NH)	206	205	362	5.09%	5.56%	8.78%
Native American or Alaska Native alone (NH)	2	3	5	0.05%	0.08%	0.12%
Asian alone (NH)	6	26	24	0.15%	0.70%	0.58%
Native Hawaiian or Pacific Islander alone (NH)	0	3	3	0.00%	0.08%	0.07%
Other race alone (NH)	0	3	18	0.00%	0.08%	0.44%
Mixed race or Multiracial (NH)	14	29	83	0.35%	0.79%	2.01%
Hispanic or Latino (any race)	39	96	363	0.96%	2.60%	8.80%
Total	4,047	3,689	4,124	100.00%	100.00%	100.00%

=== 2020 census ===
As of the 2020 census, Holiday City South had a population of 4,124. The median age was 68.2 years. 5.8% of residents were under the age of 18 and 58.4% were age 65 or older. For every 100 females, there were 72.8 males, and for every 100 females age 18 and older, there were 71.6 males.

All residents lived in urban areas, while 0.0% lived in rural areas.

There were 2,326 households, of which 5.9% had children under the age of 18 living in them. Of all households, 36.0% were married-couple households, 15.1% were households with a male householder and no spouse or partner present, and 43.8% were households with a female householder and no spouse or partner present. 43.7% of all households were made up of individuals, and 35.0% had someone living alone who was 65 years of age or older.

There were 2,567 housing units, of which 9.4% were vacant. The homeowner vacancy rate was 2.8%, and the rental vacancy rate was 2.4%.

=== 2010 census ===
The 2010 United States census counted 3,689 people, 2,257 households, and 1,104 families in the CDP. The population density was 1,881.1 people per square mile (726.3 people/km^{2}). There were 2,460 housing units at an average density of 1,254.4 units per square mile (484.3 units/km^{2}). The racial makeup was 92.19% (3,401) White, 5.58% (206) Black or African American, 0.11% (4) Native American, 0.70% (26) Asian, 0.08% (3) Pacific Islander, 0.43% (16) from other races, and 0.89% (33) from two or more races. Hispanic or Latino of any race were 2.60% (96) of the population.

Of the 2,257 households, 1.6% had children under the age of 18; 38.7% were married couples living together; 8.2% had a female householder with no husband present and 51.1% were non-families. Of all households, 48.6% were made up of individuals and 43.0% had someone living alone who was 65 years of age or older. The average household size was 1.63 and the average family size was 2.22.

2.7% of the population were under the age of 18, 1.7% from 18 to 24, 4.9% from 25 to 44, 17.3% from 45 to 64, and 73.4% who were 65 years of age or older. The median age was 75.6 years. For every 100 females, the population had 70.2 males. For every 100 females ages 18 and older there were 68.9 males.

=== 2000 census ===
As of the 2000 United States census there were 4,047 people, 2,385 households, and 1,411 families living in the CDP. The population density was 831.1 people/km^{2} (2,153 people/mi^{2}). There were 2,470 housing units at an average density of 507.3 units/km^{2} (1,314 units/mi^{2}). The racial makeup of the CDP was 94.27% White, 5.09% African American, 0.05% Native American, 0.15% Asian, 0.02% from other races, and 0.42% from two or more races. Hispanic or Latino of any race were 0.96% of the population.

There were 2,385 households, out of which 0.9% had children under the age of 18 living with them, 53.2% were married couples living together, 4.7% had a female householder with no husband present, and 40.8% were non-families. 38.6% of all households were made up of individuals, and 35.8% had someone living alone who was 65 years of age or older. The average household size was 1.70 and the average family size was 2.12.

In the CDP the population was spread out, with 1.6% under the age of 18, 0.8% from 18 to 24, 3.3% from 25 to 44, 10.3% from 45 to 64, and 84.0% who were 65 years of age or older. The median age was 74 years. For every 100 females, there were 73.0 males. For every 100 females age 18 and over, there were 72.6 males.

The median income for a household in the CDP was $25,733, and the median income for a family was $30,893. Males had a median income of $34,375 versus $26,250 for females. The per capita income for the CDP was $18,726. About 5.6% of families and 6.5% of the population were below the poverty line, including 29.8% of those under age 18 and 6.3% of those age 65 or over.
