= Holiday Heights, New Jersey =

Populated place in Ocean County, New Jersey, US

- Census-designated place
- Map of Holiday Heights CDP in Ocean County. Inset: Location of Ocean County in New Jersey.

- Location in Ocean County Location in New Jersey Location in the United States
- Coordinates: 39.939383°N 74.257272°W
- Country: United States
- State: New Jersey
- County: Ocean
- Township: Berkeley

Area
  - Total: 5.03 sq mi (13.02 km^{2})
  - Land: 5.03 sq mi (13.02 km^{2})
  - Water: 0 sq mi (0.00 km^{2}) 0.00%
- Elevation: 66 ft (20 m)

Population (2020)
  - Total: 2,135
  - Density: 424.8/sq mi (164.01/km^{2})
- Time zone: UTC−05:00 (Eastern (EST))
  - Summer (DST): UTC−04:00 (Eastern (EDT))
- Area code: 609
- FIPS code: 34-32424
- GNIS feature ID: 02389943

Holiday Heights is an unincorporated community and census-designated place (CDP) located within Berkeley Township, in Ocean County, in the U.S. state of New Jersey. As of the 2020 census, Holiday Heights had a population of 2,135.

== Geography ==
According to the United States Census Bureau, the CDP had a total area of 4.944 square miles (12.80 km^{2}), all of which was land.

== Demographics ==
Historical population
Census	Pop.	Note	%±
1990	703		—
2000	2,389		239.8%
2010	2,099		−12.1%
2020	2,135		1.7%
Sources: 1950 1960 1970; 1980 1990 2000; 2010 2020

Holiday Heights first appeared as a census designated place in the 1990 U.S. census.

=== Racial and ethnic composition ===
Holiday Heights CDP, New Jersey – Racial and ethnic composition Note: the US Census treats Hispanic/Latino as an ethnic category. This table excludes Latinos from the racial categories and assigns them to a separate category. Hispanics/Latinos may be of any race.
Race / Ethnicity (NH = Non-Hispanic)	Pop 2000	Pop 2010	Pop 2020	% 2000	% 2010	% 2020
White alone (NH)	2,338	2,028	2,013	97.87%	96.62%	94.29%
Black or African American alone (NH)	11	16	16	0.46%	0.76%	0.75%
Native American or Alaska Native alone (NH)	0	1	0	0.00%	0.05%	0.00%
Asian alone (NH)	6	12	19	0.25%	0.57%	0.89%
Native Hawaiian or Pacific Islander alone (NH)	0	0	0	0.00%	0.00%	0.00%
Other race alone (NH)	0	0	3	0.00%	0.00%	0.14%
Mixed race or Multiracial (NH)	3	3	17	0.13%	0.14%	0.80%
Hispanic or Latino (any race)	31	39	67	1.30%	1.86%	3.14%
Total	2,389	2,099	2,135	100.00%	100.00%	100.00%

=== 2020 census ===
As of the 2020 census, Holiday Heights had a population of 2,135. The median age was 73.0 years. 0.3% of residents were under the age of 18 and 76.6% of residents were 65 years of age or older. For every 100 females there were 74.0 males, and for every 100 females age 18 and over there were 73.9 males age 18 and over.

99.8% of residents lived in urban areas, while 0.2% lived in rural areas.

There were 1,306 households in Holiday Heights, of which 1.5% had children under the age of 18 living in them. Of all households, 43.0% were married-couple households, 14.2% were households with a male householder and no spouse or partner present, and 39.6% were households with a female householder and no spouse or partner present. About 43.8% of all households were made up of individuals and 38.7% had someone living alone who was 65 years of age or older.

There were 1,417 housing units, of which 7.8% were vacant. The homeowner vacancy rate was 1.9% and the rental vacancy rate was 3.9%.

=== 2010 census ===
The 2010 United States census counted 2,099 people, 1,311 households, and 690 families in the CDP. The population density was 424.6 people per square mile (163.9 people/km^{2}). There were 1,417 housing units at an average density of 286.6 units per square mile (110.7 units/km^{2}). The racial makeup was 98.28% (2,063) White, 0.81% (17) Black or African American, 0.05% (1) Native American, 0.57% (12) Asian, 0.00% (0) Pacific Islander, 0.10% (2) from other races, and 0.19% (4) from two or more races. Hispanic or Latino of any race were 1.86% (39) of the population.

Of the 1,311 households, 0.5% had children under the age of 18; 48.1% were married couples living together; 3.8% had a female householder with no husband present and 47.4% were non-families. Of all households, 44.5% were made up of individuals and 40.8% had someone living alone who was 65 years of age or older. The average household size was 1.60 and the average family size was 2.08.

0.7% of the population were under the age of 18, 0.3% from 18 to 24, 2.1% from 25 to 44, 11.7% from 45 to 64, and 85.1% who were 65 years of age or older. The median age was 77.8 years. For every 100 females, the population had 70.9 males. For every 100 females ages 18 and older there were 70.7 males.

=== 2000 census ===
As of the 2000 United States census there were 2,389 people, 1,369 households, and 941 families living in the CDP. The population density was 184.5 people/km^{2} (478 people/mi^{2}). There were 1,393 housing units at an average density of 107.6 units/km^{2} (279 units/mi^{2}). The racial makeup of the CDP was 99.16% White, 0.46% African American, 0.25% Asian, and 0.13% from two or more races. Hispanic or Latino of any race were 1.30% of the population.

There were 1,369 households, out of which 0.2% had children under the age of 18 living with them, 64.7% were married couples living together, 3.4% had a female householder with no husband present, and 31.2% were non-families. 29.8% of all households were made up of individuals, and 27.9% had someone living alone who was 65 years of age or older. The average household size was 1.75 and the average family size was 2.06.

In the CDP the population was spread out, with 0.3% under the age of 18, 0.1% from 18 to 24, 2.0% from 25 to 44, 10.8% from 45 to 64, and 86.8% who were 65 years of age or older. The median age was 73 years. For every 100 females, there were 78.6 males. For every 100 females age 18 and over, there were 78.3 males.

The median income for a household in the CDP was $30,025, and the median income for a family was $33,360. Males had a median income of $45,573 versus $25,313 for females. The per capita income for the CDP was $19,062. About 2.3% of families and 2.0% of the population were below the poverty line, including none of those under age 18 and 2.3% of those age 65 or over.
