= Barnegat =

Barnegat can refer to:

== Places ==
=== Canada ===
- Barnegat, Alberta, a locality in Canada

=== United States ===
- Barnegat (CDP), New Jersey, a census-designated place within Barnegat Township, New Jersey
- Barnegat Bay in Ocean County, New Jersey, United States
- Barnegat Inlet in Ocean County, New Jersey
- Barnegat Lighthouse State Park, a park on Long Beach Island in Ocean County, New Jersey
- Barnegat Peninsula, a barrier peninsula in Ocean County, New Jersey
- Barnegat Township, New Jersey, a township in Ocean County, New Jersey,

== Schools ==
- Barnegat High School, a public high school in Barnegat Township, New Jersey
- Barnegat Township School District, a public K-12 school district in Barnegat, Township, New Jersey

== Ships ==
- USS Barnegat (AVP-10), a United States Navy seaplane tender in commission from 1941 to 1946
- Barnegat-class seaplane tender, commissioned into the United States Navy between 1941 and 1946
- United States lightship Barnegat (LV-79), built in 1904

== See also ==
- Barnegat Light (disambiguation)
