= Ocean County Vocational Technical School =

School district in Ocean County, New Jersey, US

Address
- 137 Bey Lea Road Toms River, Ocean County, New Jersey, 08753; United States
- Coordinates: 39.985338°N 74.194115°W

District information
- Grades: Vocational
- Superintendent: Karen L. Homiek
- Business administrator: Stephen J. Brennan
- Schools: 7

Students and staff
- Enrollment: 664 (as of 2021–22)
- Faculty: 128.9 FTEs
- Student–teacher ratio: 5.1:1

Other information
- District Factor Group: none
- Website: www.ocvts.org
Ind.	Per pupil	District spending	Rank (*)	Vocational average	%± vs. average
1A	Total Spending	$15,904	4	$18,891	−15.8%
1	Budgetary Cost	12,408	3	17,296	−28.3%
2	Classroom Instruction	7,420	6	9,045	−18.0%
6	Support Services	1,342	3	2,269	−40.9%
8	Administrative Cost	2,398	11	2,353	1.9%
10	Operations & Maintenance	1,614	2	3,014	−46.4%
13	Extracurricular Activities	122	3	464	−73.7%
16	Median Teacher Salary	60,731	11	65,035
Data from NJDoE 2014 Taxpayers' Guide to Education Spending. *Of Vocational districts with any number of students. Lowest spending=1; Highest=21

The Ocean County Vocational Technical School is a public school district based in Toms River that provides technical and vocational education to residents of Ocean County, in the U.S. state of New Jersey. The district provides a number of full-time public high school programs and also serves adult students. The district operates under the supervision of the Ocean County Board of County Commissioners and an appointed board of education.

As of the 2021–22 school year, the district, comprised of seven schools, had an enrollment of 664 students and 128.9 classroom teachers (on an FTE basis), for a student–teacher ratio of 5.1:1.

== History ==
The district was established in 1959 with the creation of a Licensed Practical Nurse training program. Trade and technical programs for high school students was initiated in 1963. Initially, all programs were based in Toms River. Centers were opened in Brick Township, Jackson Township and the Waretown section of Ocean Township in 1972.

In 1994, the Career & Technical Institute (CTI) was opened in Hangar No. 1 at the Lakehurst Naval Air Station, offering adult programs in aviation and electronics, as well as a full-time academy program for high school students, the district's first. The Marine Academy of Technology and Environmental Science (MATES) was created in 1997. In 1998, the Culinary Arts Academy was established and the Academy of the Arts and Graphic Design Technology opened in 1999.

== Awards and recognition ==
The Performing Arts Academy was one of 11 in the state to be recognized in 2014 by the United States Department of Education's National Blue Ribbon Schools Program.

== Academic programs ==
Full-time academic programs available through the district (with 2021–22 enrollment data from the National Center for Education Statistics) are:

Career academies

- Marine Academy of Technology and Environmental Science (MATES) (274 students; grades 9-12)
- OCVTS Performing Arts Academy - Theater and Dance (284; 9-12)
- Academy of Law and Public Safety - Criminal Justice and Homeland Security (75; 9-12)

Other programs

- Ocean County Vocational Technical School Brick Center (3; 9-12)
- Ocean County Vocational Technical School Waretown Center (NA; Ungraded)
- Ocean County Vocational Technical School Jackson Center (3; 9-12)
- Ocean County Vocational Technical School Toms River Center (9; 9-12)

== Administration ==
Core members of the district's administration are:

- Karen L. Homiek, superintendent
- Stephen J. Brennan, business administrator and board secretary

== Board of education ==
The district's board of education, comprised of five members, sets policy and oversees the fiscal and educational operation of the district through its administration. The members are appointed by the Ocean County Board of County Commissioners to serve four-year terms on a staggered basis, with either one or two terms up for reappointment each year. The board appoints a superintendent to oversee the district's day-to-day operations and a business administrator to supervise the business functions of the district.
