= Kenneth G. Miller =

American geologist (born 1956)

Kenneth Miller
- Born: 1956 (age 69–70)
- Education: Rutgers University, MIT/Woods Hole Oceanographic Institute
- Scientific career
- Fields: Geology
- Workplaces: Rutgers University
- Doctoral advisor: W.A. Berggren, B.E. Tucholke

Kenneth G. Miller (born 1956) is an American geologist who is currently a distinguished professor at Rutgers University.

== Early life and education ==
Born in 1956, Miller grew up in Medford, New Jersey. In 1978, he received an A.B. from Rutgers College, and in 1982, received a PhD from the Massachusetts Institute of Technology/Woods Hole Oceanographic Institution Joint Program in Oceanography.

== Career ==
He went on to work as an Associate Research Scientist at Lamont-Doherty Geological Observatory from 1983 to 1988 and has taught at Rutgers University since 1987. Miller is a veteran of 8 scientific cruises. He has integrated offshore seismic and drilling activities with onshore drilling: since 1993, he has been Chief Scientist of the New Jersey Coastal Plain Drilling Project which continuously cored thirteen sites. He has written more than 100 scientific papers, his most significant publications include widely cited synthesis of Cenozoic oxygen isotopes (Miller et al., 1987) and a synthesis of global sea-level change (Miller et al., 1998, 2005). He was awarded the Rosenstiel Award from the University of Miami in 2003, a two-time JOI/USSAC Distinguished Lecturer (1995, 2006), and a fellow of the American Geophysical Union.

He been featured in articles and given talks about sea level change and the effects of global warming. He also teaches a course on sea level change.

Miller splits his time between homes in New Jersey in Pennington and in the Waretown section of Ocean Township above Barnegat Bay, where he describes how he "watches the inexorable rise in sea level".
