= Brigid Harrington =

American actress, singer, dancer and voice artist

Brigid Harrington (born 2000) is an American actress, singer, dancer and voice artist. She is best known as the first voice of Koko on the American version of the British animated TV series Chuggington, and on Broadway as Jane Banks in Mary Poppins.

== Biography ==
Harrington has, at a young age, played a lead character in two major Disney properties on television and Broadway. Since 18 January 2010, her voice has been heard daily on the Disney Channel's animated preschool series Chuggington as Koko, and is also used in Chuggington Interactive Toys, on DVD , in Apps and online.

On Broadway, Harrington played Jane Banks in Mary Poppins at the New Amsterdam Theatre. Other widely seen work includes voice overs for Nickelodeon & the Nick Jr. Channel. Her speaking and singing voice has been used to introduce various Nick Jr. shows and in educational segments. Commercially, she is featured in many radio spots. While on camera, she has been seen nationally and internationally. She has also been featured in theatrical productions regionally including performing at the Walnut Street Theatre in Philadelphia Pa.

Raised in Barnegat Township, New Jersey, Harrington attended the University of Notre Dame, double-majoring in Film/Television/Theatre and Political Science. She graduated from The University of Virginia School of Law with her J.D. in 2025.

For high school, Brigid attended OCVTS Performing Arts Academy. Harrington transferred to Barnegat High School for her sophomore year, where she appeared in the school's production of The Addams Family.

== Career ==
=== Disney Channel ===
Harrington originated the American voice of the lead female character Koko in the animated series Chuggington, when it debuted in America on the Disney Channel on 18 January 2010. Harrington records for the American version, and also joined other cast members in singing the US show's theme song. She is also featured in a series of "Be Safe" PSAs running on the Disney Channel in conjunction with the National Highway Traffic Safety Administration .

In 2017, the Disney Channel launched "Chuggington Little Trainees", an updated version of Chuggington (in which Harrington continues to voice lead female character Koko), and a new line of toys for the next generation of viewers.

=== Nickelodeon ===
For Nickelodeon and Nick Jr., Harrington has recorded bumpers and musical intros for many of their shows such as The Backyardigans, Go, Diego, Go!, Ni Hao, Kai-Lan, and the Fresh Beat Band. She also recorded special BrainBooster segments and educational features for "Ni-Hao, Kai-lan".

=== Television ===
Harrington played "April" opposite Jerry Springer and Greg Mullavey in the reading for Peter Welch's TV sitcom in development, The House Arrest Rooney's in New York City in 2016. In 2014, Harrington played "Kelly" in the premiere episode, "A Killer Routine", of Discovery ID Channel's Momsters: When Moms Go Bad, hosted by Roseanne Barr. In 2010, she appeared in the A&E International show "Bloodwork". Also that year, ahw sang a song in Italian and played Lidia Bastianich's granddaughter "Julia" in Nonna Tell Me a Story: Lidia's Christmas Kitchen which ran on PBS and CreateTV, and is now available on DVD. In 2011, Harrington was interviewed on ABC's Good Morning America, and was also featured in some performance shots while she sang and danced as Jane Banks in Mary Poppins on Broadway.

=== America's Got Talent ===
Brigid Harrington and her sister Shannon Harrington were taped at the Hammerstein Ballroom in New York City for America's Got Talent (season 5). A portion of their act and interview were featured in a "Great Talent" promo for the show which aired on NBC, and the Oxygen Network.

=== Commercials ===
Among Harrington's credits are commercials for IKEA (in which she was cast with sister Shannon Harrington), Hasbro, CarMax, Comcast and Time Warner Cable. She also appears in an anti-smoking public service announcement by NJ Quitline.

=== Theatre ===
Harrington began her career on the stage, and within a couple of years made her Broadway debut at the New Amsterdam Theatre on May 10, 2011, starring as Jane Banks in Disney's Mary Poppins. She played opposite 3 "Mary's": Ashley Brown, Laura Michelle Kelly, and Steffanie Leigh. Also in 2011, she participated in the annual Broadway Cares/Equity Fights Aids Gypsy of the Year Competition. Along with Mary Poppins' castmates, Harrington won First Runner-Up for Best Stage Presentation, and according to David Noh of Chelsea Now, "Performance-wise, little Brigid Harrington, who plays one of the children in 'Mary Poppins', got the biggest applause. In that show's contribution to the competition, kids played adult roles, and Harrington, wearing a gray-streaked wig and pearls, hilariously impersonated Martha in 'Who's Afraid of Virginia Woolf.' " Harrington and a castmate's performance was recognized by Playbill Contributing Writer Seth Rudetsky as one of his "Most unforgettable experiences of 2011". . In 2015, Harrington originated the role of "Charlotte" in the new musical, Once 'Round the Circle, written by Shanan Estreicher. The cast recorded a demo at the Avatar studios in NYC, and during the winter of 2016, performed a workshop production in New York City as part of Emerging Artist Theatre's New Work Series. Harrington has also performed in many professional and regional theatrical productions such as Ah, Wilderness! (Muriel) for the Equity professional East Lynne Theater Company in 2017, Scrooge The Musical (Tiny Tim), and Annie, (Annie). She played Susan Waverly at the historic Walnut Street Theatre's production of Irving Berlin's White Christmas. Her younger sister Shannon Harrington also played the same role on the Broadway National Tour of the same production.

=== Film ===
In 2016, Harrington played "Julie" in Benji The Dove, a feature film released in 2017, starring Lynn Cohen (Hunger Games), and directed by Kevin Arbouet. Also in 2016, Harrington participated in the screenplay reading of Hedges, a coming-of-age story written by Charlie Zicari, in which Harrington plays the love interest to the main character, read by Evan Roe. In 2014, Harrington shot a scene in her first feature film — Lullaby — playing "Sarah" in a scene that includes, among others, Garrett Hedlund and Jennifer Hudson. The film is the first by Andrew Levitas, who is the film's Director and Writer. Starting in October 2012, Kidtoon Films released Chuggington Traintastic Adventures to theaters nationwide as a way to introduce children to their first cinematic experience.

=== Voice-over and recordings ===
In addition to her voice-over work on the Disney Channel, Disney Jr., and Nickelodeon, Harrington has provided the voice of Koko in Chuggington Interactive toys, games and apps. She can be heard on 3 The Magic School Bus audio books from Scholastic as Wanda & Molly. She has recorded many radio commercials including ads for Twizzlers, Capital One Bank, and several for Comcast. Harrington also recorded an original song with Mary Poppins' cast on Carols for a Cure 2011: Vol. 13, the annual holiday CD featuring Broadway performers, with proceeds going towards Broadway Cares/Equity Fights Aids.

=== Live performances ===
- Hammerstein Ballroom - performed with sister Shannon Harrington for America's Got Talent Season 5, (recorded for broadcast) April 22, 2012
- Student and Youth Travel Association Conference, NYC - performed with company of Mary Poppins, August 22, 2011
- Broadway Sessions, NYC - performed at reunion of Broadway's revival cast of Hair, April 25, 2013
- Broadway for the Arts Concert of Stars,- Skyline Theatre Company, 2013 - 2017
- NJSDD Songwriting Competition - NJPAC, Newark NJ, 2015
- Michael Mitnick Concert - Joe's Pub, NYC 2013

== Community Outreach ==
In 2017, Brigid and her sister Shannon formed the arts education program, Broadway ArtsReach to spread appreciation of the arts while creating substantive change in arts education. The Broadway ArtsReach mission is to provide arts education to diverse communities and advocate for its necessity through educational performances, fundraising, the We Want Arts! advocacy podcast, and arts policy recommendations.

After Brigid performed with Todd Rundgren in 2018, Broadway ArtsReach formed a partnership with Rundgren's Spirit of Harmony Foundation (SOHF), donating a portion of Broadway ArtsReach's proceeds to help this philanthropic organization support music and music education in public schools.

== Recognition ==
- 1st Runner Up, Best Stage Presentation: 23rd Annual BC/EFA "Gypsy of the Year" Competition
- Recognized as "Unforgettable experiences of 2011" in Playbill.com
- National Finalist: Shrek The Musical "Not Your Ordinary Princess" Broadway competition.
- Cynopisis Media Kids Imagination Award: Chuggington Traintastic Adventures app.
- Annie Award Nomination: Chuggington, 2012. and 2013.
- Online Voting People's Choice Finalist in New Jersey Shout Down Drugs (NJSDD) songwriting competition
