= Ocean Township =

Ocean Township may refer to the following places in the United States:

- Ocean Township, Ocean County, New Jersey
- Ocean Township, Monmouth County, New Jersey
