= OCVTS Performing Arts Academy =

High school in Ocean County, New Jersey, US

Grunin Performing Arts Academy

Location
- 1 College Drive; Toms River, Ocean County, New Jersey 08754; United States
- 40.0095°N 74.1653°W

Information
- Type: Magnet public high school
- Established: September 2001
- School district: Ocean County Vocational Technical School
- NCES School ID: 341198006122
- Principal: Christine Santasieri
- Faculty: 28.5 FTEs
- Grades: 9-12
- Enrollment: 268 (as of 2023–24)
- Student to teacher ratio: 9.4:1
- Accreditation: Middle States Association of Colleges and Schools
- Website: www.ocvts.org/gpaa/paa-academy.html

Ocean County Vocational Technical School Grunin Performing Arts Academy (or PAA for short) is a specialized, public high school program which concentrates heavily on the fields of performing arts such as dance, vocal music, and theater, serving students in ninth through twelfth grades from all of Ocean County, in the U.S. state of New Jersey. Located in Toms River on the campus of Ocean County College, it is the sister high school of the Marine Academy of Technology and Environmental Sciences, another full-time program that is also part of the Ocean County Vocational Technical School district. Because the school is a full-time program, students take both their performance major and academic courses at the school. The school is accredited by the Middle States Association of Colleges and Schools Commission on Elementary and Secondary Schools through July 2027.

As of the 2023–24 school year, the school had an enrollment of 268 students and 28.5 classroom teachers (on an FTE basis), for a student–teacher ratio of 9.4:1. There were 18 students (6.7% of enrollment) eligible for free lunch and 6 (2.2% of students) eligible for reduced-cost lunch.

== History ==
In January 2020, the OCVTS Grunin Performing Arts Academy moved from its original facility in Lakehurst to a new building located on the Ocean County College campus. The 57,000-square-foot (5,300 m^{2}) facility was constructed at a cost of $27 million, with about $11 million covered by the State of New Jersey, $8 million by the County of Ocean and $8 million received from the Jay and Linda Grunin Foundation.

== Awards, recognition and rankings ==
Schooldigger.com ranked the school tied for 173rd out of 381 public high schools statewide in its 2011 rankings (a decrease of 139 positions from the 2010 ranking) which were based on the combined percentage of students classified as proficient or above proficient on the mathematics (78.5%) and language arts literacy (95.3%) components of the High School Proficiency Assessment (HSPA).

Students at the school have won numerous awards such as state-level and international level rankings at the New Jersey Thespian Festival and International Thespian Society Festival. The school, staff, and students also hold achievements at the Montclair State University Theatre Night Awards and Paper Mill Playhouse Awards for their work in school productions.

== Curriculum ==
PAA relies heavily on block scheduling; each year is broken up into two semesters and each semester consists of four 80-minute, 5-credit classes. Every class offered is either an honors course or college-prep course because the high school is designed to test and challenge the brightest students both academically and in performance.

== Notable alumni ==
- Elijah Boothe, actor best known for his role in Luke Cage.
- Brigid Harrington, actress, singer, dancer and voice artist.
