= Waretown, New Jersey (former town) =

Coordinates: 39.7209°N 74.9442°W

Waretown was an unincorporated community of Gloucester Township in Gloucester County, New Jersey that existed between c. 1794–1874. Historically, it was located about 3.3 miles (5.3 km) northeast of the center of Williamstown and about 0.8 miles (1.3 km) from the current site of Sicklerville. The community is unrelated to the Waretown that exists today in Ocean County, New Jersey.

== Origin ==
Waretown was located at and around the crossroads of Williamstown and New Brooklyn Erial Roads, known today as "Mongan's Corner". Not much remains there today except Mongan's service station.

Although Waretown was originally created in Gloucester Township and County, it became part of Camden County in 1844 when Camden was created from Gloucester. Then in 1845, the township was changed from Gloucester to Winslow when Winslow was carved out of Gloucester.

Waretown was named for three Ware brothers who moved into and settled the area. They were John Jr., Jacob and George Ware. There was also a fourth brother, Joseph Ware, who also lived there with his family until his death in 1796. His son, Joseph O. Ware eventually took over his father's homestead and sold it to one of Jacob Ware's children. Their sister Patience Ware and her husband Paul H. Sears and family also moved there about 1794. All of the seven children of John Sr. and Sarah Marple Ware lived in Waretown during this time except for two of them who left New Jersey and migrated to Cincinnati, Ohio.

Beginning in 1794, the offspring of these families were all born in Waretown. Since they did not have their own cemetery, those who died in Waretown were usually buried in the Williamstown Old Methodist Church Cemetery, including John Ware, Jr., George Ware Sr., Patience Ware Sears and her husband Paul H. Sears, Rachel Ware Whitecar, Sarah Ware Ireland, and several others.

The 1794 date comes from the John Ware Sr. land deed to his son George Ware and son-in-law Paul Sears. John Ware Sr. obtained the land sometime after 1784 and appears to have had considerable influence in his children settling in the Waretown area.

The number of inhabitants of Waretown appear to have been quite numerous based on the number of children and grandchildren these four family members produced. However, shortly after 1810, many of the married and single children of John Ware Jr. began migrating westward. By 1830, eight of John Ware Jr.’s eleven children had migrated to one of four counties in the far southwest corner of Ohio which reduced the overall number of Waretown inhabitants. The children of George, Jacob and Patience continued living in Waretown although some of their family members also moved away.

The three sons and one sister who were the original settlers of Waretown also began to pass away during the first half of the 1800s. According to death records in Gloucester County, John Jr. died in 1810; John Sr. died in 1819; Amy, the first wife of George Ware Sr. died in 1805; George died in 1828; George's second wife, Naomi continued to live in Waretown until her death in 1868; Patience died in 1843 and her husband Paul followed her in 5 years; and Jacob and his wife died in 1861 and 1860 respectively.

Sometime between 1790 and 1810, John Sickler (son of Christopher Zeigler, born in Germany) moved his family from Chews Landing, Gloucester County, New Jersey and settled one mile southwest of Waretown, at the present crossroads of Williamstown and Sicklerville Roads. John's son William Tatem Sickler married Parnel Sears, daughter of Patience Ware Sears in Waretown in 1812 and their children were born and raised in Sicklertown.

Both Waretown and Sicklertown existed a mile apart and were referred to by their own names. Today, some have erroneously referred to them as the same town.

== Decline ==
As Waretown began to decrease in population during the first half of the 1800s, Sicklertown continued to grow. In 1851 the name Sicklertown was changed to Sicklerville. In 1874 a Post Office was opened in the store belonging to Paul Hammond Sickler (grandson of Patience Ware Sears) with him becoming its first Postmaster. Sometime after 1874 Waretown ceased to exist. Today, Sicklerville includes the areas once known as Sicklertown and Waretown.
