= Brookville, New Jersey =

Brookville, New Jersey may refer to:

- Brookville, Hunterdon County, New Jersey
- Brookville, Ocean County, New Jersey
