= Cottonmouth (Cornell Stokes) =

Marvel Comics supervillain

Publication information
- Publisher: Marvel Comics
- First appearance: Luke Cage, Power Man #18. (June 1974)
- Created by: Len Wein; George Tuska

In-story information
- Full name: Cornell Stokes
- Species: Human
- Place of origin: Earth
- Team affiliations: The Rivals; Flashmob; New Pride
- Notable aliases: Cottonmouth
- Abilities: Superhuman strength and durability

Cottonmouth (Cornell Stokes) is a supervillain appearing in American comic books published by Marvel Comics.

The character was portrayed by Mahershala Ali in the first season of the Marvel Cinematic Universe television series Luke Cage.

== Publication history ==
The character first appeared in Luke Cage, Power Man #18 (June 1974) in a story written by Len Wein and drawn by George Tuska. Cornell Cottonmouth, or just Cottonmouth, started out as a drug kingpin in New York City. He was involved in the events that led to Luke Cage gaining super powers and becoming "Power Man". Cottonmouth tried to recruit Cage to his organization, but was ultimately knocked out and turned over to police by Cage. During the "Shadowland" storyline, Cottonmouth returned as part of Nightshade's gang, Flashmob, where they come into conflict with Daredevil as well as a new Power Man, who, like his predecessor, knocked Cottonmouth out and turned him over to police.

== Fictional character biography ==
Cottonmouth is a drug lord who operates in New York. Willis Stryker, intending to frame Carl Lucas, steals a shipment of heroin from Cottonmouth's organization. After changing his name to Luke Cage, Lucas decides to track down the drugs that were used to frame him. Cage joins Cottonmouth's group to gather information and learn where his records are kept. Cottonmouth then tests Cage's loyalty by sending him to steal a shipment of heroin from rival crime boss Morgan. Cage succeeds and continues working with Cottonmouth until Cottonmouth learns of Cage's true intentions. Cage knocks Cottonmouth out, then calls the police to capture him.

During the 2010 "Shadowland" storyline, Cottonmouth appears as a member of Nightshade's gang called the Rivals. He is attacked by Hand ninjas sent by Daredevil, but Power Man repels the Hand ninjas and breaks Cottonmouth's teeth. Cottonmouth later obtains golden dentures.

Cottonmouth was at some point arrested and imprisoned in Ryker's Island, which he escapes from during a riot that occurs during "Civil War II". With all of his assets either seized by the FBI or appropriated by Tombstone, a desperate Cottonmouth reaches out to Piranha Jones for help, and is convinced by Jones to side with him and Black Cat in an upcoming war for control of Harlem. Unimpressed by the duo's plans, Cottonmouth abandons them in favor of joining Alex Wilder's New Pride.

== Powers and abilities ==
Cottonmouth has super-strength that rivals Luke Cage. He also has sharp teeth that he had sharpened to resemble fangs; combined with his jaw-strength they are capable of piercing Cage's "unbreakable" skin. Cottonmouth also has a good knowledge of different poisons.

== Other versions ==
Cottonmouth appears in the Marvel Comics 2 series The Amazing Spider-Girl. This version is the head of The Bronx branch of Black Tarantula's criminal empire.

== In other media ==
Mahershala Ali as Cornell "Cottonmouth" Stokes in the television series Luke Cage

Cornell Bertram "Cottonmouth" Stokes appears in Luke Cage, portrayed by Mahershala Ali as an adult and Elijah Boothe as a teenager. This version despises his nickname, which was derived from a childhood incident wherein several of his teeth were knocked out. Additionally, he is the grandson of Harlem crime lord Maybelline "Mama Mabel" Stokes, younger cousin and adopted brother of Mariah Dillard, and was part of a gang in his youth alongside barbershop owner Robert Hunter. In the present, Stokes publicly operates as the owner of the Harlem's Paradise nightclub while secretly working as a private arms dealer alongside Dillard and Shades. After internal affairs starts to investigate his actions, Rafael Scarfe attempts to blackmail Cottonmouth, who shoots him and leaves him for dead. Before he dies, Scarfe tells Cage and Claire Temple everything he knows about Cottonmouth's operation. Cottonmouth is subsequently arrested, but Benjamin Donovan bails him out. While addressing the fallout, Stokes gets into an argument with Dillard over their upbringing, during which he invokes memories of their uncle raping her as a child. Dillard kills Stokes and frames Cage for his death.
