= Sung J. Woo =

American novelist

- Born: June 8, 1971 (age 55); Seoul, South Korea
- Education: Cornell University (BA); New York University (MFA)
- Occupation: Writer

Sung J. Woo (born June 8, 1971) is a Korean-American writer of five works of fiction. He was born in Seoul, South Korea.

== Personal ==
Woo came to the United States in 1981, when he was ten years old. He grew up in Ocean Township, New Jersey. He received his B.A. in English from Cornell University in 1994 and received his M.F.A. in creative writing from New York University in 2006. Woo currently lives in Washington Township, Warren County, New Jersey.

== Works ==
Woo's short story Limits received the 2008 Raymond Carver Short Story Contest Editor's Choice Award from Carve Magazine.

Woo has also published non-fiction. His essays have been published in The New York Times, The New York Times Magazine and KoreAm Journal.

== Bibliography ==
=== Short stories ===
- Limits (2008)

=== Novels ===
- Everything Asian (2009), ISBN 978-0-312-53885-9.
- Love Love (2015), ISBN 978-1-593-76617-7.
- Skin Deep (2020), ISBN 978-1-947-99395-2.
- Deep Roots (2023), ISBN 978-1-957-95737-1.
- Lines (2024), ISBN 978-1-956-69250-1.
