= Micah Fowler =

American actor (born 1998)

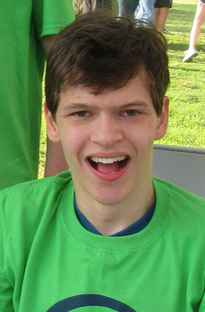
- Micah Fowler at the Shane's Inspiration 5K in Griffith Park, September 2017
- Born: Micah D. Fowler; March 5, 1998 (age 27); Barnegat Township, New Jersey, U.S.
- Occupation: Actor
- Years active: 2005–present
- Known for: Speechless
- Relatives: Kelsey Fowler (sister)

Micah D. Fowler (born March 5, 1998) is an American actor. He is best known for portraying J.J. DiMeo on the ABC sitcom Speechless.

== Early life ==
Fowler grew up in Barnegat Township, New Jersey. He grew up performing in local theater productions along with his sister, Kelsey Fowler. After Kelsey began getting roles in Broadway theatre, Fowler developed his own ambitions for an acting career.

== Career ==
Fowler started pursuing acting at the age of 5, playing roles on Blue's Clues and Sesame Street. At age 13, Fowler booked his role in Labor Day. On his eighteenth birthday, Fowler found out he had booked the role of J.J. DiMeo on Speechless. In an interview with People magazine, Fowler said that getting the role was the "best birthday present ever!"

Both Fowler and J.J. have cerebral palsy; however, Fowler is able to speak, and J.J. is not. Fowler has said that while filming, he sometimes wanted to speak after long stretches of time where he was not allowed to speak while in character. Fowler is one of the few disabled actors who have portrayed a disabled character on primetime network television.

== Ambassador for the Cerebral Palsy Foundation ==
When not performing, Fowler works as an ambassador for the Cerebral Palsy Foundation (CPF). After each episode of Speechless aired on ABC, the CPF's website posted content and short informational videos about cerebral palsy. Fowler encouraged the viewers of Speechless to use the CPF's resources, saying, "So the next time you watch Speechless, take 10 minutes to check out their post for the night."

== Personal life ==
When taking the role for Speechless, Fowler had to move from New Jersey to Los Angeles and also missed much of his sled hockey season and most of his senior year.

Fowler had previously been somewhat averse to social media; however, after joining the cast of Speechless, he created accounts on Instagram and Twitter to promote the show.

Regarding the media he grew up on, Fowler has said, "I couldn't help but notice the lack of characters dealing with disabilities." In the future, Fowler hopes to be in a Star Wars or Marvel film.

== Filmography ==
- Blue's Clues (2005)
- Sesame Street (2006)
- 2 Lives: 2 Miles Apart (2012)
- Labor Day (2013)
- Speechless (2016–2019)
