= Jay Groome =

American baseball player (born 1998)

Kansas City Monarchs – No. 32
- Pitcher
- Born: August 23, 1998 (age 28); Barnegat Township, New Jersey, U.S.
- Bats: Left Throws: Left
- Stats at Baseball Reference

Jason Joseph Groome (born August 23, 1998) is an American professional baseball pitcher for the Kansas City Monarchs of the American Association of Professional Baseball. He attended Barnegat High School in Barnegat Township, New Jersey, and was considered a top prospect in the 2016 MLB draft, where he was the 12th overall selection by the Boston Red Sox, who traded him to the San Diego Padres in 2022.

== High school career ==
Groome began high school at Barnegat High School in Barnegat Township, New Jersey. He made the school's varsity baseball team as a freshman. As a sophomore, had a 6–2 win–loss record and 0.57 earned run average (ERA) in 61 1/3 innings pitched for the school's baseball team. He transferred to the IMG Academy in Bradenton, Florida, before his junior year, and committed to attend Vanderbilt University on a college baseball scholarship. Groome pitched to a 5–0 record and a 1.22 ERA with 81 strikeouts and nine walks in 43 innings as a junior.

Due to feeling homesick, Groome opted to return to Barnegat for his senior year. However, the New Jersey State Interscholastic Athletic Association ruled that Groome was ineligible to pitch for Barnegat in April 2016 because the transfer did not involve a change of address. He regained his eligibility after 30 days, or half of Barnegat's games.

== Professional career ==
=== Boston Red Sox ===
Groome was a potential first overall pick in the 2016 MLB draft, and worked out for the Philadelphia Phillies, who had the first pick. Prior to the draft, Groome changed his college commitment from Vanderbilt to Chipola College, a junior college in Florida. He was selected 12th overall by the Boston Red Sox in the draft, falling in part due to a reported signing bonus demand of $4 million and because of his change in college commitment; teams had signability concerns. The Red Sox and Groome agreed to a $3.65 million signing bonus.

In 2016, Groome made two starts for the rookie-level Gulf Coast League Red Sox before being promoted to the Lowell Spinners of the Low-A New York-Penn League. He posted a combined 2.70 ERA with 10 strikeouts in three games for the GCL Red Sox and Lowell. Groome split the 2017 season between Lowell and the Greenville Drive of the Single-A South Atlantic League, posting a combined 3–9 record with a 5.69 ERA with 72 strikeouts across 14 appearances for both affiliates.

At the start of the 2018 season, Groome did not play, with what was initially thought to be a flexor strain. On May 9, 2018, the Red Sox announced that Groome would undergo Tommy John surgery to repair a torn ulnar collateral ligament of the elbow. In April 2019, Groome was projected to return mid-way through the 2019 season; he made his first appearance on August 21, pitching an inning for the Gulf Coast League Red Sox. After another one-inning appearance in the Gulf Coast League, Groome made one appearance with Lowell; overall for the season he pitched four innings, allowing five hits and one run (2.25 ERA). After the 2020 minor league season was cancelled due to the COVID-19 pandemic, Groome was invited to participate in the Red Sox' fall instructional league. At the end of the year, Groome was ranked by Baseball America as the Red Sox' number six prospect.

On November 20, 2020, Groome was added to the 40-man roster to protect him from the Rule 5 draft. In May 2021, he was assigned to Greenville, now a High-A affiliate. In early September, Groome was promoted to the Double-A Portland Sea Dogs. Overall for the 2021 season, Groome made 21 starts and compiled a 5–8 record with a 4.81 ERA and 134 strikeouts across 97 1/3 innings pitched.

Groome returned to Portland to start the 2022 season, where he posted a 3-4 record and 3.52 ERA with 81 strikeouts in 76 2/3 innings across 16 appearances (14 starts). The Red Sox promoted Groome to the Worcester Red Sox of the Triple-A International League on July 14, with whom he logged a 1-1 record and 3.94 ERA with 15 strikeouts over three starts.

=== San Diego Padres ===
On August 2, 2022, the Red Sox traded Groome to the San Diego Padres in exchange for Eric Hosmer, Max Ferguson, Corey Rosier, and cash considerations. The Padres assigned Groome to the El Paso Chihuahuas of the Triple-A Pacific Coast League. He made 10 starts for El Paso after the trade, posting a 3–2 record and 3.16 ERA with 44 strikeouts in 51 1/3 innings pitched.

Groome was optioned to Triple-A El Paso to begin the 2023 season, and was one of San Diego's final roster cuts after pitching to a 1.29 ERA with 13 strikeouts in 5 spring appearances. He spent the year with Triple–A El Paso, struggling to a 4–10 record and 8.55 ERA with 137 strikeouts across 30 starts.

Groome was again optioned to Triple-A El Paso to begin the 2024 season. In three starts for the Chihuahuas, he compiled a 3.60 ERA with five strikeouts across five innings pitched. On June 4, 2024, MLB suspended Groome for one year for violating their gambling policy.

On June 5, 2025, Groome was reinstated from the restricted list; however he was subsequently non-tendered by the Padres and became a free agent.

=== Kansas City Monarchs ===
On February 5, 2026, Groome signed with the Caliente de Durango of the Mexican League. However, on March 11, Groome was signed by the Kansas City Monarchs of the American Association of Professional Baseball.

== Pitching style ==
At the time of the MLB draft, Groome threw a four-seam fastball between 92–96 miles per hour (148–154 km/h), a changeup, and a curveball. After recovering from Tommy John surgery, his fastball velocity declined to 90–94 miles per hour (145–151 km/h), but he also developed a cut fastball and a two-seam fastball.

== Personal life ==
Groome has two older sisters and two younger brothers. As of November 2020, Jay Groome was living in Fort Myers, Florida. In December 2020, Groome married Amanda Muller, also of Barnegat, New Jersey; the two were expecting their first child in July 2021.
