= Elijah Boothe =

American actor

- Born: 1995 or 1996 (age 29–30)
- Occupations: Actor, Musician

Elijah Boothe is an American actor best known for his role in Netflix's Luke Cage where he plays the young Cottonmouth. Boothe has appeared in numerous television shows and feature films including Golden Boy, Blue Bloods, and the Netflix original film Coin Heist. He has won award for "Best Actor" from the San Diego Black Film Festival.

Raised in Jackson Township, New Jersey, Boothe attended the OCVTS Performing Arts Academy in Lakehurst, New Jersey.

Boothe is also a singer, and has performed for the House of Parliament, Radio Disney, the Apollo Theater, and at the U.S. Open.

== Filmography ==
=== Film ===
Year	Title	Role	Notes
2013	The Inevitable Defeat of Mister & Pete	Mister Double	
2013	Peeples	Party kid	Uncredited
2017	Coin Heist	Max	
2018	All These Small Moments	Carter	
2019	A Rainy Day in New York	Student Film Crew	
2020	City	Kendall	
2020	Pink Opaque	Travis Wolfe	

=== Television ===
Year	Title	Role	Notes
2011	The Electric Company	Various roles	2 episodes
2011	Are We There Yet?	Jr.	Episode: "The Kevin Gets a Commercial Episode"
2011	Dateline NBC	—N/a	Episode: "My Kid Would Never ... Bully"
2012	Rookie Blue	Gang Member	Episode: "Class Dismissed"
2013	Golden Boy	Michael Dupray	Episode: "Young Guns"
2014	What Would You Do?	Son	Episode #9.13
2015	Blue Bloods	Student #4	Episode: "Unsung Heroes"
2016	Unforgettable	Boy #1	Episode: "The Return of Eddie"
2016	Luke Cage	Young Cottonmouth	3 episodes
2018	Wholly Broken	Zack	Television film
