= Kelsey Fowler =

American stage and film actress

- Born: September 6, 1996 (age 28); Manhattan, New York, U.S.
- Occupation: Actress
- Relatives: Micah Fowler (brother)

Kelsey Fowler (born September 6, 1996) is an American stage and film actress. She began her professional acting career at the age of ten, performing on Broadway, and acting in television commercials and film. Kelsey has appeared on Broadway for six years, performing in four Broadway productions. She can also be seen in the Mary Poppins television commercial and the Independent Lens television documentary "Grey Gardens from East Hampton to Broadway". She has been a featured guest on "The View" and a Broadway Kids Care guest on "The Early Show". Kelsey along with Alison Horowitz won the First Place 'Presentation Award', at Broadway's 2008 Broadway Cares/Equity Fights AIDS Easter Bonnet Competition, where they performed a parody of the song, "We Do Not Belong Together" from Sunday in the Park with George.

Fowler grew up in Barnegat Township, New Jersey. Her younger brother, Micah Fowler, is also an actor.

== Career ==
=== Theatre ===
- 2006–2007, Broadway: Grey Gardens as Lee Bouvier
- 2008, Broadway: Sunday In The Park With George as Louise
- 2008–2010, Broadway & US National Tour: Mary Poppins as Jane Banks
- 2011, Broadway: Bonnie & Clyde as Young Bonnie
- 2008, Broadway Cares Equity Fights Aids Easter Bonnet 1st place Presentation Award
- 2010, Miscast Benefit at the MCC Theater

==== Past shows ====
Kelsey Fowler made her Broadway debut, at age 10, on November 2, 2006 performing the role of Lee Bouvier at The Walter Kerr Theater in the Broadway production of Grey Gardens. In October 2007, Kelsey continued performing on Broadway, portraying the role of Louise in Stephen Sondheim's revival of Sunday In The Park With George located at Studio 54. In June 2008, Kelsey began portraying the role of Jane Banks in Disney and Cameron Macintosh's Broadway Production of Mary Poppins, at the New Amsterdam Theater, on 42nd street. She went on to perform the role of Jane Banks for 22 months on Broadway and 7 months on the Mary Poppins US National Production Tour which included many prestigious venues including The Kennedy Center in Washington DC and The Fox Theater in Atlanta, Georgia. In October 2011 Kelsey originated the role of young Bonnie in the Broadway Production of Bonnie & Clyde at The Gerald Schoenfeld Theater.

=== Filmography ===
- Independent Lens (1 episode, 2007) (TV)
- This Little Light (2009)
- Made for Each Other (2009)

== Recognition ==
=== Awards and nominations ===
- 2008, First Place 'Presentation Award', at the Broadway Cares/Equity Fights AIDS (BCEFA) Easter Bonnet
