= Mike Straka =

Television journalist

Mike Straka is an American television and radio host, author and producer. He is currently the host of the "Nobody Cares" Podcast and is co-host on Knock Out Radio, an MMA radio show. He is the co-host and producer on Fighting Words with Mike Straka and Mike Madlab Iurata on TheMadLabMMa.com Previously Straka hosted The Straka and Krempel Show on WWBA Big 8 Radio, Sportstalkflorida.com, and the MMAVERICKS podcast on BLEAV networks, He is the author of Rowdy Rousey, and was host of the "MMA Noise" YouTube channel. Straka was co-host and producer on Spike TV's primetime MMA news magazine show, MMA Uncensored Live and he was the creator and the host of "TapouT Radio" on SiriusXM Sports. He served as the in-cage post fight interview correspondent for World Series of Fighting and as UFC correspondent for Fight Now TV. Straka also hosted Fighting Words with Mike Straka on Mark Cuban's HDNet which featured interviews with mixed martial arts athletes and was the creator and host of Fox Fight Game, one of the first mainstream news programs covering Mixed Martial Arts on Fox News.

Straka was a regular contributor to FIGHT! Magazine, and wrote a book on MMA, based on interviews from his television show, Fighting Words, which was published by Triumph Books. Straka was also a senior producer for FUSE TV'S "Fuse News" and has interviewed and produced several television pieces on well-known artists, including Sinead O'Connor, Zedd, Sam Smith, Naughty Boy, Wiz Khalifa, R Kelly, Lou Reed, Armin Van Buuren, Jeff Bhasker and more.

Straka was a vice president and executive producer at FOX News Digital, and also served as an on-air commentator on Hollywood and celebrity topics, as well as sports, for the cable net and on FOXNews.com. He created and produced Strategy Room. Straka hosted and was executive producer of FOX Fight Game, a mixed martial arts (MMA) features and news program, and was a columnist on FOXNews.com. Mike has interviewed some of the world's most famous artists in film and television.

== Acting career ==
Mike Straka played a ring side fight commentator in Nick Sasso's Haymaker (2021), and previously played "Young Minetta" in the film Analyze This and appeared as "Johnny" off-Broadway in Tony n' Tina's Wedding. Straka appeared in several television commercials including The Olive Garden, Papa Gino's Pizza, Healthy Choice Pasta Sauce, The Powerpuff Girls and Target.

== Early years ==
Straka was born in Newark, New Jersey and grew up in Barnegat Township. He graduated from Monsignor Donovan High School (Toms River, New Jersey), where he was on the wrestling team. He studied acting at Rutgers University and wrestled for The Scarlet Knights, and moved to New York City to begin his career, where he starred in commercials, daytime soaps and the Off-Broadway play Tony N' Tina's Wedding.

He started his career as a CBS page, ushering audiences through the West 57th Street studios to see talk shows like Geraldo Rivera and Joan Rivers, and giving tours and answering phones throughout the building.
