= Donovan Catholic High School =

High school in Ocean County, New Jersey, US

Location
- 711 Hooper Avenue; Toms River, (Ocean County), New Jersey 08753; United States
- 39°57′40″N 74°11′19″W

Information
- Type: Private, Coeducational
- Motto: "It makes a difference"
- Religious affiliation: Catholic Church
- Established: 1962
- School district: Diocese of Trenton
- NCES School ID: 00867458
- Director: G. Scott Shaffer
- Principal: Darryl Heale
- Faculty: 37.8 FTEs
- Grades: 9–12
- Student to teacher ratio: 14.6:1
- Colors: Royal blue and white
- Athletics conference: Shore Conference
- Nickname: MonDon
- Team name: Griffins
- Accreditation: AdvancED
- Tuition: $14,910 (2023-24)
- Website: www.donovancatholic.org

Donovan Catholic High School, (formerly Monsignor Donovan High School) is a Roman Catholic high school located in Toms River, in Ocean County, in the U.S. state of New Jersey. Operating under the supervision of the Roman Catholic Diocese of Trenton, it is the county's only Catholic high school. Located in the coastal community of Toms River Township, the school originally opened in 1962 as St. Joseph High School, but was renamed as Monsignor Donovan High School in 1983, after founder Monsignor Lawrence Donovan. The school adopted its current name in 2014.

Donovan Catholic became an IB World School in January 2017, offering students the IB Diploma Programme. The school is accredited by AdvancED.

As of the 2023–24 school year, the school had an enrollment of 553 students and 37.8 classroom teachers (on an FTE basis), for a student–teacher ratio of 14.6:1. The school's student body was 90.6% (501) White, 3.1% (17) Hispanic, 2.7% (15) Black, 1.8% (10) Asian and 1.8% (10) two or more races.

The school mascot is the Griffin. In the 1960s, the school (then St. Joseph High School) sponsored a contest to name the mascot. Finalists were chosen by the faculty from the submissions, and then the students voted on the finalists. The winning name was George.

== Athletics ==
The Donovan Catholic High School Griffins compete in Division B South of the Shore Conference, an athletic conference comprised of public and private high schools in Monmouth and Ocean counties along the Jersey Shore. The league operates under the jurisdiction of the New Jersey State Interscholastic Athletic Association. With 540 students in grades 10–12, the school was classified by the NJSIAA for the 2019–20 school year as Non-Public A for most athletic competition purposes, which included schools with an enrollment of 381 to 1,454 students in that grade range (which is equivalent to Group II for public schools). The school was classified by the NJSIAA as Non-Public Group B (equivalent to Group I/II for public schools) for football for 2024–2026, which included schools with 140 to 686 students.

The athletic teams compete in the following sports: football, soccer, powerlifting, baseball, hockey, basketball, swimming, gymnastics, cheerleading, softball, lacrosse, tennis, golf, wrestling, track and field, volleyball, sailing, bowling, and cross country running.

The school participates with Red Bank Catholic High School in a joint ice hockey team in which St. Rose High School is the host school / lead agency. The co-op program operates under agreements scheduled to expire at the end of the 2023–24 school year.

The girls spring track team was the Non-Public A state champion in 2004.

The girls cross country team won the Non-Public A state championship in 2004 and 2007.

The Donovan Catholic sailing team won the New Jersey High School Sailing Championship in 2005, 2006 and 2007. They also won the CT State High School Sailing Championship in 2005 and 2008. In a period of six years, the M.D.H.S. Sailing Team has qualified for the Interscholastic Sailing Association National Championship four times.

The Donovan Catholic boys' bowling team succeeded in the winter of 2006–07, finishing with a 34–11 record and taking home the titles of divisional champions, Shore Conference tournament champions and South Jersey Group II state sectional champions.

The boys track team won the spring / outdoor track state championship in Non-Public A in 2008.

The boys' and girls' varsity bowling teams both took 1st place in the Shore Conference in the 2009–10 season, and the Boys took 2nd place in the Sectionals Tournament, and in the States tournament, took 2nd place in their group

The Donovan Catholic girls' swimming team won the Ocean County Championship for the first time in school history during the 2007–08 season, a first for a non-public school, then repeated in 2008–09.

In 2008, the men's track and field team won the state championship.

The softball team won the Non-Public A state title in 2019 (defeating Mount Saint Dominic Academy in the tournament final), 2021 (vs. Immaculate Heart Academy) and 2022 (vs. Mount Saint Dominic Academy). The team won the Tournament of Champions in 2019 and 2022, becoming the first team to win a second ToC title. The 2019 softball team defeated Mount Saint Dominic Academy by a score of 11–1 in the final of the tournament to win the Non-Public A state championship, the program's first state title. The 2019 team went into the Tournament of Champions as the top-seeded team and finished the season with a 30–2 record after winning the overall title by a score of 10–0 in five innings under the mercy rule against runner-up Cedar Grove High School, the second-seeded team. NJ.com ranked Donovan Catholic as their number-one softball team in the state in 2019.

== Extracurricular activities ==
The school's mock trial team won the Ocean County tournament in 2008 and 2009.

== Notable alumni ==
- John Cudia (born 1970, class of 1988), Broadway actor
- Page Falkinburg (born 1956, class of 1974, but transferred to Point Pleasant Boro High School before graduating), professional wrestler
- Scott Palguta (born 1982, class of 2001), head men's soccer coach at Colorado College and former professional soccer player with the Colorado Rapids of Major League Soccer
- Mike Straka (class of 1988), Fox News journalist
- Glenn Taranto (born 1958/59, class of 1977), actor and screenwriter, who played Gomez Addams in The New Addams Family
