= Barnegat Light =

Barnegat Light may refer to:

- Barnegat Light, New Jersey, a borough in New Jersey
- Barnegat Lighthouse, a lighthouse in the borough of Barnegat Light
