= Barnegat Township, New Jersey =

Township in Ocean County, New Jersey, US

- Township
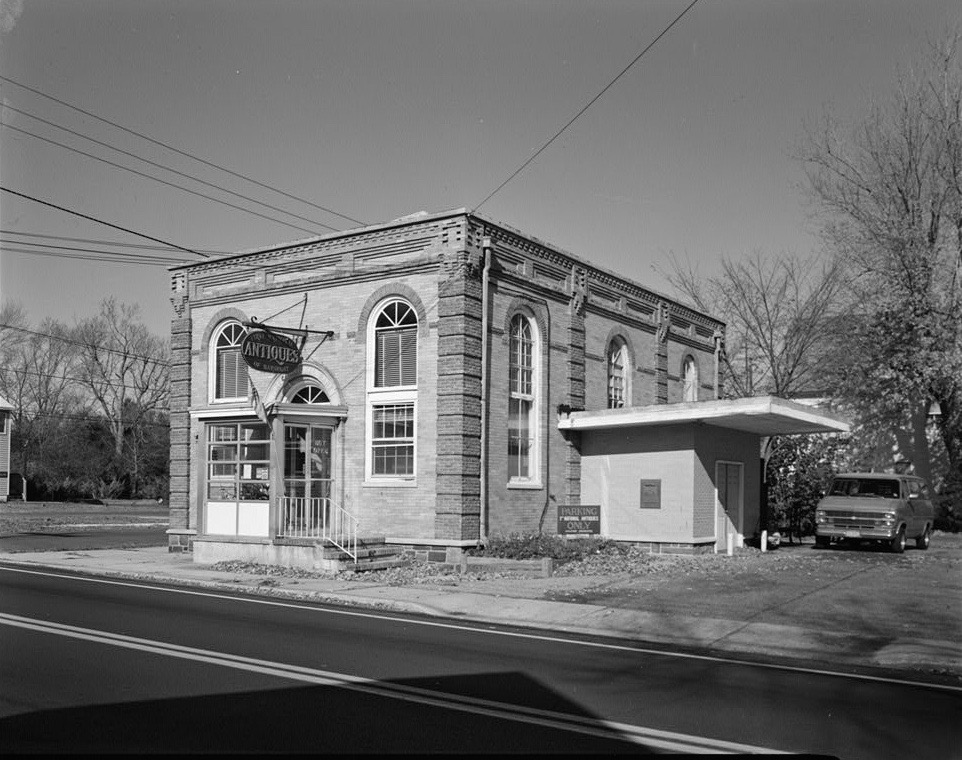
- Former bank on West Bay Avenue

- Seal

- Location of Barnegat Township in Ocean County highlighted in red (right). Inset map: Location of Ocean County in New Jersey highlighted in orange (left).

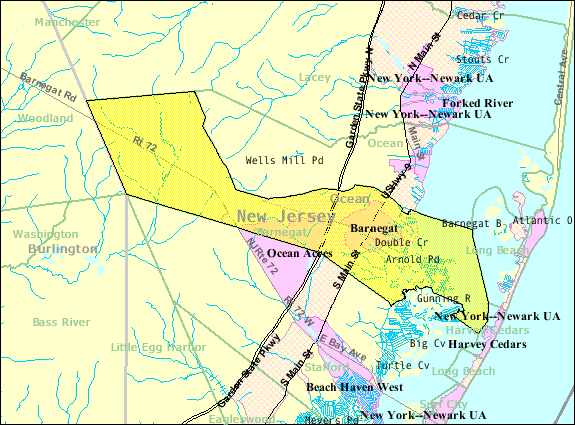
- Census Bureau map of Barnegat Township, New Jersey

- Location in Ocean County Location in New Jersey Location in the United States
- Coordinates: 39.768515°N 74.27688°W
- Country: United States
- State: New Jersey
- County: Ocean
- Incorporated: March 10, 1846 (as Union Township)
- Renamed: January 1, 1977 (as Barnegat Township)
- Named for: Dutch language "Barende-gat" (meaning "breaker's inlet")

Government
  - Type: Township
  - Body: Township Committee
  - Mayor: Pasquale "Pat" Pipi (R, term ends December 31, 2026)
  - Administrator: Martin J. Lisella
  - Municipal clerk: Lauren L. Romano

Area
  - Total: 40.41 sq mi (104.65 km^{2})
  - Land: 34.00 sq mi (88.07 km^{2})
  - Water: 6.40 sq mi (16.58 km^{2}) 15.85%
  - Rank: 53rd of 565 in state 8th of 33 in county
- Elevation: 112 ft (34 m)

Population (2020)
  - Total: 24,296
  - Estimate (2023): 25,629
  - Rank: 109th of 565 in state 9th of 33 in county
  - Density: 709.6/sq mi (274.0/km^{2})
  - Rank: 419th of 565 in state 23rd of 33 in county
- Time zone: UTC−05:00 (Eastern (EST))
  - Summer (DST): UTC−04:00 (Eastern (EDT))
- ZIP Code: 08005
- Area codes: 609
- FIPS code: 3402903050
- GNIS feature ID: 0882070
- Website: www.barnegat.net

Barnegat Township (pronounced "BAR-nuh-git") is a township in Ocean County, in the U.S. state of New Jersey. As of the 2020 United States census, the township's population was 24,296, the highest ever count at a decennial census and an increase of 3,360 (+16.0%) from the 2010 census count of 20,936, which in turn reflected an increase of 5,666 (+37.1%) from the 15,270 counted in the 2000 census.

What is now Barnegat Township was originally incorporated as Union Township on March 10, 1846, from portions of both Dover Township (now Toms River Township) and Stafford Township, while the area was still part of Monmouth County. It became part of the newly formed Ocean County on February 15, 1850. Portions of the township were taken to form Lacey Township (March 23, 1871), Ocean Township (April 13, 1876), Harvey Cedars (December 13, 1894) and Long Beach Township (March 23, 1899). Union Township changed its name to Barnegat Township as of January 1, 1977.

== History ==
Barnegat's name can be traced back to Dutch explorers who, in 1614, mapped the coastline of the nearby Barnegat Bay and Barnegat Inlet. The original name for the inlet was "Barendegat" or "Barnde Gat," which translates to "inlet of the breakers" or "surf cove". These names were given due to the turbulent channel of the inlet, which is characterized by strong currents and choppy waters. An alternative theory suggests that "Barndegat" is a Dutch term meaning "a pool created from a dike breach".

Long before European settlers arrived, the Lenape Native Americans inhabited the region, including the area now known as Barnegat. The Lenape would spend their summers along the shore, collecting and roasting clams for sustenance during the winter months. They also fished, hunted, and gathered various fruits and nuts found in the area.

European settlers, primarily Dutch, English, and Swedes, began to arrive in the Barnegat area around 1720. These settlers were attracted to the region's fertile land, abundant natural resources, and proximity to the coastline. The first permanent homes in Barnegat were constructed around 1750, as the settlers established farms, fisheries, and other small businesses.

Barnegat played a role in the American Revolutionary War, as one of the last skirmishes of the conflict took place near the site of the Cedar Bridge Tavern in 1782. Known as the "Battle of Cedar Bridge," this encounter involved Patriot forces clashing with Loyalist troops and local Pine Robbers, who took advantage of the war's chaos to engage in banditry. The Patriots eventually emerged victorious, marking a symbolic end to the Revolutionary War in New Jersey.

== Geography ==
According to the United States Census Bureau, the township had a total area of 40.41 square miles (104.65 km^{2}), including 34,00 square miles (88.07 km^{2}) of land and 6.40 square miles (16.58 km^{2}) of water (15.85%).

Barnegat CDP (2010 Census population of 2,817) is an unincorporated community and census-designated place (CDP) located within Barnegat Township, while Ocean Acres (16,142, of which 925 are in Barnegat and 15,217 are in Stafford) is a census-designated place and unincorporated area split between Barnegat Township and Stafford Township.

The township borders the Ocean County municipalities of Harvey Cedars, Lacey Township, Little Egg Harbor Township, Long Beach Township, Ocean Township and Stafford Township; and both Bass River Township and Woodland Township in Burlington County.

Other unincorporated communities, localities and place names located partially or completely within the township include Cedar Bridge, Howardsville, Lower Dock and Upper Dock.

== Demographics ==
Historical population
| Census | Pop. | Note | %± |
|---|---|---|---|
| 1850 | 1,759 | | — |
| 1860 | 1,918 | | 9.0% |
| 1870 | 1,923 | | 0.3% |
| 1880 | 1,024 | * | −46.7% |
| 1890 | 1,063 | | 3.8% |
| 1900 | 955 | * | −10.2% |
| 1910 | 982 | | 2.8% |
| 1920 | 803 | | −18.2% |
| 1930 | 1,037 | | 29.1% |
| 1940 | 1,045 | | 0.8% |
| 1950 | 1,173 | | 12.2% |
| 1960 | 1,270 | | 8.3% |
| 1970 | 1,539 | | 21.2% |
| 1980 | 8,702 | | 465.4% |
| 1990 | 12,235 | | 40.6% |
| 2000 | 15,270 | | 24.8% |
| 2010 | 20,936 | | 37.1% |
| 2020 | 24,296 | | 16.0% |
| 2023 (est.) | 25,629 | ▲ | 5.5% |
Population sources: 1850–2000; 1850–1920 1850–1870; 1850 1870 1880–1890; 1890–1910 1910–1930; 1940–2000 2000; 2010 2020 * = Lost territory in previous decade.

=== 2010 census ===
The 2010 United States census counted 20,936 people, 8,128 households, and 6,039 families in the township. The population density was 609.0 inhabitants per square mile (235.1/km^{2}). There were 9,085 housing units at an average density of 264.3 per square mile (102.0/km^{2}). The racial makeup was 91.77% (19,214) White, 3.25% (681) Black or African American, 0.14% (30) Native American, 1.73% (363) Asian, 0.00% (1) Pacific Islander, 1.27% (265) from other races, and 1.82% (382) from two or more races. Hispanic or Latino of any race were 6.78% (1,420) of the population.

Of the 8,128 households, 26.1% had children under the age of 18; 61.6% were married couples living together; 9.3% had a female householder with no husband present and 25.7% were non-families. Of all households, 21.8% were made up of individuals and 12.6% had someone living alone who was 65 years of age or older. The average household size was 2.56 and the average family size was 2.98.

20.9% of the population were under the age of 18, 7.1% from 18 to 24, 20.8% from 25 to 44, 27.1% from 45 to 64, and 24.1% who were 65 years of age or older. The median age was 45.9 years. For every 100 females, the population had 91.7 males. For every 100 females ages 18 and older there were 88.5 males.

The Census Bureau's 2006–2010 American Community Survey showed that (in 2010 inflation-adjusted dollars) median household income was $60,440 (with a margin of error of +/− $3,408) and the median family income was $68,504 (+/− $5,322). Males had a median income of $55,282 (+/− $4,415) versus $39,681 (+/− $4,254) for females. The per capita income for the township was $29,192 (+/− $1,549). About 6.6% of families and 6.9% of the population were below the poverty line, including 8.3% of those under age 18 and 4.5% of those age 65 or over.

=== 2000 census ===
As of the 2000 United States census there were 15,270 people, 5,493 households, and 4,191 families residing in the township. The population density was 440.4 inhabitants per square mile (170.0/km^{2}). There were 6,066 housing units at an average density of 175.0 per square mile (67.6/km^{2}). The racial makeup of the township was 94.75% White, 2.21% African American, 0.09% Native American, 1.00% Asian, 0.70% from other races, and 1.25% from two or more races. Hispanic or Latino of any race were 3.86% of the population.

There were 5,493 households, out of which 35.3% had children under the age of 18 living with them, 63.0% were married couples living together, 9.7% had a female householder with no husband present, and 23.7% were non-families. 20.2% of all households were made up of individuals, and 12.0% had someone living alone who was 65 years of age or older. The average household size was 2.76 and the average family size was 3.19.

In the township the population was spread out, with 27.1% under the age of 18, 6.6% from 18 to 24, 26.0% from 25 to 44, 22.4% from 45 to 64, and 17.9% who were 65 years of age or older. The median age was 39 years. For every 100 females, there were 93.0 males. For every 100 females age 18 and over, there were 88.6 males.

The median income for a household in the township was $48,572, and the median income for a family was $56,093. Males had a median income of $42,460 versus $28,452 for females. The per capita income for the township was $19,307. About 5.1% of families and 6.2% of the population were below the poverty line, including 9.7% of those under age 18 and 4.9% of those age 65 or over.

== Government ==
=== Local government ===
Barnegat Township is governed under the Township form of New Jersey municipal government, one of 141 municipalities (of the 564) statewide that use this form, the second-most commonly used form of government in the state. The Township Committee is comprised of five members, who are elected directly by the voters at-large in partisan elections to serve three-year terms of office on a staggered basis, with either one or two seats coming up for election each year as part of the November general election in a three-year cycle. At an annual reorganization meeting, the Township Committee selects one of its members to serve as Mayor and another as Deputy Mayor.

As of 2026, members of the Barnegat Township Committee are Mayor Pasquale "Pat" Pipi (R, term on committee and as mayor ends December 31, 2026), Deputy Mayor Pasquale "Pat" Pipi (R, term on committee and as mayor ends December 31, 2026), Deputy Mayor Fredric S. Rubenstein (R, term on committee ends 2028; term as deputy mayor ends 2026), Alfonso Cirulli (R, 2026), Joseph Marte (R, 2026) and Jake Townsend (R, 2027).

In November 2015, Martin J. Lisella stepped down from the Township Committee to take a position as the township's business administrator. In December 2015, the Township Committee selected former mayor Alfonso Cirulli from a list of three candidates nominated by the Republican municipal committee to fill Lisella's vacant seat expiring in December 2017; Cirulli will serve on an interim basis until the November 2016 general election, when voters will select a candidate to serve the balance of the term of office.

=== Federal, state, and county representation ===
Barnegat Township is located in the 2nd Congressional district and is part of New Jersey's 9th state legislative district.

For the 119th United States Congress, New Jersey's 2nd congressional district is represented by Jeff Van Drew (R, Dennis Township). New Jersey is represented in the United States Senate by Democrats Cory Booker (Newark, term ends 2027) and Andy Kim (Moorestown, term ends 2031).

For the 2026–2027 session, the 9th legislative district of the New Jersey Legislature is represented in the State Senate by Carmen Amato (R, Berkeley Township) and in the General Assembly by Greg Myhre (R, Stafford Township) and Brian E. Rumpf (R, Little Egg Harbor Township).

Ocean County is governed by a Board of County Commissioners composed of five members who are elected on an at-large basis in partisan elections and serving staggered three-year terms of office, with either one or two seats coming up for election each year as part of the November general election. At an annual reorganization held in the beginning of January, the board chooses a director and a deputy director from among its members. As of 2025, Ocean County's Commissioners (with party affiliation, term-end year and residence) are:

John P. Kelly (R, 2025, Eagleswood Township), Virginia E. Haines (R, 2025, Toms River), Robert Arace (R, Manchester Township, 2027) Jennifer Bacchione (R, Berkeley Township, 2027) and Frank Sadeghi (R, 2026, Toms River).

Constitutional officers elected on a countywide basis are: Clerk Scott M. Colabella (R, 2025, Barnegat Light), Sheriff Michael G. Mastronardy (R, 2025; Toms River) and Surrogate Jeffrey Moran (R, 2028, Beachwood).

=== Politics ===
As of March 2011, there were a total of 14,604 registered voters in Barnegat Township, of which 3,163 (21.7%) were registered as Democrats, 3,666 (25.1%) were registered as Republicans and 7,767 (53.2%) were registered as Unaffiliated. There were 8 voters registered as Libertarians or Greens. Among the township's 2010 Census population, 69.8% (vs. 63.2% in Ocean County) were registered to vote, including 88.2% of those ages 18 and over (vs. 82.6% countywide).

Gubernatorial election results for Barnegat Township
| Year | Republican | | Democratic | | Third party(ies) | |
| Year | No. | % | No. | % | No. | % |
|---|---|---|---|---|---|---|
| 2025 | 7,208 | 59.55% | 4,839 | 39.98% | 57 | 0.47% |
| 2021 | 6,205 | 64.94% | 3,294 | 34.47% | 56 | 0.59% |
| 2017 | 3,925 | 60.48% | 2,440 | 37.60% | 125 | 1.93% |
| 2013 | 4,981 | 73.97% | 1,645 | 24.43% | 108 | 1.60% |
| 2009 | 4,685 | 64.33% | 2,169 | 29.78% | 429 | 5.89% |
| 2005 | 3,428 | 54.29% | 2,623 | 41.54% | 263 | 4.17% |

In the 2012 presidential election, Republican Mitt Romney received 53.9% of the vote (5,670 cast), ahead of Democrat Barack Obama with 44.8% (4,711 votes), and other candidates with 1.3% (132 votes), among the 10,605 ballots cast by the township's 15,321 registered voters (92 ballots were spoiled), for a turnout of 69.2%. In the 2008 presidential election, Republican John McCain received 54.9% of the vote (5,910 cast), ahead of Democrat Barack Obama with 42.9% (4,620 votes) and other candidates with 1.4% (147 votes), among the 10,769 ballots cast by the township's 14,805 registered voters, for a turnout of 72.7%. In the 2004 presidential election, Republican George W. Bush received 57.8% of the vote (5,223 ballots cast), outpolling Democrat John Kerry with 40.4% (3,655 votes) and other candidates with 0.7% (87 votes), among the 9,037 ballots cast by the township's 12,465 registered voters, for a turnout percentage of 72.5.

Presidential Elections Results
| Year | Republican | Democratic | Third Parties |
|---|---|---|---|
| 2024 | 61.8% 9,499 | 36.9% 5,666 | 1.3% 173 |
| 2020 | 59.4% 8,864 | 38.9% 5,804 | 1.7% 200 |
| 2016 | 62.8% 7,155 | 34.0% 3,868 | 3.2% 364 |
| 2012 | 53.9% 5,670 | 44.8% 4,711 | 1.3% 132 |
| 2008 | 54.9% 5,910 | 42.9% 4,620 | 1.4% 147 |
| 2004 | 57.8% 5,223 | 40.4% 3,655 | 0.7% 87 |

In the 2013 gubernatorial election, Republican Chris Christie received 74.0% of the vote (4,981 cast), ahead of Democrat Barbara Buono with 24.4% (1,645 votes), and other candidates with 1.6% (108 votes), among the 6,868 ballots cast by the township's 15,399 registered voters (134 ballots were spoiled), for a turnout of 44.6%. In the 2009 gubernatorial election, Republican Chris Christie received 63.6% of the vote (4,685 ballots cast), ahead of Democrat Jon Corzine with 29.5% (2,169 votes), Independent Chris Daggett with 4.8% (354 votes) and other candidates with 1.0% (75 votes), among the 7,363 ballots cast by the township's 14,585 registered voters, yielding a 50.5% turnout.

United States Senate election results for Barnegat Township1
| Year | Republican | | Democratic | | Third party(ies) | |
| Year | No. | % | No. | % | No. | % |
|---|---|---|---|---|---|---|
| 2024 | 8,601 | 58.35% | 6,026 | 40.88% | 113 | 0.77% |
| 2018 | 5,773 | 61.61% | 3,305 | 35.27% | 292 | 3.12% |
| 2012 | 5,227 | 52.54% | 4,521 | 45.44% | 201 | 2.02% |
| 2006 | 3,359 | 57.03% | 2,352 | 39.93% | 179 | 3.04% |

United States Senate election results for Barnegat Township2
| Year | Republican | | Democratic | | Third party(ies) | |
| Year | No. | % | No. | % | No. | % |
|---|---|---|---|---|---|---|
| 2020 | 8,553 | 59.15% | 5,675 | 39.24% | 233 | 1.61% |
| 2014 | 3,214 | 55.55% | 2,442 | 42.21% | 130 | 2.25% |
| 2013 | 2,500 | 58.69% | 1,728 | 40.56% | 32 | 0.75% |
| 2008 | 5,474 | 55.11% | 4,260 | 42.89% | 199 | 2.00% |

== Education ==
The Barnegat Township School District serves public school students in pre-kindergarten through twelfth grade. As of the 2021–22 school year, the district, comprised of six schools, had an enrollment of 3,583 students and 272.5 classroom teachers (on an FTE basis), for a student–teacher ratio of 13.1:1. Schools in the district (with 2021-22 enrollment data from the National Center for Education Statistics) are Lillian M. Dunfee Elementary School with 293 students in PreK, Cecil S. Collins Elementary School with 759 students in grades K-2, Joseph T. Donahue Elementary School with 479 students in grades 3-4, Robert L. Horbelt Elementary School with 498 students in grades 5-6, Russell O. Brackman Middle School with 552 students in grades 7-8 and Barnegat High School with 971 students in grades 9-12.

St. Mary Academy near Manahawkin, a K–8 school of the Roman Catholic Diocese of Trenton, is managed by St. Mary Church of Barnegat. From 1997, until 2019 it operated as All Saints Regional Catholic School and was collectively managed by five churches. In 2019 St. Mary took entire control of the school, which remained on the same Manahawkin campus, and changed its name. The other churches no longer operate the school but still may send students there.

== Transportation ==
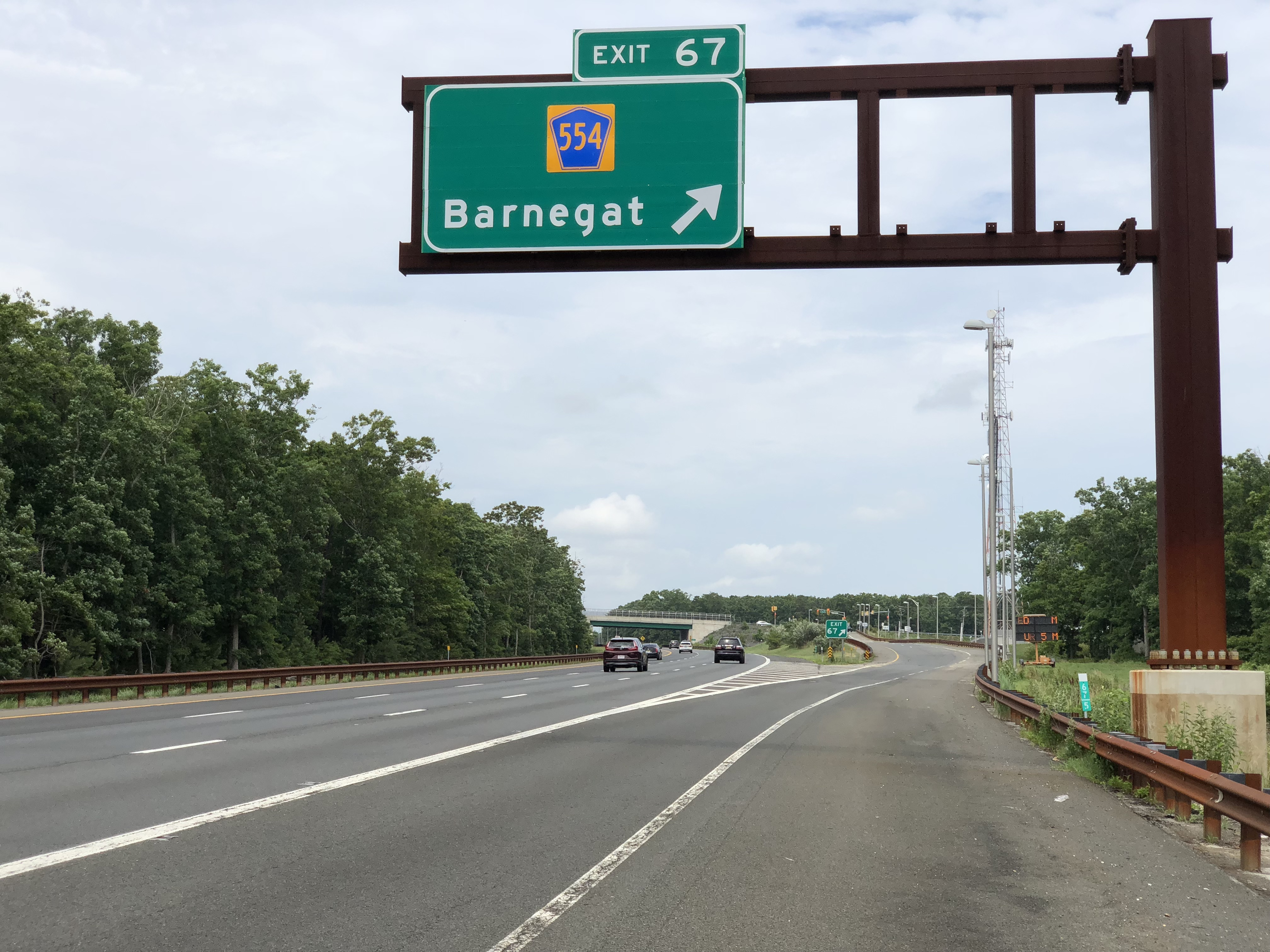
The northbound Garden State Parkway at exit 67 in Barnegat Township

=== Roads and highways ===
As of May 2010, the township had a total of 120.87 miles (194.52 km) of roadways, of which 84.99 miles (136.78 km) were maintained by the municipality, 23.69 miles (38.13 km) by Ocean County, 9.88 miles (15.90 km) by the New Jersey Department of Transportation and 2.33 miles (3.75 km) by the New Jersey Turnpike Authority.

The main highway serving Barnegat Township is the Garden State Parkway, which traverses the township north-to-south near the center of the township. U.S. Route 9 also traverses Barnegat Township north-to-south towards the east side of the township. New Jersey Route 72 and County Route 539 are the main roads serving the western portion of the township. County Route 554 traverses most of the township from west-to-east and connects with the other major roads except CR 539.

=== Public transportation ===
NJ Transit provides bus service to and from Atlantic City on the 559 bus route.

== Media ==
WBNJ 91.9 FM is licensed to Barnegat.

The Asbury Park Press provides daily news coverage of the town as does WOBM-FM radio. The government of the town provides columns and commentary to The Southern Ocean Times, which is one of seven weekly papers from Micromedia Publications.

== In popular culture ==
Barnegat's annual Pirate Festival was featured in the Spike TV show 1000 Ways to Die, which shows fictional clips of unusual deaths. In that particular episode, it showed a sword-swallower who tried to swallow an umbrella, puncturing his esophagus and killing him. The incident is said to have taken place in 2007, although there are no records of this actually happening.

Phoenix, the first steamboat to sail the open ocean, traveling from New York to Philadelphia in June 1809, made harbor at Barnegat to wait out a storm that occurred during its voyage.

== Notable people ==
People who were born in, residents of, or otherwise closely associated with Barnegat Township include:

- Juan Agudelo (born 1992), soccer player for Inter Miami CF and the United States men's national soccer team
- Arthur Collins (1864–1933), baritone who was one of the most prolific and beloved of pioneer recording artists, regarded in his day as "King of the Ragtime Singers"
- Kelsey Fowler (born 1996), actress
- Micah Fowler (born 1998), actor with cerebral palsy who appeared in Labor Day and as JJ DiMeo in the television series Speechless
- Jay Groome (born 1998), professional baseball pitcher who attended Barnegat High School, and was drafted 12th overall by the Boston Red Sox in the 2016 Major League Baseball draft
- Brigid Harrington (born 2000), actress
- Robert P. Hollenbeck (1931–2021), politician who served six terms in the New Jersey General Assembly from the 36th Legislative District
- Heather McComb (born 1977), actress
- Frank Molinaro (born 1988), wrestler who competed as a member of the U.S. team at the 2016 Summer Olympics
- Tony Perez (1931–2022), boxing referee and judge
- Ernestine Petras (1924–2017), infielder who played from 1944 through 1952 in the All-American Girls Professional Baseball League
- Mike Straka, television host, author, and producer who co-hosted Spike TV's "MMA Uncensored Live"
- Henry R. Tilton (1836–1906), army surgeon who was awarded the Medal of Honor for his actions at the Battle of Bear Paw in 1877
