= Marine Academy of Technology and Environmental Science =

High school in Ocean County, New Jersey, US

Location
- 195 Cedar Bridge Road; Stafford Township, Ocean County, New Jersey 08050; United States; 39.7169°N 74.2541°W

Information
- Type: Magnet public high school
- Established: September 2001
- School district: Ocean County Vocational School District
- NCES School ID: 341198000559
- Principal: Paul DeFrancesco; Alison Carroll
- Faculty: 22.0 FTEs
- Grades: 9-12
- Enrollment: 275 (as of 2024–25)
- Student to teacher ratio: 12.5:1
- Accreditation: Middle States Association of Colleges and Schools
- Publication: The MATES Messenger
- Website: www.ocvts.org/mates

The Marine Academy of Technology and Environmental Science (MATES) is a comprehensive, selective magnet public high school with a focus on marine and environmental science that is part of the Ocean County Vocational School District. The school is located in the Manahawkin section of Stafford Township, in Ocean County, in the U.S. state of New Jersey directly behind the buildings of the Southern Regional School District and a joint parking lot with Ocean County College's Southern Education Center. As a public school, students attend the school at no charge. Prospective students must complete the application process which includes an entrance exam. The school has been accredited by the Middle States Association of Colleges and Schools Commission on Elementary and Secondary Schools since 2005 and is accredited until January 2032.

As of the 2024–25 school year, the school had an enrollment of 275 students and 22.0 classroom teachers (on an FTE basis), for a student–teacher ratio of 12.5:1. There were 25 students (9.1% of enrollment) eligible for free lunch and 10 (3.6% of students) eligible for reduced-cost lunch.

Students may be eligible to take college-level courses throughout their course of study.

== Awards, recognition and rankings ==
In 2012, MATES became one of 17 New Jersey schools to be named a 2012 National Blue Ribbon School of Excellence by the United States Department of Education.

In its listing of "America's Best High Schools 2016", the school was ranked 84th out of 500 best high schools in the country; it was ranked 17th among all high schools in New Jersey. Schooldigger.com ranked the school as one of 16 schools tied for first out of 381 public high schools statewide in its 2011 rankings (unchanged from the 2010 ranking) which were based on the combined percentage of students classified as proficient or above proficient on the language arts literacy (100.0%) and mathematics (100.0%) components of the High School Proficiency Assessment (HSPA).

== See also ==
- Marine Academy of Science and Technology in Monmouth County, NJ
