= Barnegat High School =

High school in Ocean County, New Jersey, US

Location
- 180 Bengal Boulevard; Barnegat Township, Ocean County, New Jersey 08005; United States; 39.769674°N 74.232635°W

Information
- Type: Public high school
- Established: 2004
- School district: Barnegat Township School District
- NCES School ID: 341647000557
- Principal: Patrick Magee
- Faculty: 87.0 FTEs
- Grades: 9-12
- Enrollment: 1,003 (as of 2024–25)
- Student to teacher ratio: 11.5:1
- Colors: Black; Orange; White
- Athletics conference: Shore Conference
- Team name: Bengals
- Website: www.barnegatschools.com/o/bhs

Barnegat High School is a comprehensive community public high school that serves students in the ninth through twelfth grades from Barnegat Township, in Ocean County, in the U.S. state of New Jersey, operating as a part of the Barnegat Township School District.

Barnegat High School opened in September 2004 with only freshmen enrolled. There were no upperclassmen until 2006, when the first incoming class became juniors. It progressed this way until all four classes were in place beginning in September 2007. The first graduation ceremony took place in June 2008. Barnegat students who were already attending Southern Regional High School, prior to the opening of Barnegat High School, remained there until their graduation. The final year that Barnegat residents attended Southern Regional was the 2006–07 school year, with 267 seniors at Southern Regional High School in Stafford Township representing the final group attending under a sending/receiving relationship with the Southern Regional School District, which is now ended. Barnegat High School is now used by Barnegat residents enrolled in grades nine through twelve.

As of the 2024–25 school year, the school had an enrollment of 1,003 students and 87.0 classroom teachers (on an FTE basis), for a student–teacher ratio of 11.5:1. There were 360 students (35.9% of enrollment) eligible for free lunch and 70 (7.0% of students) eligible for reduced-cost lunch.

== Awards, recognition and rankings ==
The school was the 186th-ranked public high school in New Jersey out of 339 schools statewide in New Jersey Monthly magazine's September 2014 cover story on the state's "Top Public High Schools", using a new ranking methodology. The school had been ranked 183rd of 328 schools in the state in 2012, after being ranked 193rd in 2010, out of 322 schools listed.

Schooldigger.com ranked the school 187th out of 381 public high schools statewide in its 2011 rankings (a decrease of 36 positions from its 2010 ranking), based on the combined percentage of students classified as proficient or above proficient on the two components of the High School Proficiency Assessment (HSPA), mathematics (82.5%) and language arts literacy (89.6%).

== Facility ==
The school's building was completed in Barnegat Township under the supervision of the New Jersey Schools Construction Corporation. The 156,000-square-foot (14,500 m^{2}), two-story building is located on a 66-acre (270,000 m^{2}) campus, and includes 29 classrooms, six science labs, two technology labs, art and music rooms, cafeteria, media center, gymnasium, weight room and a 600-seat auditorium. The campus includes six athletic fields and a track. The new building opened to students in September 2004, with ribbon cutting ceremonies held on November 13, 2004. A contract for a second phase of work was awarded on October 16, 2006, and was scheduled to include 50,000 square feet (5,000 m^{2}) of new space, including 28 additional classrooms and an alternate gymnasium.

== Athletics ==
The Barnegat High School mascot is the Bengal tiger. The Bengals compete in Division B South of the Shore Conference, an athletic conference comprised of public and private high schools in Monmouth and Ocean counties along the Jersey Shore. The league operates under the jurisdiction of the New Jersey State Interscholastic Athletic Association (NJSIAA). With 684 students in grades 10–12, the school was classified by the NJSIAA for the 2019–20 school year as Group II for most athletic competition purposes, which included schools with an enrollment of 486 to 758 students in that grade range. The school was classified by the NJSIAA as Group III South for football for 2024–2026, which included schools with 695 to 882 students.

The school participates as the host school / lead agency in a joint ice hockey team with Lacey Township High School. The co-op program operates under agreements scheduled to expire at the end of the 2023–24 school year.

As of the 2009 season, 10 varsity football players had moved on to NCAA college play in the first five seasons of the program. The varsity track teams had successful 2010 spring track seasons, with the women's team going 6-1 (winning B-South) and the men's team finishing undefeated with a 7–0 record for the first time ever and winning B-South.

== Music ==
Barnegat High School's music department offers a wide range of musical ensembles and academic classes. Instrumental ensembles include the 9th grade Concert Band and intermediate Band, directed by McGrath. He also directs the advanced Wind Ensemble and Jazz Ensemble. Smaller groups include the Brass Ensemble and Pit Orchestra. The ensembles perform and compete numerous times throughout the year. The department's dedication to high-quality musical performance has been recognized throughout the state.

Academic classes offered by the music department include Intro to Music, Intro to Film, 20th Century Music, Music Theory I, AP Music Theory and Classical Guitar Workshop.

The department also includes an award-winning marching band. The Barnegat High School Marching Bengals compete in Tournament of Bands Chapter 1 as a Group II band. In 2008 and 2009, the Marching Bengals were named the Group II Regional Champions in Chapter 1. The band currently competes in group I and placed 2nd in the Chapter I Championships with a score of 89.9. The Color Guard placed 1st. They also received Best Visual.

== Administration ==
The school's principal is Patrick Magee. His administration team includes three assistant principals.

== Notable alumni ==
- Jay Groome (born 1998, class of 2016), professional baseball pitcher
- Brigid Harrington (Class of 2018), Broadway and Disney Channel actress
