= East Lynne Theater Company =

The East Lynne Theater Company, based in Cape May, New Jersey, is a non-profit, professional theater company founded in 1980 by Warren Kliewer. At the time, there was no theater company in the United States dedicated to classics of the American stage. Kliewer saw the need to change this, and created a company where theatergoers, actors, and directors could experience entertaining and provocative plays by American masters such as Washington Irving, Rachel Crothers, and Eugene O’Neill. Many of the company's productions have not been produced for over fifty years, and in some cases, almost ninety.

== Overview ==
East Lynne Theater Company (ELTC) presents works by the current generation of playwrights, with world and New Jersey premieres based on American literature and history, many of which have gone on to other stages and/or become part of the company's touring show offerings. ELTC's intern and artist-in-residence programs teach students acting, playwriting, and production.

In 1996, Ohio State University asked to house the company's archives at its Jerome Lawrence and Robert E. Lee Theater Research Institute. Playbills, reviews, photographs and other memorabilia are sent to Ohio State each year.

The company was founded in North Jersey, calling the William Carlos Williams Center for the Performing Arts in Rutherford its home, until the Mid-Atlantic Center for the Arts & Humanities (MAC) asked ELTC to move its production season to Cape May, in far South Jersey. ELTC became known to MAC through its touring productions. In 1989, ELTC produced its first season in Cape May comprising four different shows, running for four weeks in the fall.

In 1998, after the death of Founding Artist Director Warren Kliewer, the Board of Trustees asked Gayle Stahlhuth to lead the company. Her background is in acting, directing, playwriting, and producing. The company has grown to 71 performances of seven different productions a season, running from mid-June through mid-December and March in Cape May.

The company is a member of the New Jersey Theatre Alliance and the South Jersey Cultural Alliance, and has received grants from the New Jersey State Council on the Arts, the Cape May County Freeholders' Fund, New Jersey Council for the Humanities, and the New Jersey Historical Commission.

The company employs members of Actors' Equity Association, mostly coming from New York City and North Jersey.

During the performing season, the company is in residence at The First Presbyterian Church of Cape May. Touring and educational outreach is throughout the year, throughout the country. The title "East Lynne" is derived from a famous American play that was seen throughout the country during the last half of the 1800s.
