= Barnegat Township School District =

School district in Ocean County, New Jersey, US

Address
- 550 Barnegat Boulevard North Barnegat Township, New Jersey, Ocean County, New Jersey, 08005
- Coordinates: 39.760005°N 74.240818°W

District information
- Grades: PreK-12
- Superintendent: Brian Latwis
- Business administrator: Stephen J. Brennan
- Schools: 6

Students and staff
- Enrollment: 3,583 (as of 2021–22)
- Faculty: 272.5 FTEs
- Student–teacher ratio: 13.1:1

Other information
- District Factor Group: CD
- Website: District website
Ind.	Per pupil	District spending	Rank (*)	K-12 average	%± vs. average
1A	Total Spending	$18,384	40	$18,891	−2.7%
1	Budgetary Cost	12,741	16	14,783	−13.8%
2	Classroom Instruction	7,770	20	8,763	−11.3%
6	Support Services	1,741	11	2,392	−27.2%
8	Administrative Cost	1,088	1	1,485	−26.7%
10	Operations & Maintenance	1,608	37	1,783	−9.8%
13	Extracurricular Activities	394	36	268	47.0%
16	Median Teacher Salary	55,083	5	64,043
Data from NJDoE 2014 Taxpayers' Guide to Education Spending. *Of K-12 districts with 1,800-3,500 students. Lowest spending=1; Highest=68

The Barnegat Township School District is a comprehensive community public school district that serves students in pre-kindergarten through twelfth grade from Barnegat Township, in Ocean County, in the U.S. state of New Jersey.

As of the 2021–22 school year, the district, comprising six schools, had an enrollment of 3,583 students and 272.5 classroom teachers (on an FTE basis), for a student–teacher ratio of 13.1:1.

The district is classified by the New Jersey Department of Education as being in District Factor Group "CD", the third-lowest of eight groupings. District Factor Groups organize districts statewide to allow comparison by common socioeconomic characteristics of the local districts. From lowest socioeconomic status to highest, the categories are A, B, CD, DE, FG, GH, I and J.

== Schools ==
Schools in the district (with 2021-22 enrollment data from the National Center for Education Statistics) are:

Elementary schools

- Lillian M. Dunfee Elementary School with 293 students in PreK
  - Jennifer Froehlich, principal
- Cecil S. Collins Elementary School with 759 students in grades K-2
  - Patrick Magee, principal
- Joseph T. Donahue Elementary School with 479 students in grades 3-4
  - Regina Santolla, principal
- Robert L. Horbelt Elementary School with 498 students in grades 5-6
  - Joseph Saxton, principal

Middle school

- Russell O. Brackman Middle School with 552 students in grades 7-8
  - Josh Toddings, principal

High school

- Barnegat High School with 971 students in grades 9-12
  - Patrick Magee, principal

Barnegat High School opened in September 2004 with a freshman class, adding a new class each subsequent year until all four grades were populated. The last group of students from Barnegat completed twelfth grade at Southern Regional High School in Stafford Township at the end of the 2006-07 school year through a now-ended sending/receiving relationship with the Southern Regional School District.

== Administration ==
Core members of the district's administration are:

- Brian Latwis, superintendent
- Stephen J. Brennan, business administrator and board secretary

== Board of education ==
The district's board of education is comprised of nine members who set policy and oversee the fiscal and educational operation of the district through its administration. As a Type II school district, the board's trustees are elected directly by voters to serve three-year terms of office on a staggered basis, with three seats up for election each year held (since 2012) as part of the November general election. The board appoints a superintendent to oversee the district's day-to-day operations and a business administrator to supervise the business functions of the district.
