= Barnegat (CDP), New Jersey =

Populated place in Ocean County, New Jersey, US

Barnegat, New Jersey
- Census-designated place
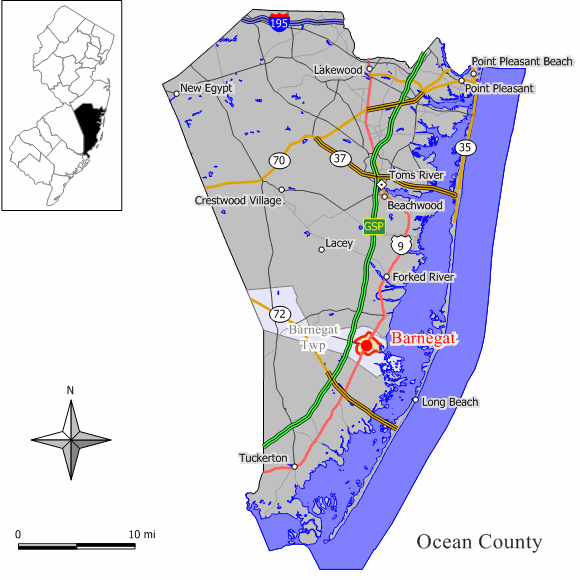
- Map of Barnegat CDP in Ocean County. Inset: Location of Ocean County in New Jersey.

- Location in Ocean County Location in New Jersey Location in the United States
- Coordinates: 39.753903°N 74.221654°W
- Country: United States
- State: New Jersey
- County: Ocean
- Township: Barnegat

Area
  - Total: 2.71 sq mi (7.02 km^{2})
  - Land: 2.70 sq mi (6.99 km^{2})
  - Water: 0.012 sq mi (0.03 km^{2}) 0.47%
- Elevation: 33 ft (10 m)

Population (2020)
  - Total: 3,894
  - Density: 1,443.6/sq mi (557.38/km^{2})
- Time zone: UTC−05:00 (Eastern (EST))
  - Summer (DST): UTC−04:00 (Eastern (EDT))
- ZIP Code: 08005
- Area code: 609
- FIPS code: 3403040
- GNIS feature ID: 2389174

Barnegat is an unincorporated community and census-designated place (CDP) located within Barnegat Township, in Ocean County, in the U.S. state of New Jersey. As of the 2010 United States census, the CDP's population was 2,817.

== Geography ==
According to the United States Census Bureau, the CDP had a total area of 2.667 square miles (6.91 km^{2}), including 2.655 square miles (6.88 km^{2}) of land and 0.012 square miles (0.031 km^{2}) of water (0.47%).

== Demographics ==
Historical population
Census	Pop.	Note	%±
1980	1,012		—
1990	1,160		14.6%
2000	1,690		45.7%
2010	2,817		66.7%
2020	3,894		38.2%
Sources: 1950 1960 1970; 1980 1990 2000; 2010

Barnegat first appeared as a census designated place in the 1980 U.S. census.

=== 2020 census ===
Barnegat CDP, New Jersey – Racial and ethnic composition Note: the US Census treats Hispanic/Latino as an ethnic category. This table excludes Latinos from the racial categories and assigns them to a separate category. Hispanics/Latinos may be of any race.
Race / Ethnicity (NH = Non-Hispanic)	Pop 2000	Pop 2010	Pop 2020	% 2000	% 2010	% 2020
White alone (NH)	1,590	6,831	2,993	94.08%	40.16%	76.86%
Black or African American alone (NH)	9	3,129	179	0.53%	18.39%	4.60%
Native American or Alaska Native alone (NH)	2	65	3	0.12%	0.38%	0.08%
Asian alone (NH)	22	3,869	67	1.30%	22.74%	1.72%
Native Hawaiian or Pacific Islander alone (NH)	0	7	2	0.00%	0.04%	0.05%
Other race alone (NH)	0	50	26	0.00%	0.29%	0.67%
Mixed race or Multiracial (NH)	21	366	159	1.24%	2.15%	4.08%
Hispanic or Latino (any race)	46	2,694	465	2.72%	15.84%	11.94%
Total	1,690	17,011	3,894	100.00%	100.00%	100.00%

=== 2010 census ===
The 2010 United States census counted 2,817 people, 1,019 households, and 733 families in the CDP. The population density was 1,061.2 people per square mile (409.7 people/km^{2}). There were 1,132 housing units at an average density of 426.4 units per square mile (164.6 units/km^{2}). The racial makeup was 92.26% (2,599) White, 2.63% (74) Black or African American, 0.00% (0) Native American, 2.24% (63) Asian, 0.04% (1) Pacific Islander, 0.85% (24) from other races, and 1.99% (56) from two or more races. Hispanic or Latino of any race were 5.79% (163) of the population.

Of the 1,019 households, 37.7% had children under the age of 18; 55.3% were married couples living together; 12.1% had a female householder with no husband present and 28.1% were non-families. Of all households, 21.0% were made up of individuals and 4.8% had someone living alone who was 65 years of age or older. The average household size was 2.76 and the average family size was 3.26.

26.9% of the population were under the age of 18, 9.7% from 18 to 24, 27.6% from 25 to 44, 27.2% from 45 to 64, and 8.7% who were 65 years of age or older. The median age was 35.8 years. For every 100 females, the population had 98.5 males. For every 100 females ages 18 and older there were 98.6 males.

=== 2000 census ===
As of the 2000 United States census there were 1,690 people, 595 households, and 443 families living in the CDP. The population density was 243.5 people/km^{2} (631 people/mi^{2}). There were 640 housing units at an average density of 92.2 units/km^{2} (239 units/mi^{2}). The racial makeup of the CDP was 95.68% White, 0.53% African American, 0.12% Native American, 1.30% Asian, 0.65% from other races, and 1.72% from two or more races. Hispanic or Latino of any race were 2.72% of the population.

There were 595 households, out of which 39.7% had children under the age of 18 living with them, 61.2% were married couples living together, 9.2% had a female householder with no husband present, and 25.5% were non-families. 18.8% of all households were made up of individuals, and 8.2% had someone living alone who was 65 years of age or older. The average household size was 2.84 and the average family size was 3.31.

In the CDP the population was spread out, with 29.2% under the age of 18, 7.3% from 18 to 24, 29.9% from 25 to 44, 24.3% from 45 to 64, and 9.3% who were 65 years of age or older. The median age was 37 years. For every 100 females, there were 105.8 males. For every 100 females age 18 and over, there were 101.5 males.

The median income for a household in the CDP was $55,040, and the median income for a family was $59,100. Males had a median income of $36,755 versus $24,500 for females. The per capita income for the CDP was $21,431. About 2.6% of families and 6.0% of the population were below the poverty line, including 6.4% of those under age 18 and 5.9% of those age 65 or over.
