= Ocean Township, Ocean County, New Jersey =

Township in Ocean County, New Jersey, US

Ocean Township, New Jersey
- Township
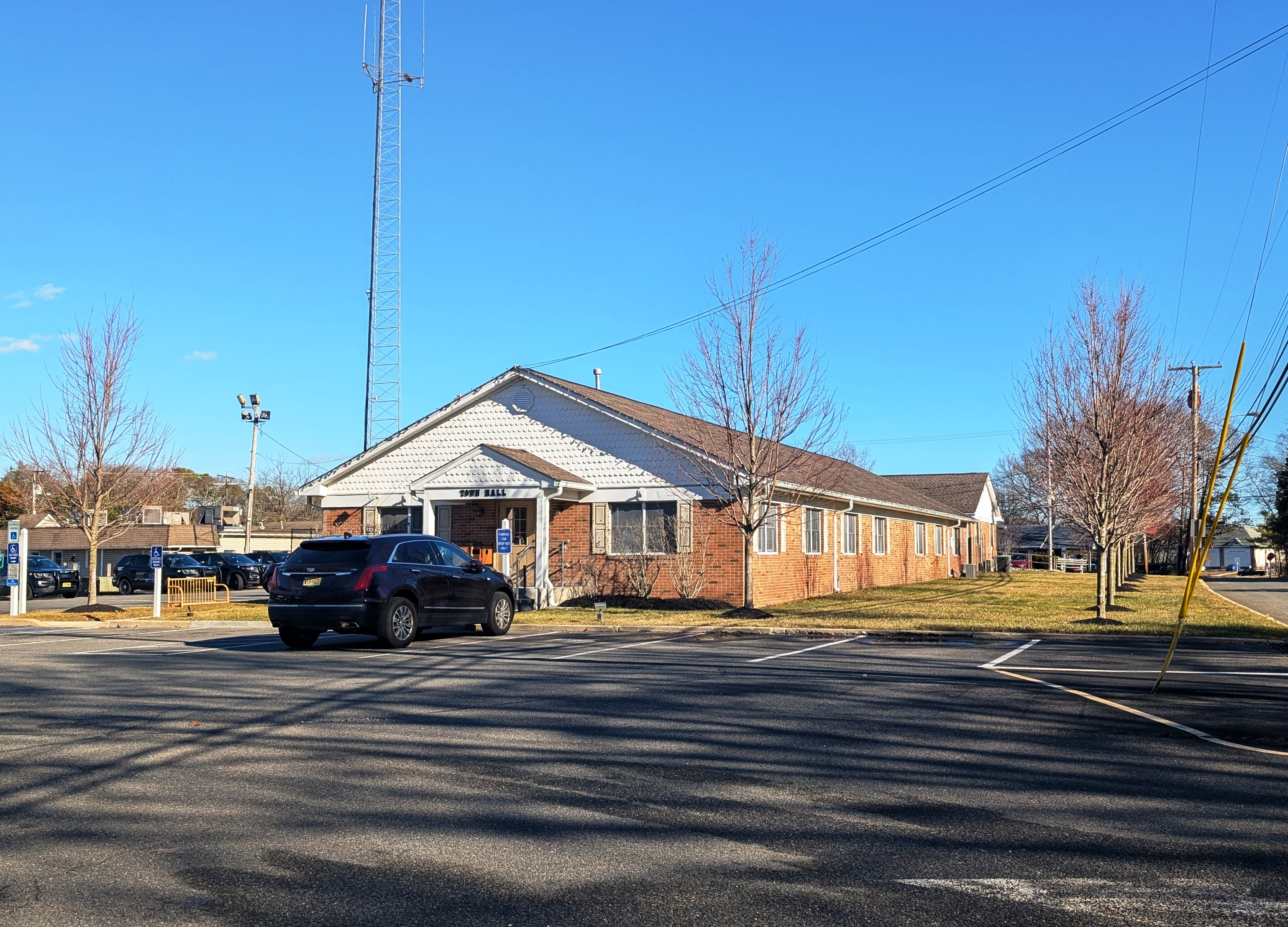
- Ocean Township Town Hall

- Seal

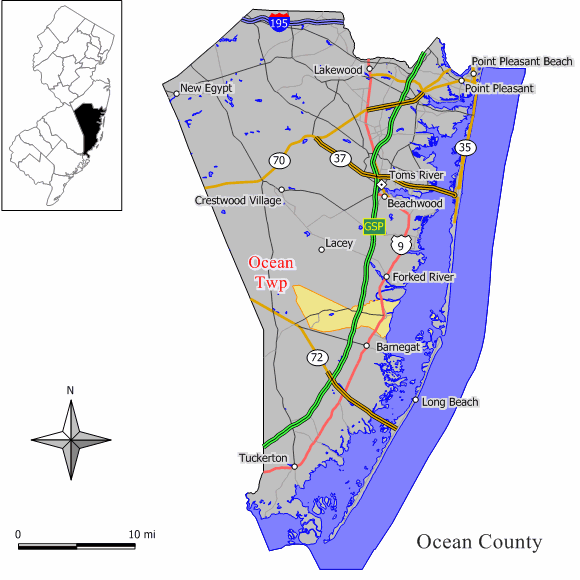
- Location of Ocean Township in Ocean County highlighted in yellow (right). Inset map: Location of Ocean County in New Jersey highlighted in black (left).

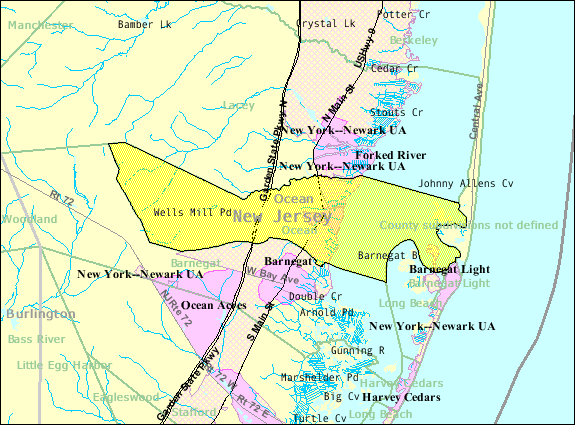
- Census Bureau map of Ocean Township, Ocean County, New Jersey

- Location in Ocean County Location in New Jersey Location in the United States
- Coordinates: 39.790729°N 74.214609°W
- Country: United States
- State: New Jersey
- County: Ocean
- Incorporated: April 13, 1876

Government
  - Type: Township
  - Body: Township Committee
  - Mayor: Ken Baulderstone (R, term ends December 31, 2026)
  - Administrator: Diane B. Ambrosio
  - Municipal clerk: Diane B. Ambrosio

Area
  - Total: 32.81 sq mi (84.97 km^{2})
  - Land: 21.10 sq mi (54.65 km^{2})
  - Water: 11.70 sq mi (30.31 km^{2}) 35.67%
  - Rank: 73rd of 565 in state 10th of 33 in county
- Elevation: 59 ft (18 m)

Population (2020)
  - Total: 8,835
  - Estimate (2023): 9,027
  - Rank: 268th of 565 in state 13th of 33 in county
  - Density: 423.4/sq mi (163.5/km^{2})
  - Rank: 453rd of 565 in state 30th of 33 in county
- Time zone: UTC−05:00 (Eastern (EST))
  - Summer (DST): UTC−04:00 (Eastern (EDT))
- ZIP Code: 08758 – Waretown
- Area code: 609 exchanges: 242, 693, 971
- FIPS code: 3402954300
- GNIS feature ID: 0882071
- Website: www.twpoceannj.gov

Ocean Township is a township located on the Jersey Shore in Ocean County, in the U.S. state of New Jersey. As of the 2020 United States census, the township's population was 8,835, its largest ever decennial count and an increase of 503 (+6.0%) from the 2010 census count of 8,332, which in turn reflected an increase of 1,882 (+29.2%) from the 6,450 counted in the 2000 census.

== History ==
Ocean Township was incorporated as a township by an act of the New Jersey Legislature on April 13, 1876, from portions of both Lacey Township and Union Township (now Barnegat Township). Portions of the township were taken to create Long Beach Township (March 23, 1899) and Island Beach (June 23, 1933; dissolved in 1965 and absorbed into Berkeley Township). The township derives its name from its seaside location.

Even though Waretown constitutes only one incorporated community within Ocean Township, many people use "Waretown" to refer to all of Ocean Township. The local custom is so widespread that it surprises some new residents that the official name is Ocean Township. Non-residents have been known to confuse Ocean Township with the Ocean Township of Monmouth County. There was a petition drive in 2006 to get a name change to Township of Waretown on the ballot but it failed to obtain enough signatures. The Waretown neighborhood is home to Albert Music Hall.

The name Waretown is derived from Abraham Weair (1683–1768), who came to the area with a colony of Rogerine Baptists (Quaker Baptists) c. 1737. When the colony left the area eleven years later, Weair, who had built a sawmill, stayed behind and became a prominent member of the community.

During the American Revolutionary War, British ships sailed into the nearby Barnegat Inlet in an attempt to protect their New York-bound supply vessels from attacks by local privateers sailing schooners and whaleboats. Another British objective was to destroy Newlin's salt works, a local supplier of a crucial commodity to the Revolutionary army, needed for food preservation and gunpowder manufacture. A massacre of local patriots occurred in October, 1782, when Captain John Bacon, loyal to the British crown, led a surprise attack on Long Beach.

During the War of 1812, the British returned to Barnegat Inlet to blockade the Jersey coast. Local privateers were caught and their schooners burned.

In the 1700s and 1800s, Waretown was a shipbuilding center. Vessels such as barques, barkentines, sloops, schooners, whaleboats and sneakboxes were constructed of white cedar native to the area. During this period, many sea captains built stately homes on bay front lots.

Around the turn of the twentieth century, Waretown fishermen sold oysters, clams and scallops to dealers such as the Fulton Fish Market in New York City. Other local industries included charcoal production, cranberry farming and "mossing," or gathering sphagnum moss for sale to florists. Local hunters supplied New York and Philadelphia with wildfowl via the railroads. Waretown became known for its hunting and fishing grounds, and celebrities like Presidents Grover Cleveland and William McKinley, baseball great Babe Ruth, and Wild West entertainer Buffalo Bill Cody came to participate in these pursuits.

During World War II, blimps cruised along the Jersey coast looking for German U-boats. Local fishermen reported periscopes of U-boats within 20 miles of the shore. As a precaution, troops were stationed in town at the Bayview Hotel on Barnegat Bay. In 1960, the landmark structure burned to the ground, nearly 70 years after its opening in 1890.

== Geography ==
According to the United States Census Bureau, the township had a total area of 32.81 square miles (84.97 km^{2}), including 21.10 square miles (54.65 km^{2}) of land and 11.70 square miles (30.31 km^{2}) of water (35.67%).

Waretown (with a 2020 Census population of 1,483) is an unincorporated community and census-designated place (CDP) located within Ocean Township.

Other unincorporated communities, localities and place names located partially or completely within the township include Brookville, Wells Mills, Pebble Beach, Barnegat Beach, Holiday Beach, Sands Point Harbor, Skippers Cove, Bay Haven and Dogtown.

The township borders the Ocean County municipalities of Barnegat Light, Barnegat Township, Berkeley Township, Lacey Township and Long Beach Township.

The township is one of 56 South Jersey municipalities that are included within the New Jersey Pinelands National Reserve, a protected natural area of unique ecology covering 1,100,000 acres (450,000 ha), that has been classified as a United States Biosphere Reserve and established by Congress in 1978 as the nation's first National Reserve. All of the township is included in either the state-designated Pinelands Area or the Pinelands National Reserve, which includes portions of Burlington County, along with areas in Atlantic, Camden, Cape May, Cumberland, Gloucester and Ocean counties.

== Demographics ==
Historical population
Census	Pop.	Note	%±
1880	484		—
1890	482		−0.4%
1900	436	*	−9.5%
1910	397		−8.9%
1920	286		−28.0%
1930	387		35.3%
1940	427	*	10.3%
1950	520		21.8%
1960	921		77.1%
1970	2,222		141.3%
1980	3,731		67.9%
1990	5,416		45.2%
2000	6,450		19.1%
2010	8,332		29.2%
2020	8,835		6.0%
2023 (est.)	9,027		2.2%
Population sources: 1880–2000; 1880–1920 1880–1890; 1890–1910 1910–1930; 1940–2000 2000; 2010 2020 * = Lost territory in previous decade.

=== 2010 census ===
The 2010 United States census counted 8,332 people, 3,483 households, and 2,557 families in the township. The population density was 405.3 inhabitants per square mile (156.5/km^{2}). There were 4,291 housing units at an average density of 208.8 per square mile (80.6/km^{2}). The racial makeup was 96.75% (8,061) White, 0.59% (49) Black or African American, 0.13% (11) Native American, 1.08% (90) Asian, 0.01% (1) Pacific Islander, 0.46% (38) from other races, and 0.98% (82) from two or more races. Hispanic or Latino of any race were 2.76% (230) of the population.

Of the 3,483 households, 20.2% had children under the age of 18; 60.8% were married couples living together; 8.3% had a female householder with no husband present and 26.6% were non-families. Of all households, 20.9% were made up of individuals and 10.0% had someone living alone who was 65 years of age or older. The average household size was 2.39 and the average family size was 2.76.

16.1% of the population were under the age of 18, 7.1% from 18 to 24, 20.0% from 25 to 44, 32.3% from 45 to 64, and 24.4% who were 65 years of age or older. The median age was 49.6 years. For every 100 females, the population had 98.7 males. For every 100 females ages 18 and older there were 96.7 males.

The Census Bureau's 2006–2010 American Community Survey showed that (in 2010 inflation-adjusted dollars) median household income was $74,736 (with a margin of error of +/− $6,360) and the median family income was $75,815 (+/− $7,572). Males had a median income of $49,189 (+/− $9,450) versus $33,250 (+/− $10,524) for females. The per capita income for the borough was $36,895 (+/− $4,315). About 0.9% of families and 4.0% of the population were below the poverty line, including 4.2% of those under age 18 and 2.2% of those age 65 or over.

=== 2000 census ===
As of the 2000 United States census there were 6,450 people, 2,446 households, and 1,743 families residing in the township. The population density was 310.1 inhabitants per square mile (119.7/km^{2}). There were 2,981 housing units at an average density of 143.3 per square mile (55.3/km^{2}). The racial makeup of the township was 97.33% White, 0.74% African American, 0.16% Native American, 0.42% Asian, 0.03% Pacific Islander, 0.36% from other races, and 0.96% from two or more races. Hispanic or Latino of any race were 3.10% of the population.

There were 2,446 households, out of which 33.4% had children under the age of 18 living with them, 57.5% were married couples living together, 9.6% had a female householder with no husband present, and 28.7% were non-families. 23.3% of all households were made up of individuals, and 10.1% had someone living alone who was 65 years of age or older. The average household size was 2.61 and the average family size was 3.08.

In the township the population was spread out, with 25.5% under the age of 18, 6.8% from 18 to 24, 30.3% from 25 to 44, 23.7% from 45 to 64, and 13.8% who were 65 years of age or older. The median age was 38 years. For every 100 females, there were 98.5 males. For every 100 females age 18 and over, there were 97.3 males.

The median income for a household in the township was $46,461, and the median income for a family was $55,379. Males had a median income of $39,149 versus $32,188 for females. The per capita income for the township was $22,830. About 5.6% of families and 7.8% of the population were below the poverty line, including 10.1% of those under age 18 and 4.6% of those age 65 or over.

== Parks and recreation ==
Park facilities in Ocean Township include:

- Waretown Lake and Recreation Area includes a swimming lake, tennis courts, children's playset, picnic tables and a covered pavilion.
- Tuomey Park includes a baseball field, basketball courts, horseshoe pits, children's playset and picnic tables.
- Crystal Bay Peninsula Park includes benches and picnic tables.
- Waretown Municipal Dock, end of Bryant Road, includes a fishing pier.
- Sands Point Park/Boat Ramp includes a fishing pier, fish cleaning facility, boat launch, trailer parking, tennis courts, children's playset and picnic tables.
- Wells Mills County Park is the largest county park, covering more than 900 acres (360 ha) of Pinelands forest managed by the Ocean County Department of Parks and Recreation. Included are 16 miles (26 km) of marked trails for hiking and biking, a freshwater lake for fishing and boating, rental canoes in season, a picnic area, playground, and the Wells Mills Nature Center with the Elizabeth Meirs Morgan Observation Deck. In the late 1800s, the Estlow family built two adjacent sawmills on the property, giving the name of the park its plural nature. The first person to dam the Oyster Creek and build a sawmill in this locale was James Wells in the late 1700s.
- Barnegat Branch Trail is an Ocean County rail trail that runs through Ocean Township along an abandoned rail corridor of the Barnegat Branch Division of the Central Railroad of New Jersey. When completed, the trail will extend 15.6 miles (25.1 km) from Barnegat to Toms River. Seven continuous miles of the trail are open from Barnegat to Lacey Township, plus several shorter segments.

== Government ==
=== Local government ===
Ocean Township is governed under the Township form of New Jersey municipal government, one of 141 municipalities (of the 564) statewide that use this form, the second-most commonly used form of government in the state. The Township Committee is comprised of three members, who are elected directly by the voters at-large in partisan elections to serve three-year terms of office on a staggered basis, with one seat coming up for election each year as part of the November general election in a three-year cycle. At an annual reorganization meeting, the Township Committee selects one of its members to serve as Mayor.

As of 2022, Township Committee members are Mayor Ben LoParo (R, term on committee and as mayor ends December 31, 2022), Deputy Mayor Kenneth Baulderstone (R, term on committee ends 2023; term as deputy mayor ends 2022) and Lydia Dodd (R, 2024).

In July 2009, local Republican party member and former Mayor Daniel Van Pelt was arrested by the Federal Bureau of Investigation as part of a statewide money laundering investigation. In May 2010, Van Pelt was convicted on federal corruption charges, and had been scheduled to be sentenced to federal prison on November 4, 2010.

=== Federal, state, and county representation ===
Ocean Township is located in the 2nd Congressional District and is part of New Jersey's 9th state legislative district.

For the 119th United States Congress, New Jersey's 2nd congressional district is represented by Jeff Van Drew (R, Dennis Township). New Jersey is represented in the United States Senate by Democrats Cory Booker (Newark, term ends 2027) and Andy Kim (Moorestown, term ends 2031).

For the 2026–2027 session, the 9th legislative district of the New Jersey Legislature is represented in the State Senate by Carmen Amato (R, Berkeley Township) and in the General Assembly by Greg Myhre (R, Stafford Township) and Brian E. Rumpf (R, Little Egg Harbor Township).

Ocean County is governed by a Board of County Commissioners composed of five members who are elected on an at-large basis in partisan elections and serving staggered three-year terms of office, with either one or two seats coming up for election each year as part of the November general election. At an annual reorganization held in the beginning of January, the board chooses a director and a deputy director from among its members. As of 2025, Ocean County's Commissioners (with party affiliation, term-end year and residence) are:

John P. Kelly (R, 2025, Eagleswood Township), Virginia E. Haines (R, 2025, Toms River), Robert Arace (R, Manchester Township, 2027) Jennifer Bacchione (R, Berkeley Township, 2027) and Frank Sadeghi (R, 2026, Toms River).

Constitutional officers elected on a countywide basis are: Clerk Scott M. Colabella (R, 2025, Barnegat Light), Sheriff Michael G. Mastronardy (R, 2025; Toms River) and Surrogate Jeffrey Moran (R, 2028, Beachwood).

=== Politics ===
Presidential Elections Results
Year	Republican	Democratic	Third Parties
2024	66.7% 4,085	31.7% 1,939	1.6% 96
2020	65.8% 4,026	32.4% 1,981	1.8% 88
2016	68.4% 3,526	28.6% 1,474	3.0% 154
2012	62.4% 2,881	36.7% 1,693	0.9% 42
2008	60.0% 2,654	37.6% 1,665	1.4% 64
2004	61.2% 2,125	37.5% 1,304	0.7% 34

As of March 2011, there were a total of 6,245 registered voters in Ocean Township, of which 1,017 (16.3%) were registered as Democrats, 2,095 (33.5%) were registered as Republicans and 3,128 (50.1%) were registered as Unaffiliated. There were 5 voters registered as Libertarians or Greens. Among the township's 2010 Census population, 75.0% (vs. 63.2% in Ocean County) were registered to vote, including 89.4% of those ages 18 and over (vs. 82.6% countywide).

Gubernatorial election results for Ocean Township
Year	Republican		Democratic		Third party(ies)	
Year	No.	%	No.	%	No.	%
2025	3,321	65.72%	1,711	33.86%	21	0.42%
2021	3,026	71.66%	1,164	27.56%	33	0.78%
2017	2,198	67.32%	999	30.60%	68	2.08%
2013	2,577	79.22%	631	19.40%	45	1.38%
2009	2,274	68.27%	841	25.25%	216	6.48%
2005	1,409	59.48%	849	35.84%	111	4.69%

In the 2013 gubernatorial election, Republican Chris Christie received 79.2% of the vote (2,577 cast), ahead of Democrat Barbara Buono with 19.4% (631 votes), and other candidates with 1.4% (45 votes), among the 3,307 ballots cast by the township's 6,555 registered voters (54 ballots were spoiled), for a turnout of 50.5%. In the 2009 gubernatorial election, Republican Chris Christie received 67.5% of the vote (2,274 ballots cast), ahead of Democrat Jon Corzine with 25.0% (841 votes), Independent Chris Daggett with 5.3% (178 votes) and other candidates with 1.1% (38 votes), among the 3,370 ballots cast by the township's 6,082 registered voters, yielding a 55.4% turnout.

United States Senate election results for Ocean Township1
Year	Republican		Democratic		Third party(ies)	
Year	No.	%	No.	%	No.	%
2024	3,771	63.90%	2,081	35.27%	49	0.83%
2018	3,054	69.47%	1,245	28.32%	97	2.21%
2012	2,754	62.17%	1,599	36.09%	77	1.74%
2006	1,520	62.73%	835	34.46%	68	2.81%

United States Senate election results for Ocean Township2
Year	Republican		Democratic		Third party(ies)	
Year	No.	%	No.	%	No.	%
2020	3,958	66.41%	1,894	31.78%	108	1.81%
2014	1,796	64.63%	933	33.57%	50	1.80%
2013	1,448	67.85%	673	31.54%	13	0.61%
2008	2,477	60.53%	1,537	37.56%	78	1.91%

== Education ==
For pre-kindergarten through sixth grade, public school students attend the Ocean Township School District. As of the 2018–19 school year, the district, comprised of two schools, had an enrollment of 510 students and 53.6 classroom teachers (on an FTE basis), for a student–teacher ratio of 9.5:1. Schools in the district (with 2018–19 enrollment data from the National Center for Education Statistics) are Waretown Elementary School with an enrollment of 309 students in Pre-K to 3rd grade and Frederic A. Priff Elementary School with 198 students in grades 4–6.

For seventh through twelfth grades, public school students attend the schools of the Southern Regional School District, which serves the five municipalities in the Long Beach Island Consolidated School District—Barnegat Light, Harvey Cedars, Long Beach Township, Ship Bottom and Surf City—along with students from Beach Haven and Stafford Township, together with the students from Ocean Township who attend as part of a sending/receiving relationship. Schools in the district (with 2018–19 enrollment data from the National Center for Education Statistics) are Southern Regional Middle School with 934 students in grades 7–8 and Southern Regional High School with 1,952 students in grades 9–12. Both schools are in the Manahawkin section of Stafford Township.

== Transportation ==
=== Roads and highways ===
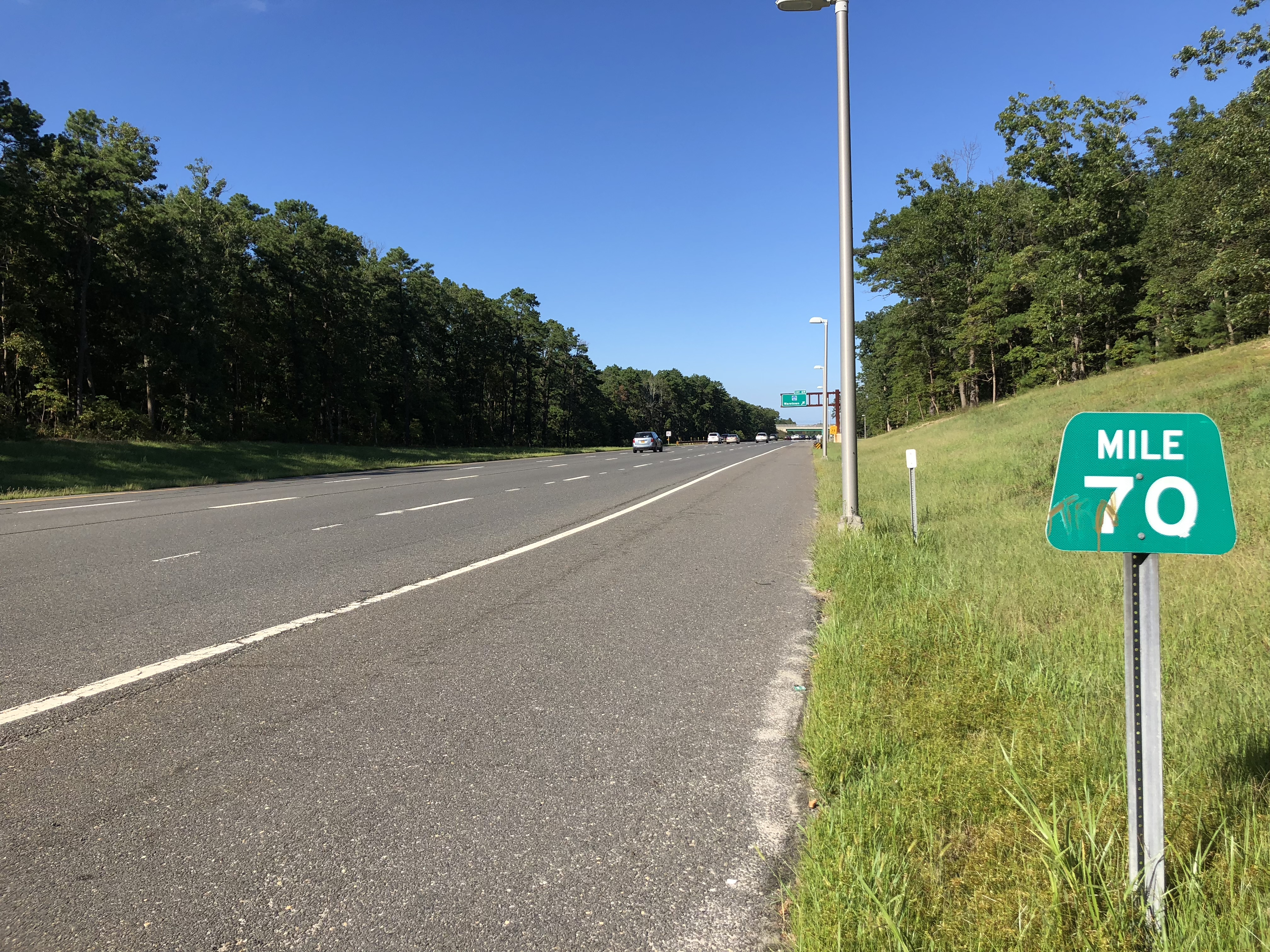
The Garden State Parkway northbound in Ocean Township

As of May 2010, the township had a total of 58.12 miles (93.54 km) of roadways, of which 36.64 miles (58.97 km) were maintained by the municipality, 16.35 miles (26.31 km) by Ocean County and 2.95 miles (4.75 km) by the New Jersey Department of Transportation and 2.18 miles (3.51 km) by the New Jersey Turnpike Authority.

The Garden State Parkway (accessible via Exit 69) and U.S. Route 9 both pass through the township, as does County Route 532. The Parkway connects Barnegat Township in the south to Lacey Township in the north and includes interchange 69 for CR 532, which is signed for Waretown / Forked River.

=== Public transportation ===
NJ Transit provides bus service to and from Atlantic City on the 559 bus route.

Ocean Ride local service is provided on the Waretown Shoppers Loop route.

== Points of Interest ==
- Albert Music Hall is located in the Waretown neighborhood. Sometimes called the "Grand Ol' Opry of the Pinelands", Albert Music Hall offers Saturday night concerts of country, bluegrass and folk music by bands from the tri-state area. The venue had its origins in the 1950s when Joseph and George Albert began hosting musical gatherings at the "Home Place," their deer lodge cabin in the Brookville section of Waretown. In 1975, the Pinelands Cultural Society was incorporated to construct a building for the preservation and promotion of the cultural history and activities of the Pinelands, including the music. Since its dedication in 1997, Albert Music Hall has hosted over 330,000 visitors. In 2000, Albert Music Hall was inducted into the American Folklore Center, Local Legacies Collection Archive in the Library of Congress, Washington, D.C.
- Lighthouse Center for Natural Resource Education, 7th Street and Navaho Drive. Located on 194 acres (79 ha) of coastal habitats adjacent to Barnegat Bay, the Lighthouse Center for Natural Resource Education has a mission of ecological leadership through education, research and interpretation. Facilities include the "Experience Barnegat Bay" trail with eight learning stations, a 250-foot (76 m) pier into Barnegat Bay, a marine station, boat house, cabins, dormitories, a lodge, dining hall, computer lab and other recreational facilities. The site is largely handicapped accessible. A foundation operates the 501(c)(3) facility under a license agreement with the New Jersey Division of Fish and Wildlife.
- The Little Red School House and Museum, which was in use between 1875 and 1958, was replicated near Waretown Lake and established as a museum. The site serves as the meeting place for the Waretown Historical Society and is open to the public 1–3 p.m. on Fridays in July and August.

== Notable people ==
People who were born in, residents of, or otherwise closely associated with Ocean Township include:

- Kenneth G. Miller (born 1956), geologist at Rutgers University
- George E. Smith (born 1930), winner of the 2009 Nobel Prize winner in Physics for his work on the charge-coupled device
- Daniel Van Pelt (born 1964), politician who served as Ocean Township's mayor and in the New Jersey General Assembly from 2008 to 2009, when he resigned after being arrested in connection with Operation Bid Rig on federal corruption charges for allegedly accepting a $10,000 bribe
- Sung J. Woo (born 1971), author
