= Waretown, New Jersey =

Populated place in Ocean County, New Jersey, US

- Census-designated place
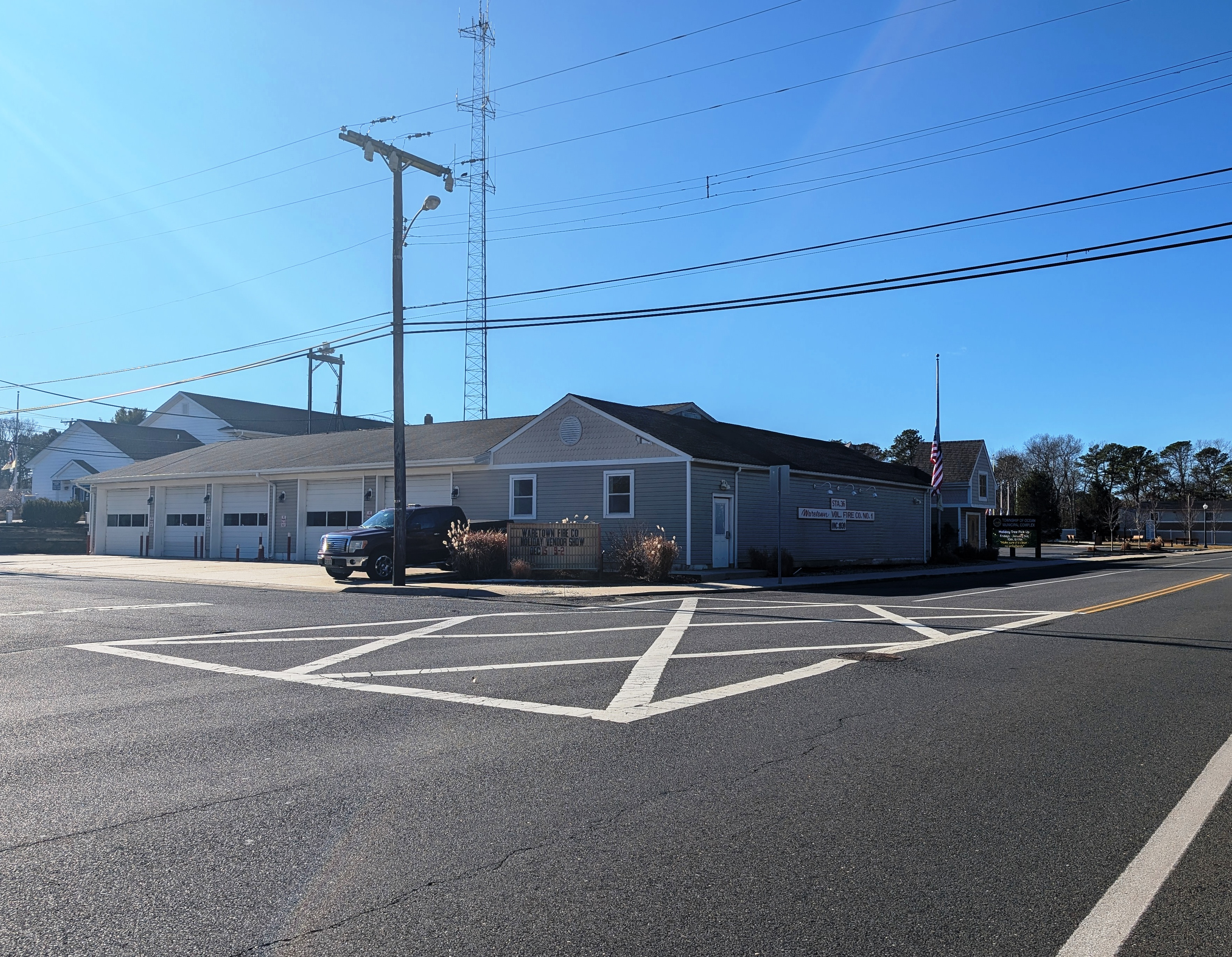
- Waretown Fire Department

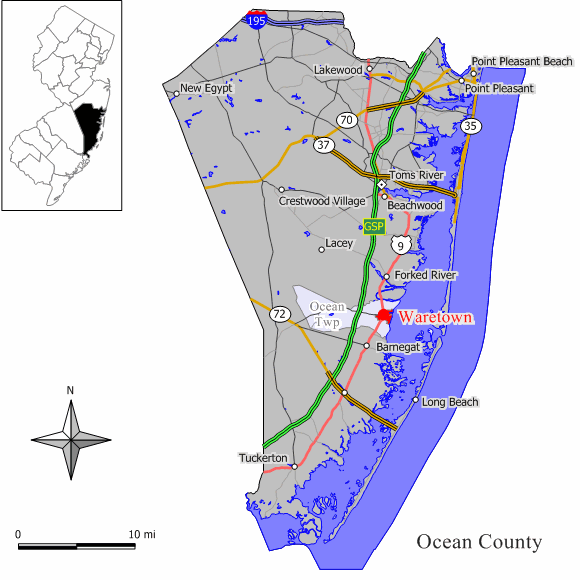
- Location of Waretown in Ocean County highlighted in red (right). Inset map: Location of Ocean County in New Jersey highlighted in black (left).

- Location in Ocean County Location in New Jersey Location in the United States
- Coordinates: 39.789812°N 74.19327°W
- Country: United States
- State: New Jersey
- County: Ocean
- Township: Ocean

Area
  - Total: 0.95 sq mi (2.46 km^{2})
  - Land: 0.92 sq mi (2.39 km^{2})
  - Water: 0.023 sq mi (0.06 km^{2}) 2.81%
- Elevation: 9.8 ft (3 m)

Population (2020)
  - Total: 1,483
  - Density: 1,605/sq mi (619.6/km^{2})
- Time zone: UTC−05:00 (Eastern (EST))
  - Summer (DST): UTC−04:00 (Eastern (EDT))
- ZIP Code: 08758
- Area code: 609
- FIPS code: 34-76820
- GNIS feature ID: 02390452

Waretown is an unincorporated community and census-designated place (CDP) located on the Jersey Shore within Ocean Township, in Ocean County, in the U.S. state of New Jersey. As of the 2020 United States census, the CDP's population was 1,483, a decrease of 86 (5.5%) from the 1,589 recorded at the 2010 United States census, which in turn had decreased by 13 (-0.8%) from the 1,582 counted at the 2000 census. Waretown is home to Albert Music Hall, an event venue.

== Geography ==
According to the United States Census Bureau, the CDP had a total area of 0.925 square miles (2.40 km^{2}), including 0.899 square miles (2.33 km^{2}) of land and 0.026 square miles (0.067 km^{2}) of water (2.81%).

== Demographics ==
Historical population
Census	Pop.	Note	%±
1980	1,175		—
1990	1,283		9.2%
2000	1,582		23.3%
2010	1,569		−0.8%
2020	1,483		−5.5%
Population sources: 1950 1960 1970; 1980 1990 2000; 2010 2020

Waretown first appeared as a census designated place in the 1980 U.S. census.

=== 2010 census ===
The 2010 United States census counted 1,569 people, 644 households, and 458 families in the CDP. The population density was 1,745.9 people per square mile (674.1 people/km^{2}). There were 836 housing units at an average density of 930.2 units per square mile (359.2 units/km^{2}). The racial makeup was 97.77% (1,534) White, 0.45% (7) Black or African American, 0.00% (0) Native American, 0.51% (8) Asian, 0.06% (1) Pacific Islander, 0.25% (4) from other races, and 0.96% (15) from two or more races. Hispanic or Latino of any race were 2.36% (37) of the population.

Of the 644 households, 23.3% had children under the age of 18; 56.2% were married couples living together; 10.1% had a female householder with no husband present and 28.9% were non-families. Of all households, 23.0% were made up of individuals and 11.2% had someone living alone who was 65 years of age or older. The average household size was 2.44 and the average family size was 2.89.

17.7% of the population were under the age of 18, 8.5% from 18 to 24, 23.1% from 25 to 44, 31.1% from 45 to 64, and 19.6% who were 65 years of age or older. The median age was 45.4 years. For every 100 females, the population had 98.9 males. For every 100 females ages 18 and older there were 96.8 males.

The Census Bureau's 2006-2010 American Community Survey showed that (in 2010 inflation-adjusted dollars) median household income was $78,750 (with a margin of error of +/- $4,931) and the median family income was $85,043 (+/- $13,392). Males had a median income of $53,438 (+/- $21,536) versus $31,172 (+/- $19,721) for females. The per capita income for the borough was $45,330 (+/- $18,923). About none of families and 4.4% of the population were below the poverty line, including 4.7% of those under age 18 and none of those age 65 or over.

=== 2000 Census ===
As of the 2000 United States census there were 1,582 people, 641 households, and 439 families living in the CDP. The population density was 656.8 people/km^{2} (1,701 people/mi^{2}). There were 791 housing units at an average density of 328.4 units/km^{2} (851 units/mi^{2}). The racial makeup of the CDP was 97.79% White, 0.44% African American, 0.06% Native American, 0.32% Asian, 0.06% from other races, and 1.33% from two or more races. Hispanic or Latino of any race were 2.28% of the population.

There were 641 households, out of which 28.1% had children under the age of 18 living with them, 54.4% were married couples living together, 9.2% had a female householder with no husband present, and 31.5% were non-families. 26.4% of all households were made up of individuals, and 13.1% had someone living alone who was 65 years of age or older. The average household size was 2.47 and the average family size was 2.98.

In the CDP the population was spread out, with 22.2% under the age of 18, 7.1% from 18 to 24, 29.1% from 25 to 44, 25.4% from 45 to 64, and 16.2% who were 65 years of age or older. The median age was 40 years. For every 100 females, there were 97.0 males. For every 100 females age 18 and over, there were 96.6 males.

The median income for a household in the CDP was $44,410, and the median income for a family was $56,429. Males had a median income of $35,547 versus $26,667 for females. The per capita income for the CDP was $22,061. About 1.7% of families and 5.6% of the population were below the poverty line, including 5.1% of those under age 18 and 8.2% of those age 65 or over.

== Transportation ==
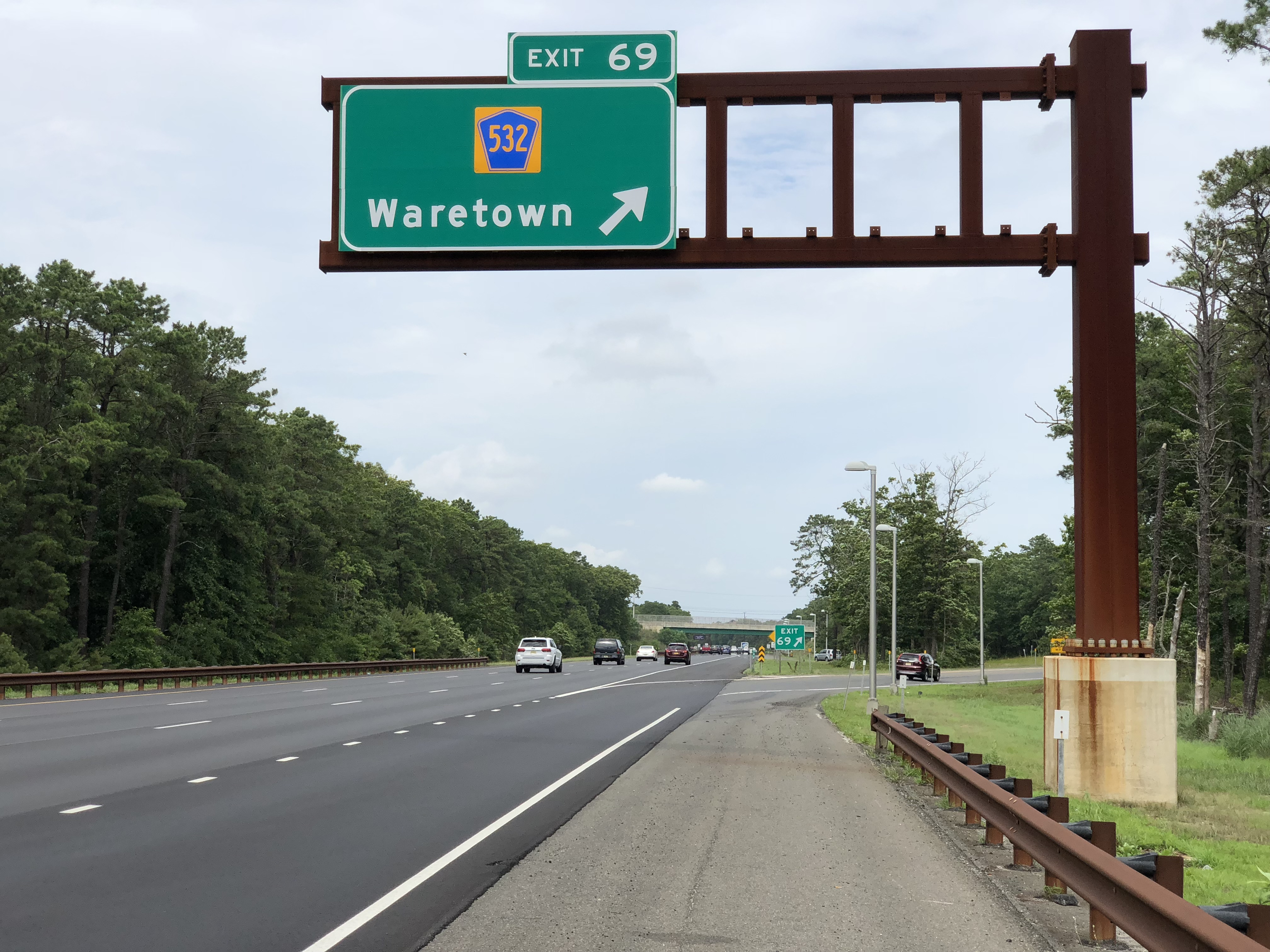
The Garden State Parkway northbound at the exit for Waretown

New Jersey Transit provides bus service to Atlantic City on the 559 bus route. Numbered routes that run through the community include U.S. Route 9 and County Route 532. Waretown is served by exit 69 of the Garden State Parkway.

== Notable people ==
People who were born in, residents of, or otherwise closely associated with Waretown include:

- George E. Smith (1930-2025), winner of the 2009 Nobel Prize winner in Physics for his work on the charge-coupled device.
