= Batona Trail =

Long-distance hiking trail in the United States

Coordinates: 39.621°N 74.543°W

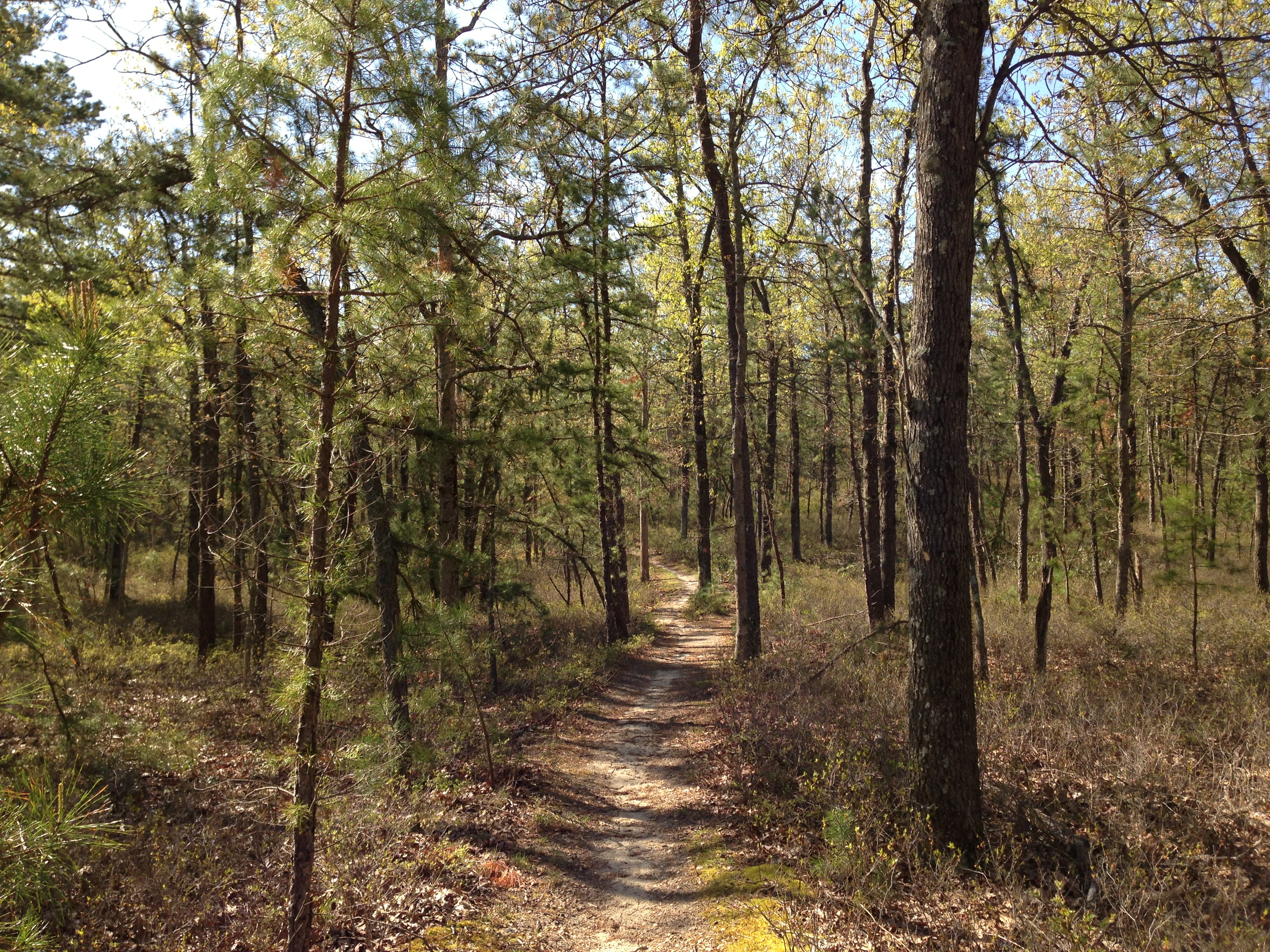
- Typical section of the Batona Trail in Brendan T. Byrne State Forest
- Length: approx. 53.5 mi (86.1 km)
- Location: New Jersey Pine Barrens, Burlington County, New Jersey
- Trailheads: Leektown, Bass River; Ong's Hat, Pemberton
- Use: Hiking
- Elevation change: 196 ft (60 m)
- Highest point: Apple Pie Hill
- Lowest point: Harrisville
- Difficulty: Easy
- Season: Early to mid-spring, fall, winter
- Sights: Batsto Village; Carranza Memorial; Apple Pie Hill
- Hazards: Severe weather Tick-borne diseases Mosquitos; Limited water Poison ivy Venomous snakes

The Batona Trail is a 53.5-mile (86.1 km) hiking trail through New Jersey's Pine Barrens. The trail is one of the longest in the state, behind the Delaware and Raritan Canal Trail, the section of the Appalachian Trail within the state, the Liberty-Water Gap Trail, and the completed section of the Highlands Trail in the state. The Batona Trail begins in Brendan T. Byrne State Forest (formerly Lebanon State Forest) at the ghost town of Ong's Hat and traverses Franklin Parker Preserve, Wharton State Forest and Bass River State Forest. The trail was built in 1961 by the Batona Hiking Club, which began informally in 1928 when Philadelphians began meeting regularly to hike. It takes about three days to hike the whole trail.

== History ==
In 1960, Dale Knapschafer suggested a trail be built linking Wharton and Lebanon State Forests. The next year, Batona Hiking Club (Batona being a condensed form of the phrase, "BAck TO NAture") president Morris Bardock contacted the Department of Conservation and Economic Development in New Jersey for permission to construct such a trail. After receiving permission from the state, Morris Bardock and Walter Korszniak made exploratory trips to figure out a route in the winter and spring of 1961 for the future trail. Through the help of volunteers, the first 30 miles (48 km) of the trail was completed over the summer, and the final pink blaze was painted on a tree near New Jersey Route 70 in Lebanon State Forest on September 16, 1961. Bardock chose pink blazes for the Batona Trail. The trail originally connected Carpenter Spring in Lebanon State Forest (now Brendan T. Byrne State Forest) and Batsto Village in Wharton State Forest. At this time Batsto (batstu meaning "bath place" in Swedish) was being developed by the state and continued to be inhabited by a few people. More recently, the trail has been extended.

In 2012, the trail was rerouted in two areas. The first was in Bass River State Forest, which is the southernmost part of the trail. The second area is around Chatsworth. Both of the rerouted sections go through quieter areas and bypass paved roads and power lines where the trail originally ran. The Chatsworth section puts the trail through the northern section of the Franklin Parker Preserve. Both of these reroutes have added about 2 miles (3 km) to the overall trail length.

== Flora and fauna ==
Although the Pine Barrens, as the name suggests, are mainly flat pine forests, there is a large variety of plants and animals along the trail. The pines include, primarily, pitch pine (Pinus rigida), and shortleaf pine (Pinus echinata). White pine (Pinus strobus) and loblolly pine (Pinus taeda) typically occur only where deliberately planted, and Virginia pine (Pinus virginiana) is sporadic, usually in atypical areas. The most common vegetation community type in uplands is Pine/Oak Forest, composed of the typical pines and various oaks (Quercus spp.), with an understory of ericaceous shrubs, mainly huckleberries (Gaylussacia spp.). The wetlands are typically stood of Atlantic white cedar (Chamaecyparis thyoides), or mixed hardwood swamps mainly composed of red maple (Acer rubrum), black gum (Nyssa sylvatica), gray birch (Betula populifolia), swamp magnolia (Magnolia virginiana), and highbush blueberry (Vaccinium corymbosum). Another very common wetland forest is the Pitch Pine Lowland, which is dominated by pitch pine, but may include a wide variety of other wetland species. Another common tree seen along the trail is the sassafras (Sassafras albidum).

There are a number of wild edibles, such as berries from bearberry (Arctostaphylos uva-ursi), teaberry (Gaultheria procumbens), huckleberry (Gaylussacia spp.), blackberry (Rubus spp.), cranberry (Vaccinium macrocarpon), and blueberry (Vaccinium spp.); young shoots from briers (Smilax spp.); and acorns from oaks. There is a diverse range of other plants, including a wide variety of shrubs, grasses, sedges, rushes, ferns, mosses, and herbaceous wildflowers. Notable plants that may be seen along the trail include wild orchids; carnivorous plants such as the sundews (Drosera spp.), the pitcher plant (Sarracenia purpurea), and the bladderworts (Utricularia spp.); and the prickly pear cactus (Opuntia humifusa).

39 species of mammals, 229 bird species, 59 reptile and amphibian species, and 91 fish species have been reported within the broad area of the Pinelands National Reserve. The number of native species, however, found in truly characteristic Pine Barrens, is much lower. Possums, chipmunks, squirrels, beavers, muskrats, mice, foxes, raccoons, weasels, mink, river otters, and white-tailed deer are some of the more common mammals seen in the Pinelands. Commonly seen amphibians include the green frog, leopard frog, carpenter frog, and the Fowler's toad. Common reptiles include the northern water snake, pine snake, hognose snake, eastern garter snake, northern fence lizard, eastern painted turtle, red-bellied turtle, spotted turtle, musk turtle, and snapping turtle. The only venomous snake in the New Jersey Pine Barrens is the timber rattlesnake, which is a state-listed endangered species. The Pine Barrens tree frog, a state-listed threatened species, has a population here that is disconnected from other populations in the Carolinas and the Florida Panhandle.

The Pine Barrens location makes it the fringe of both northern and southern species, such as the yellow fringed orchid.

== Events ==
The Annual Fall Endurance Run/Walk on the Batona Trail is generally held the first weekend in November.

=== Batona Trail Races ===
An annual ultramarathon event has been held running varying distances of the Batona Trail since 2014. What originally started as a "fat ass" style (no entry fee) event became more structured in 2019 when Beast Coast Productions, LLC, began managing the event.

== Brendan T. Byrne State Forest ==
Byrne State Forest (formerly Lebanon State Forest) has more than 25 miles (40 km) of blazed trails, including its section of the Batona Trail. The system of trails includes trails for hiking, cross-country skiing, snowshoeing, mountain biking, and wheelchair-accessible trails. The Batona Trail in this park permits hiking, cross-country skiing, and snowshoeing. The Batona Trail intersects with other trails in the park, allowing visitors to create various loops for day hikes. The Batona Trail through Byrne State Forest is maintained by the State Park Service and the Batona Hiking Club.

== Wharton State Forest ==
The portion of the Batona Trail through Wharton State Forest is maintained by the State Park Service and the Batona (BAck TO NAture) Hiking Club.

=== Carranza Memorial ===
The Batona Trail passes the Carranza Memorial within Wharton State Forest. There is a 12-foot-high (3.7 m) monument dedicated to Captain Aviator Emilio Carranza, whose plane crashed here on July 13, 1928. Carranza was born in Mexico in 1905 and began flying at a young age, after fighting against the Yaqui in the Yaqui rebellion. At age 22, he made the third longest non-stop flight. Carranza crashed in the pinelands of Tabernacle, New Jersey, along what is now known as Carranza Road while returning from a goodwill flight to the United States from Mexico. Every year a ceremony is held on July 13 to remember Emilio Carranza's life and achievements.

=== Apple Pie Hill ===
Apple Pie Hill is the highest point along the trail at 205 feet (62 m) above sea level. The hill sports a 60-foot (18 m) fire tower at the summit, providing impressive panoramic views across the region and making it a popular destination.

== Bass River State Forest ==
There is a system of eight additional trails in the state forest that connect to the Batona Trail. The Batona Trail through Bass River State Forest is maintained by the State Park Service, the Outdoor Club of South Jersey and the Batona Hiking Club.
