= Blue Comet =

Express train

The Blue Comet
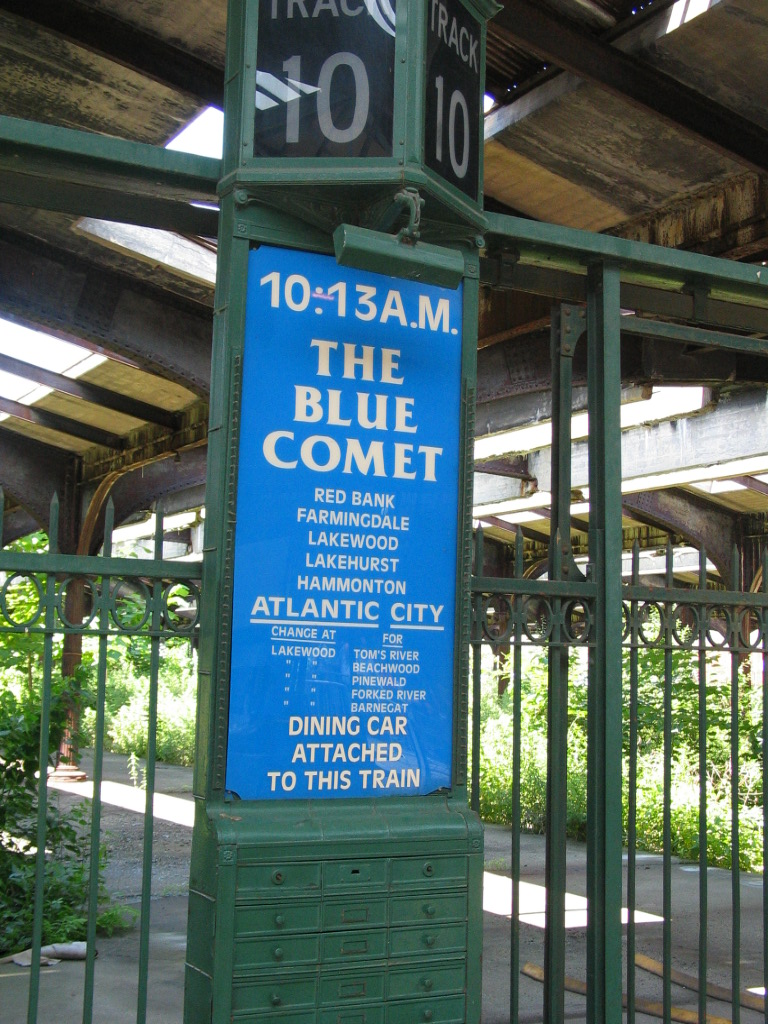
- A reproduced sign for the former Blue Comet service at Communipaw Terminal in Jersey City

Overview
- Service type: Inter-city rail
- Status: Discontinued
- Locale: New Jersey, United States
- First service: February 21, 1929
- Last service: September 27, 1941
- Former operator: Central Railroad of New Jersey

Route
- Termini: Jersey City, New Jersey; Atlantic City, New Jersey
- Distance travelled: 136.3 miles (219.4 km)
- Average journey time: 3 hours
- Service frequency: varied

On-board services
- Seating arrangements: Reserved coach seat
- Catering facilities: Dining car
- Observation facilities: Observation car

Technical
- Track gauge: 1,435 mm (4 ft 8 1/2 in)

A map of the New Jersey Southern Railroad and its connections

The Blue Comet was a named passenger train operated by Central Railroad of New Jersey (CNJ) from 1929 to 1941 between the New York metropolitan area and Atlantic City.

Designed by CNJ president R.B. White in 1928, this train whisked passengers from Communipaw Terminal in Jersey City to Atlantic City, making the total trip from Manhattan (via ferry to the Jersey City terminal) to Atlantic City in three hours. The Blue Comet would travel via the CNJ-co-owned New York and Long Branch Railroad to Red Bank, then follow the CNJ Southern Division Main Line to Winslow Junction, where it would travel over the Atlantic City Railroad's tracks to Atlantic City.

The colors chosen for the Blue Comet's locomotive and passenger cars were ultramarine and Packard Blue, for the sea, cream, for the sandy coastal beaches, and nickel. The tickets for the train were blue, the dining car chairs were upholstered in blue linen and the porters were dressed in blue as well. The locomotive was capable of 100 miles per hour, and the railroad claimed the train itself was the first east of the Mississippi to be equipped with roller bearings for easy starting and stopping.

== History ==
Inaugurated on February 21, 1929, the Blue Comet was designed to provide coach passengers with deluxe equipment, accommodations and service at a regular coach fare. The first revenue passengers to board the CNJ's new flagship at Communipaw Terminal were Miss Beatrice Winter and Miss Helen Lewis of New York. As the Blue Comet made its way to Atlantic City, it was put on display for patrons, railfans, and local residents to see and inspect.

Thousands of spectators along the line came to see the new train. This was due in part to a clever ad campaign via radio and newspaper which spurred public interest. Following its first arrival in Atlantic City, a formal dinner was held for railroad officials at the Hotel Dennis. The Blue Comet was published in several periodicals and trade magazines such as Railway Age (March 1929), Fortune (the first issue in February 1930), The Modelmaker, and several advertisements for ELESCO superheaters and feedwater heaters. Periodic articles about the train appeared in The New York Times, The Philadelphia Inquirer, and local papers such as the Red Bank Register.

It was featured in a British 1937 Gallaher Ltd. collection of tobacco cards entitled "Trains of the World". Billed as the "Seashore's Finest Train", it was dubbed a "Symphony in Blue". Lionel Trains founder Joshua Lionel Cowen was among those who frequently rode the Blue Comet. Inspired by the train's elegant beauty, speed and the sublime power of its towering locomotive, Lionel offered a standard gauge model of the train in 1930. This gave the train and Lionel an almost mythical quality.

There were three factors behind the creation of the Blue Comet:

- To eliminate passenger service south of Winslow Junction and replace rail service with bus connections
- To better compete with the Pennsylvania Railroad (PRR) for Atlantic City passengers
- To eliminate a costly Pullman parlor car lease, from which the CNJ took a loss ten months of the year

The Blue Comet offered extra accommodations at the regular coach fare and assigned seats so passengers knew exactly where they would sit. The PRR charged extra for its all-parlor car Atlantic City Limited and the New York Limited. In addition, the railroad charged extra fees for parlor cars on the Nellie Bly. The Blue Comet ran on-schedule 97 percent of the time for its first five years. A billboard was installed on Routes 33 and 34 overpass at Farmingdale listing the times the train would pass that area.

The Blue Comet was initially a success but fell victim to the Great Depression. Service was reduced to a single daily round-trip by April 1933. Also, that year, the PRR and the Reading Company consolidated their southern New Jersey routes and formed the Pennsylvania-Reading Seashore Lines. After the merger, the PRR owned two-thirds of the trackage. Reports from travelers indicate that Blue Comet information was not readily available at the Atlantic City station. This had the Blue Comet service at a disadvantage, as PRR Atlantic City-New York information was readily available for passengers heading to points north.

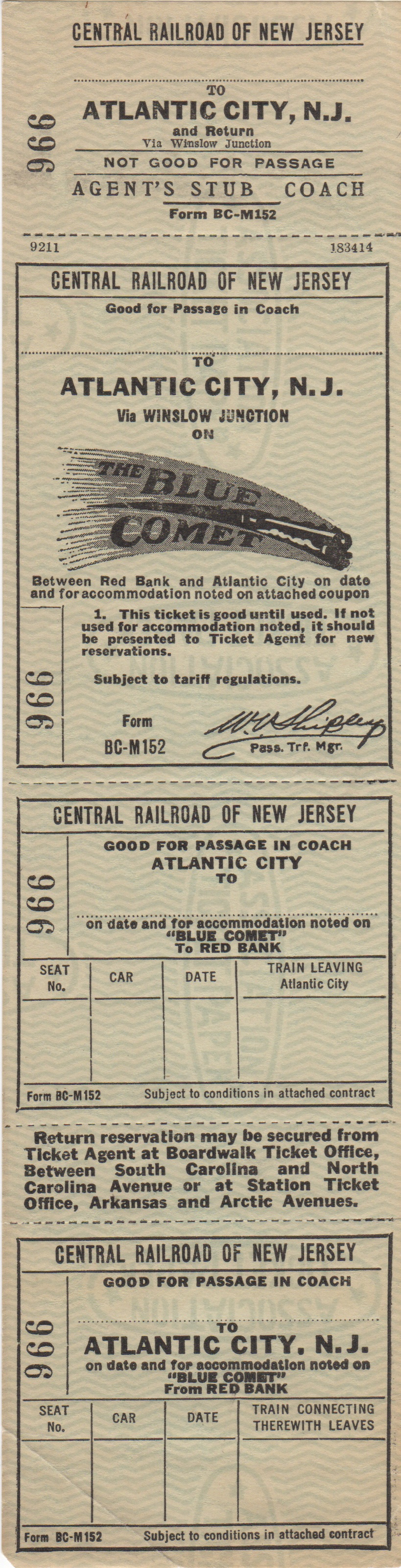
An original unused ticket for the Blue Comet

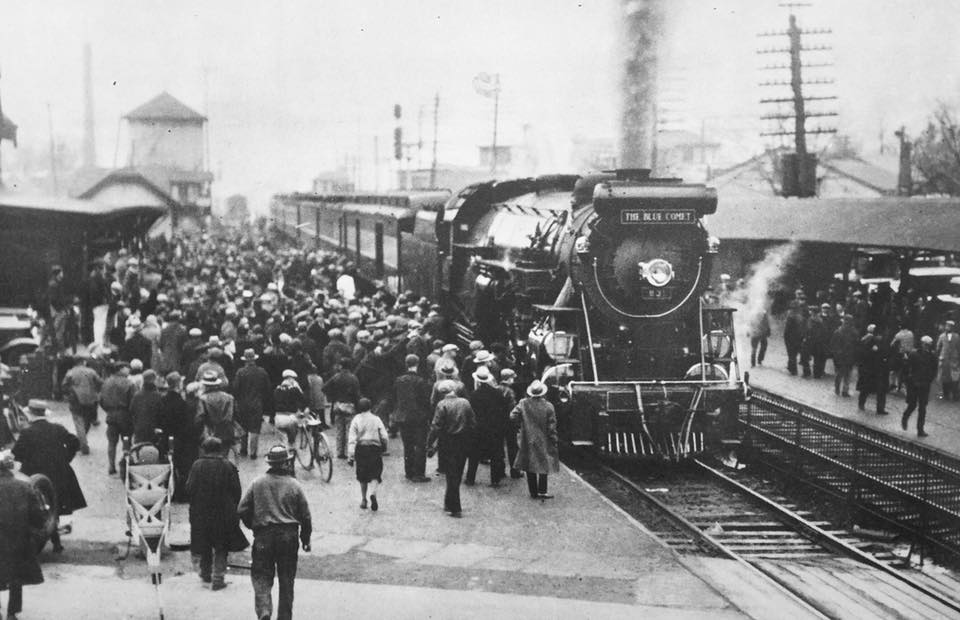
The debut of the Blue Comet at Red Bank station on February 17, 1929

Ocean County stops for the Blue Comet included Lakewood and Lakehurst. The Lakewood stop was to pick up and drop off passengers as well as Jolly Tar Trail bus service. The stop at Lakehurst was for people needing a connection for the Barnegat Branch, later replaced by Jolly Tar Trail service during off-peak hours in the early 1930s and for the locomotives to take on water. By the mid-1930s, service had picked up to a morning and an afternoon train in the southerly direction and an afternoon and an evening train in the northerly in summer 1936.

For residents of the more isolated sections of the Pine Barrens, the Blue Comet's railroad crews dropped off newspapers. In Chatsworth, the train slowed as it went through the center of town on its return from Atlantic City to disperse a bundle of the daily papers, including The New York Times, The Philadelphia Inquirer, among other big-city publications, which had been provided for passengers to read while on board. This goodwill gesture offered a way for locals who did not have radios or electricity to stay informed on current events. Community lore has it that residents would show their appreciation by bringing baskets of freshly picked berries for the crew. However, this anecdote has been disputed by some who lived in the area at the time and insisted the express train did not stop in a location where such an exchange would have happened.

The schedule for the Blue Comet in June 1936

The Blue Comet made its final run on September 27, 1941, due to a decline in passenger travel and facing increased competition with the PRR.

== Accidents ==
On Friday, December 26, 1935, the Blue Comet experienced a small fire in the roof of the dining car Giacobini. The fire was discovered while the train was en route to Red Bank by the chef, who promptly alerted the steward Lewis Herring. The two men attempted to put out the fire themselves using fire extinguishers; however, the origin of the fire was inaccessible. An overheated flue from the coal stove had caused some of the roof structure to burn between the ceiling and the roof of the dining car.

Red Bank firefighters were summoned as the train pulled into the station and the fire was quickly put out. Damage was estimated at only $50.00. The passengers were unaware that there was any problem until they were politely asked to leave the dining car at the station. The Blue Comet was delayed for 39 minutes while the fire was put out and the dining car removed from service. The train arrived in Atlantic City only 22 minutes behind schedule.

On August 19, 1939, train No. 4218 was traveling eastbound with a consist of a combine Halley, a coach D'Arrest, a diner Giacobini, a second coach Winnecki and an observation car Biela. Engine No. 820, a 4-6-2 Pacific, was on point. Conductor Walsh and engineman Thomas was in charge of the train, which was carrying 49 passengers and crew. Extraordinarily heavy rains fell in the area throughout the day. It is estimated that roughly 13 1/2 inches of rain fell, and about 10 3/4 inches fell between 2 and 6 p.m.

The Blue Comet's crew had reduced speed from the usual 70 mph to between 35–40 mph, as visibility was poor and the crew had been given a message at Winslow Junction to keep a lookout for sand on the crossings due to the heavy rains. Near milepost 86, about a mile west of Chatsworth station, the train hit a washout at 4:37 pm. The surface water had overwhelmed two 24-inch culverts and undermined the roadbed. The locomotive and tender made it across the damaged track, with the rear tender truck being derailed. The rear truck floating lever was damaged, rendering the tender brakes inoperative. The entire five-car consist had become uncoupled from the tender and derailed.

The cars came to rest in general line with the track and were leaning at various angles. Roughly 500 feet of track was destroyed. When the train failed to arrive at Chatsworth Station, personnel and local residents waded over a mile through the woods in water waist deep in parts to reach the wreck. Reports that 100 people were killed led to a flurry of ambulances from northern parts of the state. Actually, only 49 people were on board. The injured included 32 passengers, four dining car employees, a porter and a train service employee. The chef, Joseph Coleman, was crushed and badly scalded in the kitchen of the dining car when the stove fell on top of him as the car overturned. He later died from his injuries.

The majority of the injuries were minor, resulting from the flying wicker chairs in the observation car. The CNJ crews replaced about 600 feet of damaged track in approximately 48 hours. A relief train arrived a few hours later to transport the remaining passengers. An investigation concluded that the derailment was caused by the washout, which resulted from the unusually heavy rainfall. Today, the mainline track and wreck site are abandoned and very overgrown.

All of the Blue Comet equipment involved in the wreck was repaired and returned to service, except for the dining car Giacobini (which was also involved in the 1935 fire). Being a steel-clad wooden car, it was unable to withstand the forces of the wreck and was too badly damaged to repair. It was used as a rail yard freight office until it was eventually scrapped.

=== Crossing accidents ===
On Friday, January 10, 1936, William Taylor, 42, a farmhand, was instantly killed when his produce truck was struck by the Blue Comet while crossing the tracks at Finkel's Lane, Shrewsbury. Mr. Taylor was employed on the farm owned by C. Borderson of Shrewsbury and had been transporting produce from one side of the farm to the other. The crossing was on private property and had no watchman. The engineer, William J. Smith of Elizabeth, was taken into custody for questioning and later released.

Engineer Smith stated that the bell of the Blue Comet had been kept ringing ever since the train pulled out of the Red Bank station. He said the whistle had been sounded. The truck was demolished and the locomotive badly damaged. A steam valve cap from the automatic safety control of the engine was damaged and the steam escaped. After a delay of about an hour, the train limped into Eatontown station, where an extra locomotive from Red Bank took up the interrupted journey.

Shortly before noon on January 14, 1936, a National Biscuit Company trailer-truck stalled on the tracks of the New York & Long Branch railroad at the Shrewsbury Avenue crossing and was struck by a southbound Pennsylvania train. The driver, Joseph Clark, 53, of Corona, Long Island, jumped from the cab of the truck before the train crashed into it. According to the driver, the motor of the truck stalled just as it reached the tracks. A wrecking crew removed the truck from the tracks so as to permit the Blue Comet, due at Red Bank at 10:04 o'clock, to pass.

At 6:10 p.m. on Monday, September 8, 1941, a mother and two of her children were killed when the Blue Comet crashed into a light delivery truck at an unprotected crossing not far from their home. They were Antionette Macciocca, of White Horse Pike Elm, and her two daughters, 13-year-old Gloria, and Joanne, who was four years old. The accident took place as Mocciocca was driving back to her home after visiting a neighbor to obtain advice on canning vegetables.

The crash occurred a few minutes after the Blue Comet left Hammonton, bound for Jersey City. The state police said the crossing was marked with a sign but was without a watchman, crossing bells or signal lights. The train stopped several hundred yards up the tracks after the incident and was delayed for an hour. The crew included A. Feryling as the locomotive's engineer, and J.F. Walsh as the conductor.

== Equipment ==
Blue Comet
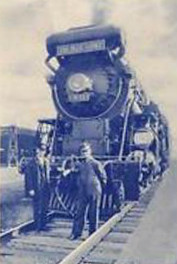
- The Blue Comet locomotive and its crew in September 1929
Type and origin
- Power type: Steam
- Builder: Baldwin Locomotive Works
- Build date: 1928
- Total produced: 3
Specifications
- Configuration
  - Whyte: 4-6-2 Pacific
- Gauge: 4 ft 8 1/2 in (1,435 mm) standard gauge
- Leading dia.: 36 in (910 mm)
- Driver dia.: 79 in (2,000 mm)
- Trailing dia.: 55 in (1,400 mm)
- Wheelbase: 72 ft 2 in (22.00 m)
  - Drivers: 13 ft 10 in (4.22 m)
- Height: 15 ft 7/8 in (4.594 m)
- Frame type: cast vanadium steel
- Axle load
  - Leading: 65,850 lb (29.87 t)
  - Trailing: 62,960 lb (28.56 t)
- Adhesive weight: 197,660 lb (89.66 t)
- Loco weight: 326,470 lb (148.08 t)
- Tender weight: 217,000 lb (98 t)
- Total weight: 543,470 lb (246.51 t)
- Tender type: Commonwealth one-piece cast steel water bottom underframe
- Fuel type: bituminous coal
- Fuel capacity: 15 short tons (13.6 t)
- Water cap.: 10,000 US gal (37,850 L)
- Firebox
  - Grate area: 84.3 ft^{2} (7.83 m^{2}) (126.125 in (3.2 m) × 97.25 in (2.5 m))
- Boiler
  - Diameter: first ring: 78 in (2.0 m)
  - Tube plates: 228 in (5.8 m)
  - Small tubes: 251 × 2 in (51 mm) flues
  - Large tubes: 36 × 5.375 in (136.5 mm) flues
- Boiler pressure: 230 psi (1,600 kPa)
- Feedwater heater: Elesco
- Heating surface: 4,647 ft^{2} (431.7 m^{2})
- Superheater
  - Type: Type "A"
  - Heating area: 36 heating elements
- Cylinders: 2
- Cylinder size: 26 in × 28 in (660 mm × 710 mm)
- Valve gear: Walschaerts
- Valve type: 13 in (330 mm) piston valves
Performance figures
- Tractive effort: 46,841 lbf (208.36 kN)
- Factor of adh.: 4.21
Career
- Operators: Central Railroad of New Jersey
- Class: G3s
- Numbers: 831–833
- Locale: Jersey City–Atlantic City
- Scrapped: 1954–55
- Disposition: All withdrawn and scrapped between 1954 and 1955.

Three brand-new G3s Pacific steam locomotives were assigned to the train: Nos. 831–833. The CNJ refurbished 16 cars for the Blue Comet service, inside and out. The train and its locomotives were painted in Packard Blue to suggest the sea and the sky. The passenger cars all had a cream band running the length of the side at the windows to evoke the sand of the shore. The paint scheme was unusual, since the road name did not appear on each car.

Each car was named for a different comet. The name of each car was placed in gold lettering at the middle of each side below the windows. The underframes and trucks were painted royal blue and varnished. The locomotives' marker lights, headlights, handrails, coupler lifting rods, cylinder head covers, and back valve chambers were nickel-plated. The white side rods were polished. The name of the train was painted in gold lettering on a blue nameboard that was mounted to the front of the locomotive smoke box just below the Elesco feedwater heater.

The train was known by the locomotive's distinctive whistle. Mounted on the fireman's side of the steam dome, it was usually angled forward. While the manufacturer and cadence of the specific whistle has not been verified (none are known to exist), it is reported to have been a long-bell 3-chime steamboat whistle similar to a Hancock or Star Brass 6" long-bell 3-chime.

In later years, as ridership declined, the usual G3s locomotives were sometimes used in other service. As a result, a variety of motive power was used. Sometimes, the Blue Comet was pulled by other CNJ fast Pacifics such as #820, or Camelback locomotives such as No. 592, which was one of the CNJ's fastest Camelbacks and could frequently be found on the point in Blue Comet service.

Each train consisted of a baggage car, combine-smoker, coaches and an observation car. Inside the train, the cars were lavishly furnished. Each car was clad in circassian walnut with a gold inlay pattern. The headliners were cream colored. Window shades were made of blue Spanish pantasote. The luggage racks were nickel-plated. Each car had a drinking fountain by the North Pole Sanitary Drinking Fountain company of Chicago. Collapsible cone-shaped paper cups with the train's logo were available via a dispenser above the fountain.

Coaches were fitted out with 64 individual seats which rotated, nickel-plated coat hooks and umbrella holders mounted to the back of the seats. Upholstery was Persian Blue, rendered in figured mohair. The observation car seats were triple-cushioned, 48 rattan lounge chairs in silver and blue, lining either side. These were upholstered in Persian blue Avalon plush, with a gold-tinted floral pattern. The coaches and combines each had a men's lavatory and toilet located at one end of the car to each side of the aisle.

The coaches and observation car were each fitted out with a generous women's lounge with an adjoining toilet. The lounge had a full-length mirror, two wicker armchairs, a boudoir chair, and a cup and towel vendor. The floor covering was a Persian blue carpet with a gold modern pattern. The combines had 48 blue leather bucket seats. The flooring was a blue-and-cream diagonal checkerboard linoleum tile. This same flooring was installed in the vestibules and lavatories as well as on the observation platform.

The diner accompanied the early-morning trip to Atlantic City and the evening return to Jersey City and could accommodate 36 patrons. Porters in blue uniforms served savory dishes and homemade goodies. The fresh apple pie with a slice of sharp cheddar cheese was a popular offering. The tables were set with the finest embroidered blue tablecloths with the train's logo, special china and flatware, and a silver base lamp with parchment shade. The lampshades had an astral pattern of comets and stars, and tinted lightbulbs were employed to cast a soft blue glow.

=== Locomotive ===
- Pilot truck
  - Commonwealth cast steel with pedestals cast integral with frame
- Trailing truck
  - Commonwealth Delta type
- Drive train
  - Pistons: 5 in (130 mm) diameter, heat treated steel casting
  - Reverse: Alco Power Reversing Gear
  - Crossheads: underhung type with forged steel box guides
  - Side Rods: floating bushings, grease cups forged solid and integral
  - Counterbalancing: 55% of the reciprocating weight
- Suspension
  - Chrome silicon manganese driving and truck springs
- Firebox
  - Stoker: Type B
- Lubrication system
  - Nathan Eight Feed mechanical lubricator with 20-pint capacity
- Throttle
  - Chambers backhead throttle valve
- Drifting valves
  - Automatic
- Automatic train control
  - Union Switch & Signal coded continuous
  - 2 × Westinghouse Simplex air compressors mounted on right side of boiler

=== Rolling stock ===
- Diner: Giacobini No. 81
- Combines: Halley No. 300, Encke No. 302
- Baggage cars: Olbers No. 391, Barnard No. 392
- Coaches: Tuttle No. 1170, Holmes No. 1171, Westphal No. 1172, D'Arrest No. 1173, Faye No. 1174, Spitaler No. 1175, Winnecke No. 1176, Brorsen No. 1177
- Observation cars: DeVico No. 1178, Biela No. 1179, Tempel No. 1169

== Crew ==
| Name | Position |
|---|---|
| Joseph T. Ross | Conductor |
| Joseph F. Walsh | Conductor |
| Robert A. Panza | Conductor |
| Walter G. Cline | Conductor |
| Edward J. Dolan | Conductor |
| Grover C. Apgar | Conductor |
| George L. Robinson | Engineer |
| John Vary Wait | Engineer |
| John Decker | Engineer |
| Thomas Manion Sr. | Engineer |
| | Engineer |
| William J. Smith | Engineer |
| Charles Patterson | Engineer |
| Pete White | Engineer |
| John "Jack" Cooper | Engineer |
| John J Barrington | Engineer |
| James Plunkett | Fireman |
| Mr. Cinque | Fireman |
| Warren Crater | Fireman |
| John Weckman | Fireman |
| Paul Kennedy | Trainman |
| James B. Roemer | Trainman |
| Joseph L Coleman | Chef |
| Lewis Herring | Dining car steward |
| Mr. Saunders | Dining car waiter |
| Mr. Adams | Dining car waiter |
| James S. McKennan | Porter |

== Retirement and preservation ==
Track ruins in Franklin Parker Preserve

All of the G3s 4-6-2 Pacifics were withdrawn from service and scrapped by the Luria Brothers between 1954 and 1955 with none surviving into preservation.

Coach No. 1176, Winnecke, was scrapped in Red Bank during the 1980s. In its last years, it had been used as a locker room. Various pieces of Winnecke were salvaged and eventually donated by the United Railroad Historical Society of New Jersey to the Black River & Western Railroad's restoration of coach No. 1009.

No. 592, a camelback locomotive, is preserved in the roundhouse at the Baltimore and Ohio Railroad Museum in Maryland.

Observation car Tempel (later known as car No. 1169) was used as various rail offices throughout the 1960s until the mid 1980s. NJ Transit eventually donated Tempel to the Tri-State Railway Historical Society, Inc. and the car was moved to Morristown. Tempel would later be moved to South Plainfield and then in 2004 to Tuckahoe, New Jersey, with ownership of the car being transferred to the County Transportation Association of New Jersey. In 2023, Tempel was restored by the West Jersey Chapter of the National Railway Historical Society.

The United Railroad Historical Society of New Jersey currently owns three cars, DeVico, Westphal and D'Arrest. The "DeVico" (later known as CNJ No. 1178) observation car was in use by NJ Transit as an inspection car from 1982 until 1993. The car, renumbered NJT-1, was donated in 2003 to the URHS to restore and repaint the car into its Blue Comet in Boonton, New Jersey.

The Westphal (later known as CNJ No. 1172) and D'Arrest (later known as CNJ No. 1173) were stored for a long time at Winslow Junction, New Jersey, awaiting plans for restoration. In March 2017, enough funds were secured to move them by truck from Winslow Junction to Boonton, followed by D'Arrest a few months later. In September of that year, both cars arrived in Boonton and were coupled up to the DeVico with plans for further restoration to return them to their Blue Comet livery and be operated on excursions.

The combination car, Halley, No. 300, was reconfigured, repainted and used in service on the Santa Fe Southern Railway. Halley has been modified a bit with the removal of the vestibules and the baggage area window has been blanked out.

In 2010, a "Jersey Coast" commuter club car, formerly used along the North Jersey Coast Line (but not in Blue Comet service), was rebuilt to look like a Blue Comet observation car by the Whippany Railway Museum in Whippany, New Jersey.

== Legacy ==
- In the 1930s, the Lionel Corporation produced a Blue Comet model train, which is now considered a desirable collectable. While the set was popular, it bore little resemblance to the actual train.
- A sixth-season episode of HBO's The Sopranos is titled "The Blue Comet". In the episode, toy train buff and mobster Bobby Baccalieri is gunned down in a hobby shop as he bargains for an antique Lionel Blue Comet set.
- The Comet passenger railcar class were introduced in the 1970s and later was named to honor the Blue Comet.
- In December 1975, a special Blue Comet Nostalgia Train operated with a steam locomotive from Raritan Bay to Bay Head along the former New York and Long Branch Railroad (today's North Jersey Coast Line). The nostalgia trip was filmed and appeared in a Christmas special edition of the Tomorrow television program with host Tom Snyder on December 25, 1975.
- Rivarossi produced a special HO-scale Blue Comet anniversary edition in 1979. It consisted of the steam locomotive, No. 831, plus two sets of four different coaches. The set was not prototypical of the actual train. International Hobby Corporation reproduced the Rivarossi HO sets, including a DCC ready locomotive.
- Overland Brass made an HO-scale limited edition of the Blue Comet locomotives. These models are accurately detailed and considered valuable.
- Bethlehem Car Works makes an HO version of the prototypical coaches, diner and combine. However, these models are not painted in Blue Comet livery.
- In 1979, The Little Rascals Christmas Special, Spanky learns that his mother (voiced by Darla Hood) is getting him a Blue Comet model train set, only to later find out that his mother had to sell her winter overcoat to buy the train. He then tries to raise the funds with the gang in order to buy the coat back.
- MTH produced several versions of the Blue Comet in O gauge. One is a faithful replica of the 1930s Lionel. Another under their Rail King line is more prototypical and features sound and synchronized smoke features.
- Aristo Craft produced a G-scale Blue Comet set. Like other manufacturers' Blue Comet representations, some minor details deviate from the original.
- Documentary filmmaker Robert A. Emmons, Jr., details the history of the Blue Comet in the 2009 documentary film De Luxe: The Tale of the Blue Comet.
- In 1998, Lionel produced a second Blue Comet with a 4-6-4 steam locomotive.
- The Black Cat Motorcycle Club of Lansdale, Pennsylvania often encountered the Blue Comet on their rides to the Jersey Shore. Members renamed the club "Blue Comet MC" in 1937.
- In 2001, Lionel produced another Blue Comet model train with a real model 4-6-2; only 1,000 were produced. This model was an entire set.
- Also in 2001, Lionel produced a separate two car pack consisting of Combo car Halley, and Coach car Tuttle.
- In 2003, Lionel produced a separate model of diner Giacobini.
- In 2009, Auran produced CGI models of the Blue Comet train as an add-on for its Trainz Railroad Simulator 2009 PC game. This package contains two G-3s models, one in the Blue Comet's blue livery and one in the later black livery, as well as a P-47 model in a similar, but unlined version of the latter livery. The package also includes models of the train's baggage, combine, coach, diner and observation cars. In 2023, a new version was released with updated graphics and features.
- In 2012, Lionel produced a fourth Blue Comet model train with a real model 4-6-2. The locomotive and four cars are sold separately.
- In 2014, up and into 2017, PIKO Model Trains & Model Buildings produced a "G"-scale version of the Blue Comet using No. 592 with its tender, along with one combine car Hailey, and two coach cars Westphal and Faye. Each of these units is sold separately.
- The bar in Newark Penn Station was named for the Blue Comet. But it closed down in 2017.
- One Blue Comet observation car Biela was moved to Clinton, New Jersey in the 1970s and continues to serve as part of a restaurant called the Clinton Station Diner. Biela was one of the cars involved in the wreck at Chatsworth in 1939.
