= Batsto River =

River in New Jersey, United States

Coordinates: 39.668283°N 74.657164°W

The Batsto River is a 22.9-mile-long (36.9 km) tributary of the Mullica River in the southern New Jersey Pine Barrens in the United States. The river also drains 49.42 square miles of land.

Originating in Tabernacle Township, the Batsto River is joined by Skit Branch, Deep Run, Springer's Brook, Penn Swamp Branch and Goodwater Run before reaching Batsto Village where a dam forms Batsto Lake. From Batsto Village, the stream continues on for a few miles before its confluence with the Mullica River at The Forks.

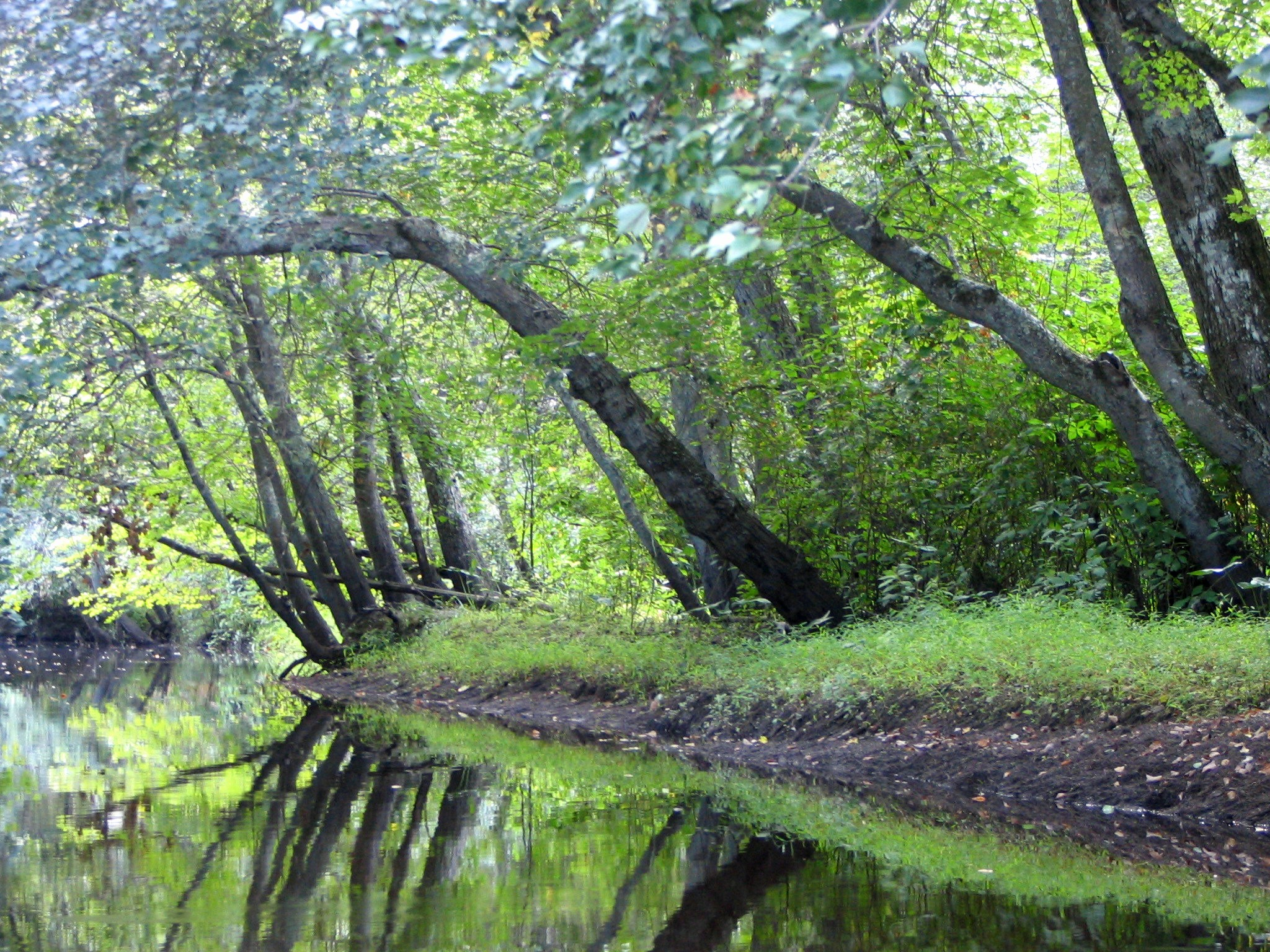
Batsto River

The Batsto River passes through multiple historic landmarks along its journey to the Mullica River. These landmarks include Hampton furnace, Lower Forge and Quaker Bridge, each being places of small settlements at one time.

== See also ==
- Batsto Village
- Wharton State Forest
- List of rivers of New Jersey
