= Central Railroad of New Jersey =

Defunct Class I railroad in the U.S. state of New Jersey (1839–1976)

- Jersey Central, Jersey Central Lines or New Jersey Central

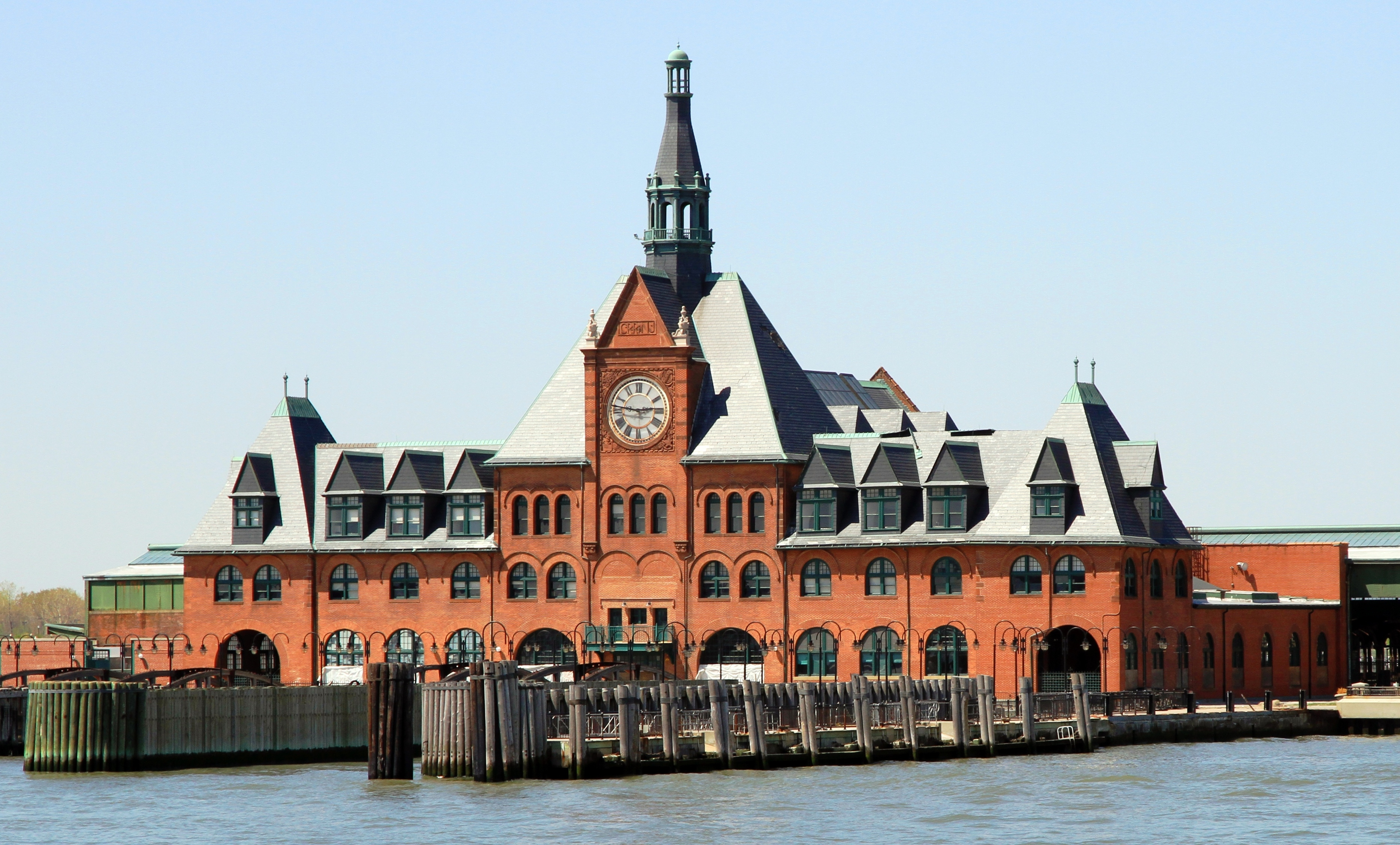
- Central Railroad of New Jersey Terminal at Liberty State Park in Jersey City, New Jersey

Overview
- Main region: New Jersey
- Other regions: New York State; Pennsylvania
- Headquarters: 148 Liberty Street; New York City, U.S.
- Founders: John Taylor Johnston; John Kean
- Reporting mark: CNJ
- Dates of operation: 1839–1976
- Successors: Conrail (freight); Raritan Valley Line (passenger)

Technical
- Length: 693 miles (1,115 kilometres)

The Central Railroad of New Jersey, also known as the Jersey Central, Jersey Central Lines or New Jersey Central (reporting mark CNJ), was a Class I railroad with origins in the 1830s. It was absorbed into Conrail in April 1976 along with several other prominent bankrupt railroads of the northeastern United States.

The CNJ's main line had a major presence in New Jersey. Most of the main line is now used by the Raritan Valley Line passenger service. CNJ main line trackage in Phillipsburg, New Jersey, became part of the Lehigh Line under Conrail.

== History ==
=== 19th century ===
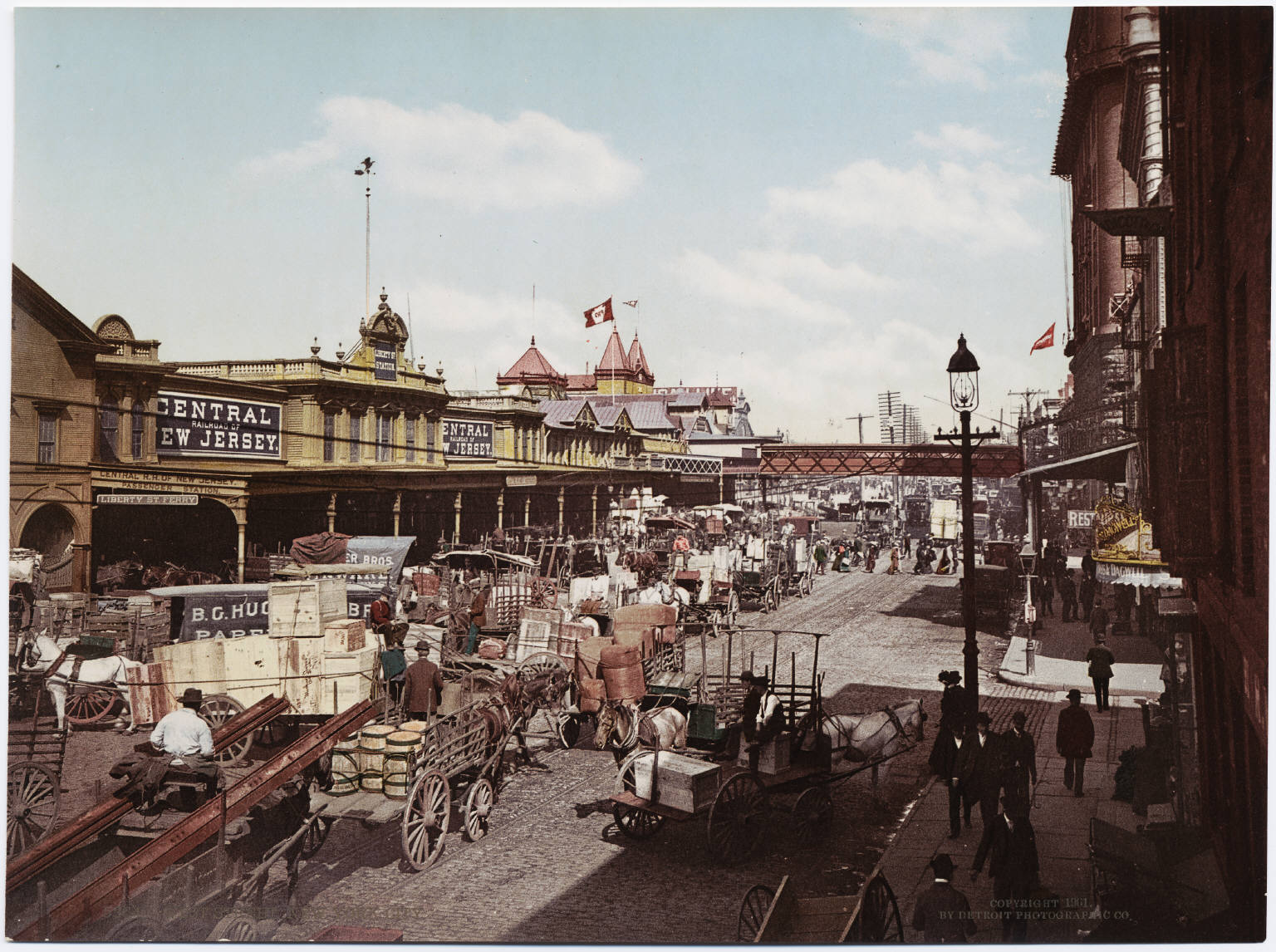
CNJ's Liberty Street Ferry Terminal in New York City, c. 1900

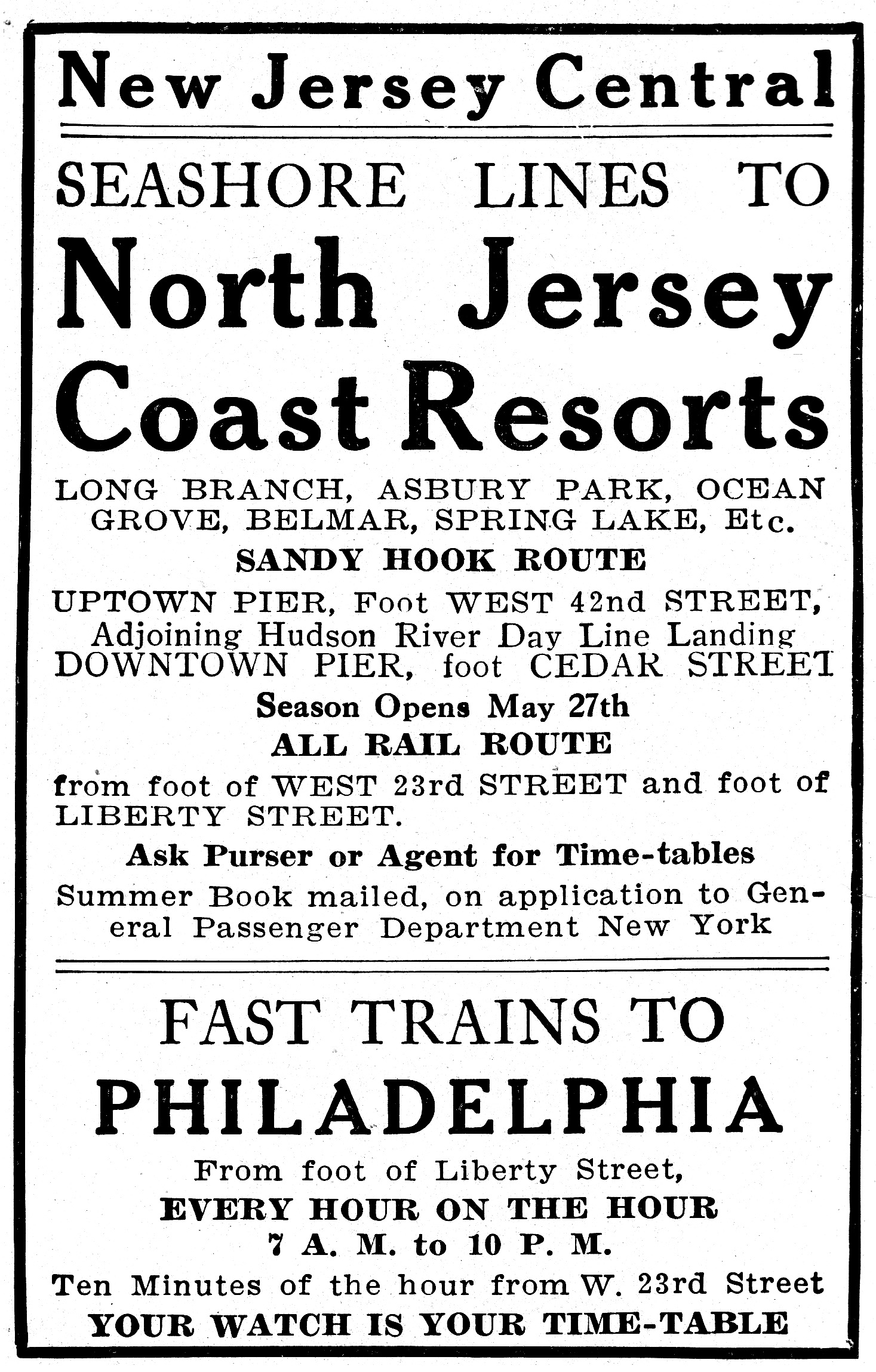
A 1915 CNJ advertisement for service from New York City to Philadelphia

The earliest railroad ancestor of the CNJ was the Elizabethtown & Somerville Railroad, incorporated in 1831 and opened from Elizabethport to Elizabeth, New Jersey, in 1836. Horses gave way to steam in 1839, and the railroad was extended west, reaching Somerville at the beginning of 1842. The Somerville and Easton Railroad was incorporated in 1847 and began building westward. Originally laid to a track gauge of 4 ft 10 in (1,473 mm), it was changed to standard gauge in 1847.

In 1849, it purchased the Elizabethtown & Somerville and adopted a new name: Central Railroad Company of New Jersey. The line reached Phillipsburg, on the east bank of the Delaware River, in 1852. It was extended east across Newark Bay to Jersey City in 1864, and it gradually acquired branches to Flemington, Newark, Perth Amboy, Chester, and Wharton.

The New Jersey Southern (NJS) began construction in 1860 at Port Monmouth. The railroad worked its way southwest across lower New Jersey and reached Bayside, New Jersey, on the Delaware River west of Bridgeton, New Jersey in 1871. The NJS came under control of the CNJ in 1879. CNJ's influence briefly extended across the Delaware River in the form of the Baltimore & Delaware Bay Railroad, from Bombay Hook, Delaware, east of Townsend, to Chestertown, Maryland. That line became part of the Pennsylvania Railroad (PRR) family in 1901.

CNJ's lines in Pennsylvania were built by the Lehigh Coal & Navigation Company as the Lehigh and Susquehanna Railroad (L&S). The main line was completed between Phillipsburg, New Jersey, and Wilkes-Barre in 1866. A notable feature of the line was the Ashley Planes, a steep stretch of line (maximum grade was 14.65%) operated by cables driven by stationary engines, which would remain in service until after World War II. CNJ leased the L&S in 1871. The line was extended to Scranton in 1888 by a subsidiary of the L&S, the Wilkes-Barre & Scranton; L&S leased the line upon completion and assigned the lease to the CNJ. The bulk of the traffic on the Pennsylvania lines was anthracite coal, much of it produced by subsidiaries of the railroad, until the Commodities Clause of the Interstate Commerce Act of 1920 forbade railroads to haul freight in which they had an interest.

From 1883 to 1887, the CNJ was leased to and operated by the Philadelphia & Reading Railroad, with which it formed a New York-Philadelphia route. CNJ resumed its own management after reorganization in 1887.

The primary rolling stock repair shops were located in Elizabethport, New Jersey, along Trumbull Avenue. In 1901, the original shops were razed. New, concrete shops took their place, capable of servicing 430 locomotives and 20,000 freight cars annually. With the primary freight and passenger yards at Jersey City, New Jersey, opposite Manhattan, a terminal and shop site was also needed in the Communipaw neighborhood. This facility was modernized in 1914 and included two roundhouses and light repair shops.

=== 20th century ===
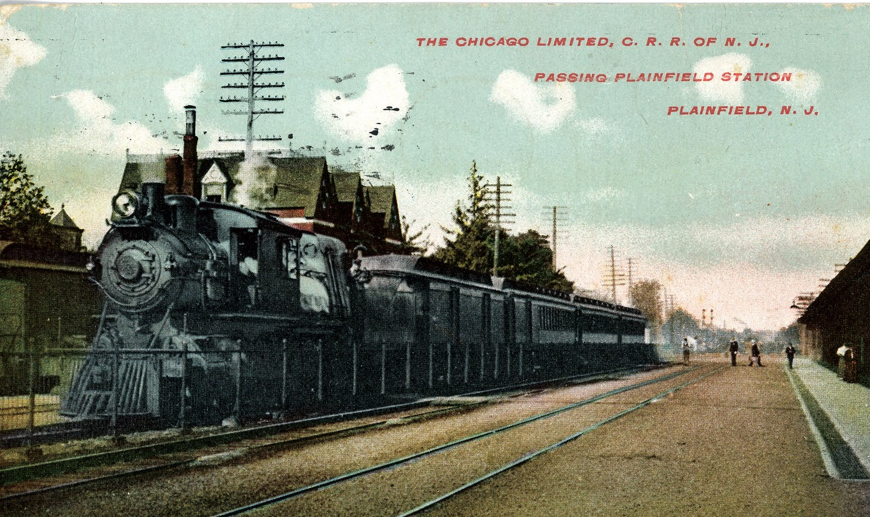
CNJ train at Plainfield station in 1910

In 1901, the Reading Company (RDG), successor to the Philadelphia & Reading, acquired control of the CNJ through purchase of a majority of its stock, and at about the same time Baltimore & Ohio Railroad (B&O) acquired control of the RDG, gaining access to New York over RDG and CNJ rails.

In 1929, CNJ inaugurated the Blue Comet, a deluxe coach train operating twice daily between Jersey City and Atlantic City. It was painted blue from the pilot of its 4-6-2 to the rear bulkhead of its observation car, and its refurbished cars offered a level of comfort much higher than the usual day coach of the era. The train was the forerunner of the coach streamliners that blossomed nationwide in the late 1930s and the 1940s. It succumbed to automobile competition in 1941. Also in 1929 CNJ purchased a 30 percent interest in the Raritan River Railroad, a 12-mile (19 km) short line from South Amboy to New Brunswick. In 1931 it acquired total ownership of the Wharton & Northern Railroad and a partial interest in the Mount Hope Mineral Railroad from Warren Foundry & Pipe Corporation.

Revenue freight traffic, in millions of net ton-miles
Year	Traffic
1925	2513
1933	1511
1944	3735
1960	1948
1970	1455

Revenue passenger traffic, in millions of passenger-miles.
Year	Traffic
1925	480
1933	337
1944	480
1960	175
1970	124

Following World War II, passenger traffic diminished, and was almost entirely commuter business, requiring great amounts of rolling stock for two short periods five days a week. Three-fourths of CNJ's freight traffic terminated on line; the railroad was essentially a terminal carrier, which meant little if any profit. In addition, taxes levied by the state of New Jersey ate up much of CNJ's revenue.

In 1946, the lines in Pennsylvania were organized as the Central Railroad of Pennsylvania (CRP) in an effort to escape taxation by the state of New Jersey. CNJ resumed its own operation of the Pennsylvania lines at the end of 1952. The CRP continued in existence as owner of the Easton & Western, four miles of track in Easton, Pennsylvania.

The merger between the Chesapeake and Ohio Railway and Norfolk and Western Railway proposed in 1965 sought to counter the impending PRR merger with New York Central Railroad merger was to have included CNJ, but the bankruptcy of Penn Central Transportation Company killed that prospect. CNJ drafted elaborate plans for reorganization; they came to naught as neighboring railroads collapsed. Conrail took over freight operations of the CNJ on April 1, 1976; passenger routes were transferred to the New Jersey Department of Transportation, including the present New Jersey Transit North Jersey Coast Line and Raritan Valley Line.

In 1961, the Lehigh and New England Railroad was abandoned, and CNJ acquired a few of its branches and organized them as the Lehigh and New England Railroad. In 1963, Lehigh Coal & Navigation sold its railroad properties to the RDG, although the lease to the CNJ continued.

In 1964, the state of New Jersey began subsidizing commuter service, and the tax situation changed in 1967.

In 1965, CNJ and the Lehigh Valley Railroad consolidated their lines along the Lehigh River in Pennsylvania and portions of each railroad's line were abandoned; the commercial anthracite traffic that had supported both railroads had largely disappeared. CNJ operations in Pennsylvania ended March 31, 1972.

CNJ maintained a small carfloat terminal in The Bronx. It was the site of the first successful Class 1 railroad diesel operation. Over the years, CNJ maintained an extensive marine operation on New York Bay, including a steamer line to Sandy Hook.

On April 30, 1967, CNJ's last marine service—the ferry line between Manhattan and CNJ's rail terminal at Jersey City—made its last run, which was also the last day for the terminal itself; the next day CNJ passenger trains began originating and terminating at the PRR station in Newark via the Aldene Connection, where New York City passengers could transfer to either PRR or Port Authority Trans-Hudson (PATH) trains.

On August 6, 1978, the Bayonne "Scoot" ran for the last time. The CRRNJ Newark Bay Bridge would be abandoned and the lift spans demolished in July and August 1980.

In 1979, CNJ emerged from bankruptcy as Central Jersey Industries, later renamed CJI Industries. In 1986, it merged with the packaging company Triangle Industries, owned by Nelson Peltz.

== Main initial corridors ==
CNJ had its northeastern terminus at Elizabethport, New Jersey. In 1864, CNJ extended its railroad across the bay into Bayonne, and north to the Jersey City terminus. It used a succession of bridges over the years, the last being Newark Bay Bridge, demolished in the 1980s.

From Elizabethport, trains went to different corridors. One headed towards Elizabeth and Plainfield and points west and southwest. The second went south towards Perth Amboy and today's North Jersey Coast Line and different southern New Jersey destinations. CNJ operated several trains into Pennsylvania and other points west or south, in association with the RDG. B&O also used CNJ tracks for the final approach to Jersey City. Trains also headed for Bayonne and Jersey City, as well as toward Newark.

== Portions still operated ==
- Aldene-High Bridge (Main Line): New Jersey Transit (NJT) Raritan Valley Line
- Jersey City-Bayonne (Main Line and Newark and New York Branch): NJT Hudson-Bergen Light Rail
- Perth Amboy-Bay Head: NJT North Jersey Coast Line
- Elizabethport-Aldene; Elizabethport-Perth Amboy; Red Bank-Lakehurst: Conrail Shared Assets Operations
- Lakehurst-Woodmansie: Cape May Seashore Lines
- Winslow Junction – Vineland, NJ: Southern Railroad of New Jersey – Mostly abandoned, sporadically paved over, buried, and or removed between Williamstown and Vineland, NJ following damaged sustained to the line in 2003. Remnant of CNJ Southern Division Main line.
- Dover & Rockaway Branch (Wharton-Rockaway); High Bridge Branch (Kenvil-Flanders): Morristown & Erie Railway
- White Haven PA – Laurel Run PA: Reading Blue Mountain and Northern – remnant of the joint operation with the Lehigh Valley post-1965
- Vineland – Bridgeton, NJ: Winchester and Western Railroad – Remnant of CNJ Southern Division Main line.
- Bridgeton – Port Norris, NJ :: Winchester and Western Railroad – Bridgeton – Bivalve, NJ branch line torn up East of Whitehead Rd, in Port Norris, remainder operational.

== Gallery ==
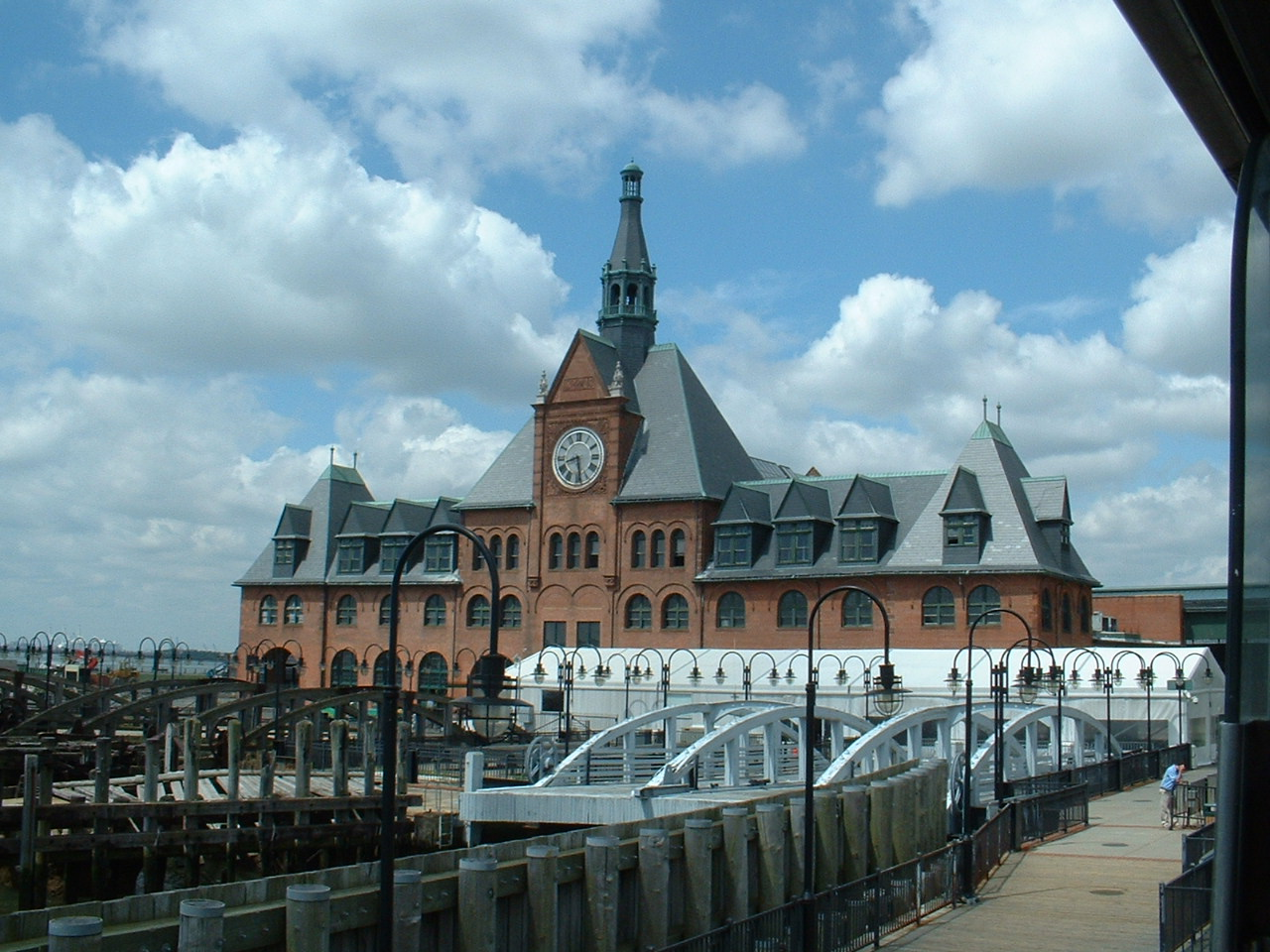
Communipaw Terminal, Jersey City

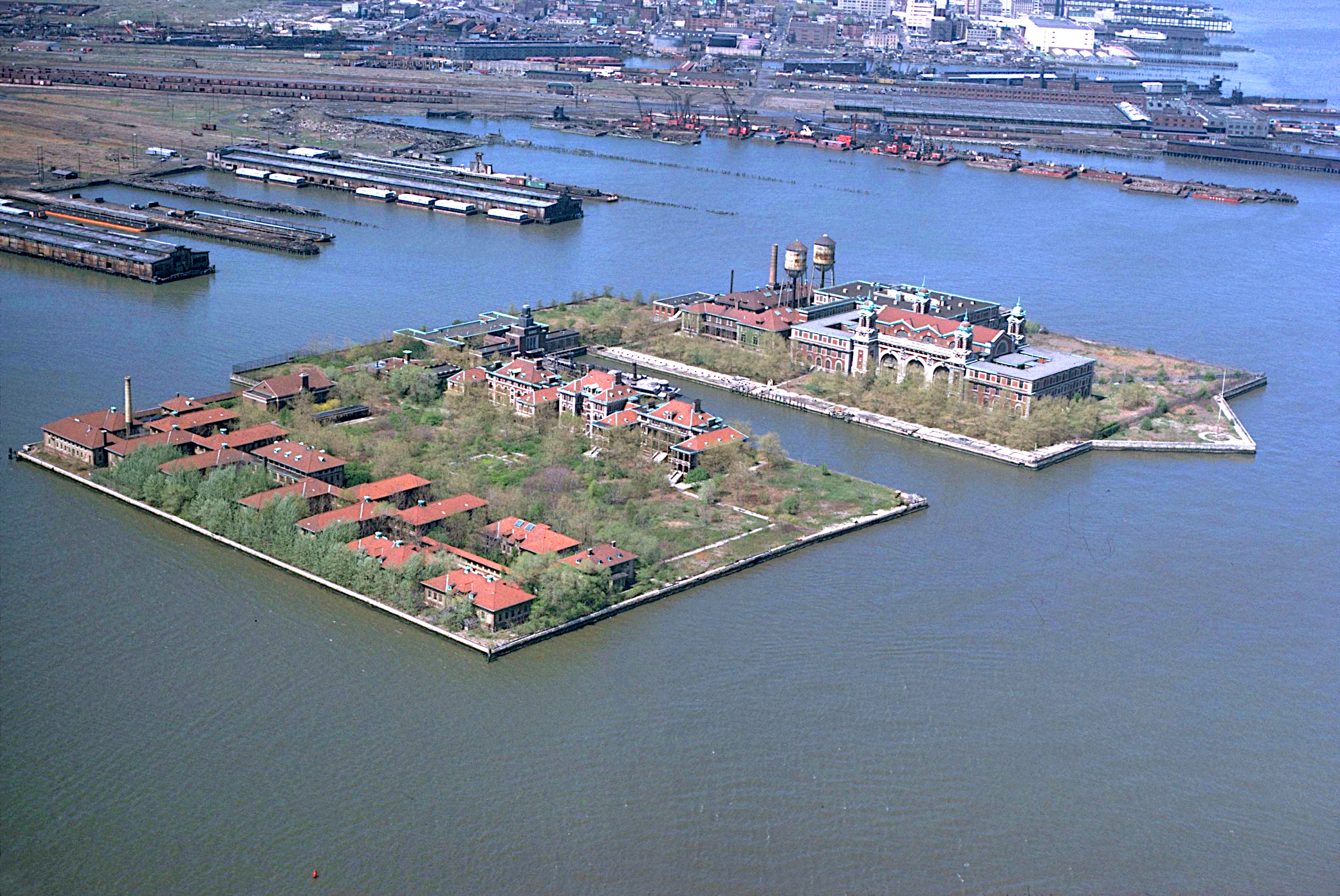
Communipaw Terminal and extensive yards with Ellis Island in foreground on the Upper Bay

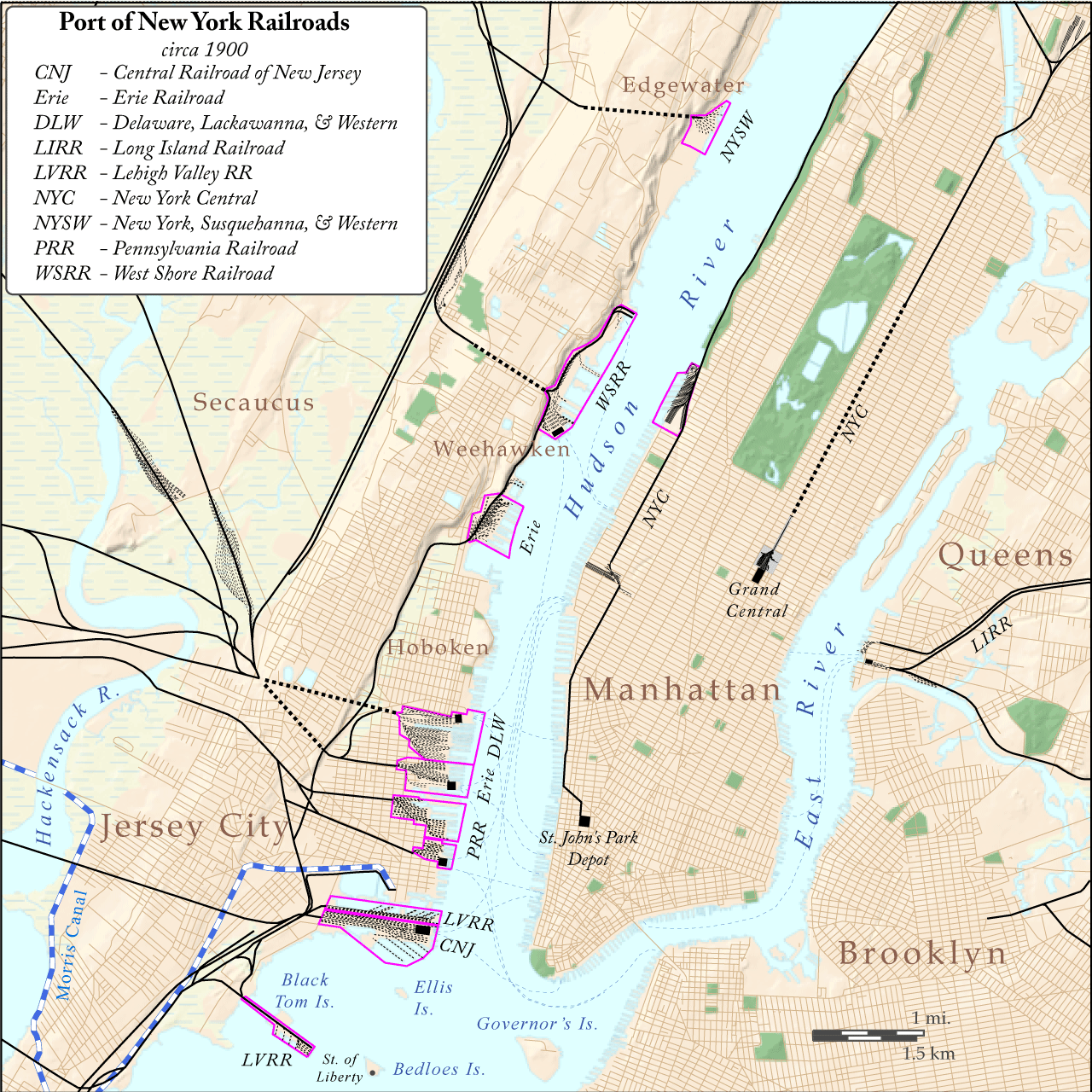
Map of CNJ and other terminals on the Hudson Waterfront, circa 1900

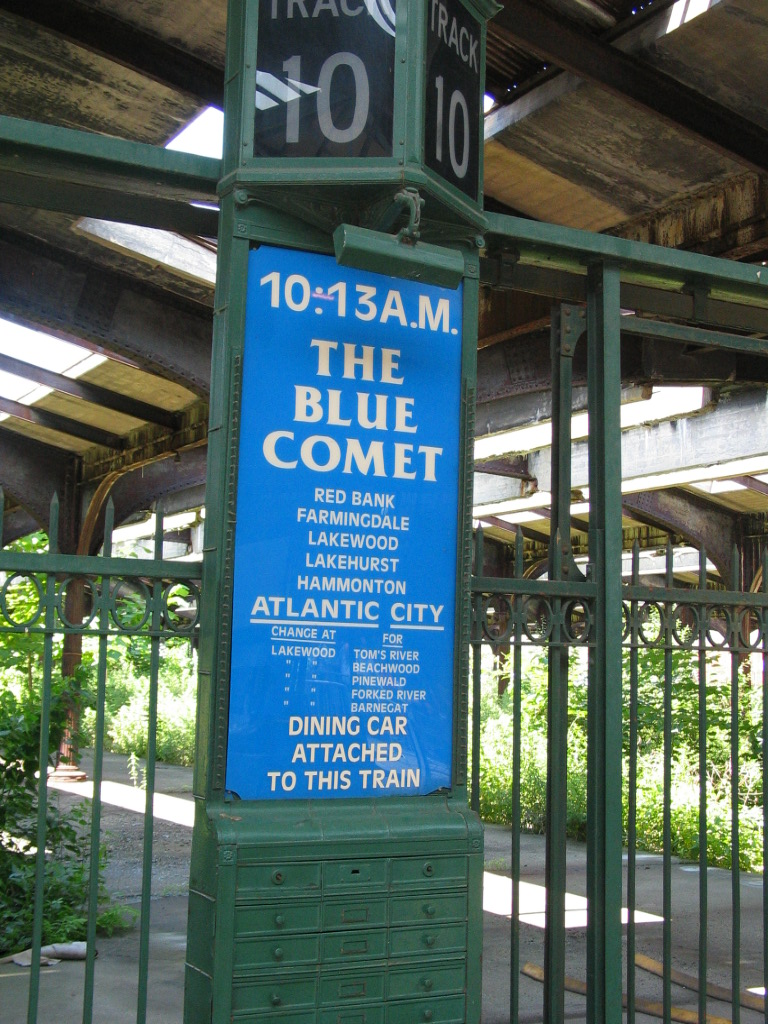
Reproduction of a tablet designator for the Blue Comet

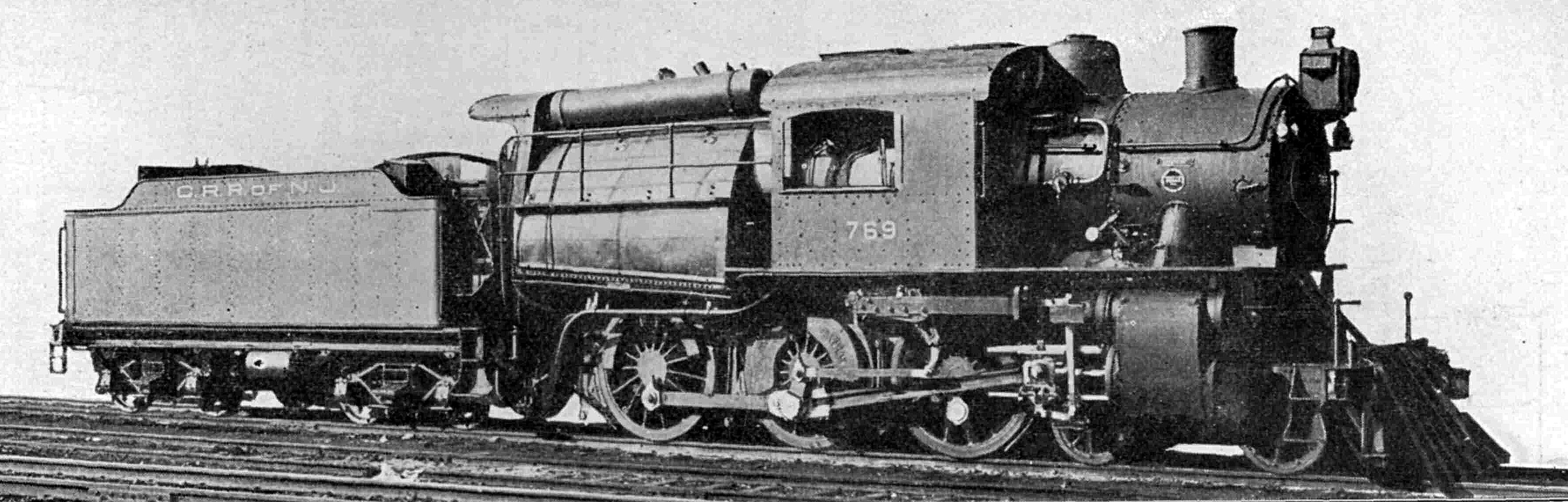
CNJ camelback locomotive built by Baldwin in 1912.

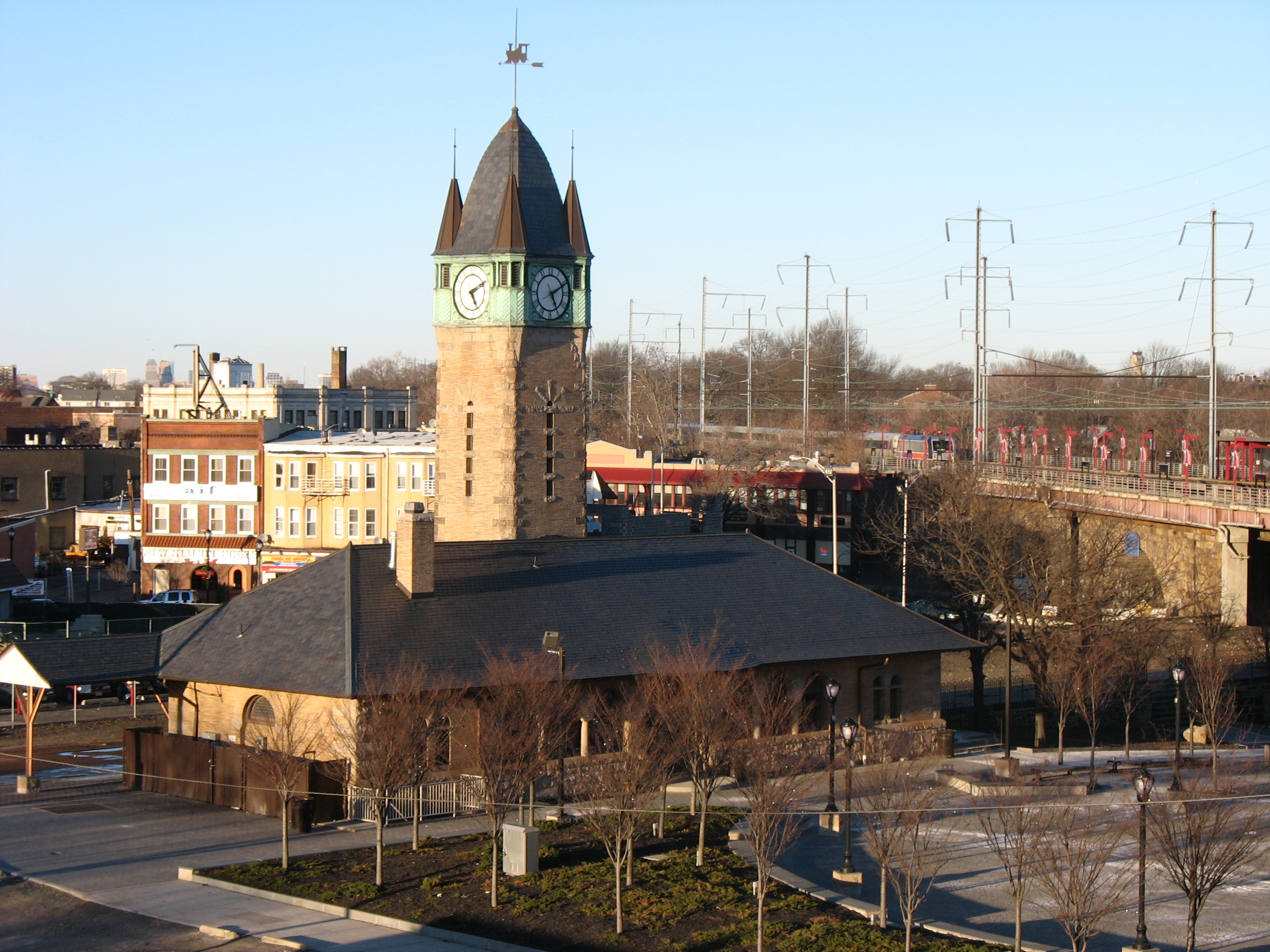
Elizabeth Station

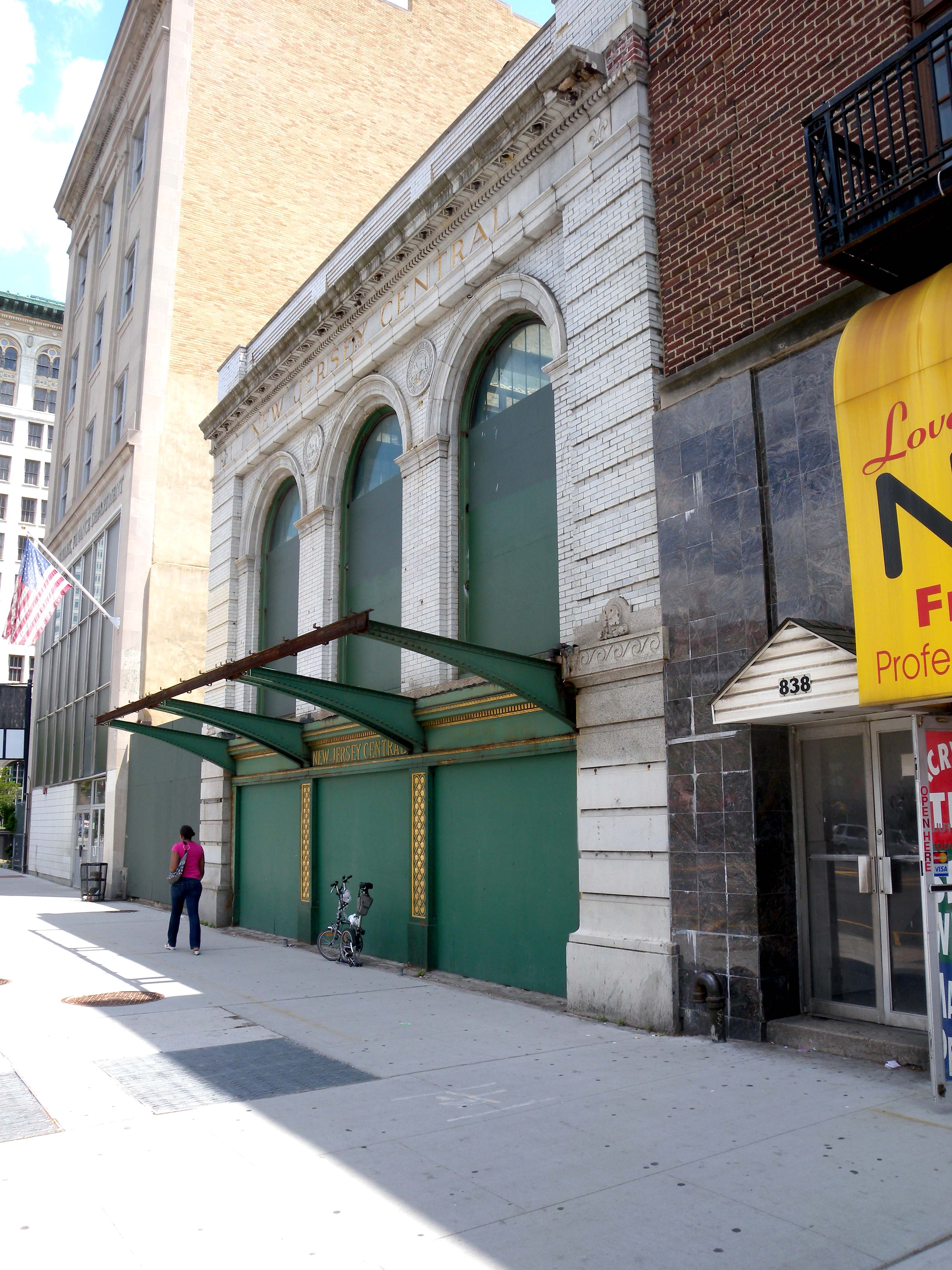
Broad Street station, Newark

Track ruins in Franklin Parker Preserve

== Predecessor railroads ==
- Buena Vista Railroad
- Carteret & Sewaren Railroad
- Carteret Extension Railroad
- Cumberland & Maurice River Railroad
- Cumberland & Maurice River Extension Railroad
- Elizabeth Extension Railroad
- Freehold & Atlantic Highlands Railroad
- Lafayette Railroad
- Manufacturers' Extension Railroad
- Middle Brook Railroad
- New Jersey Terminal Railroad
- New Jersey Southern Railroad
- Navesink Railroad
- Passaic River Extension Railroad
- Raritan North Shore Railroad
- Sound Shore Railroad
- Toms River Railroad
- Toms River & Barnegat Railroad
- Vineland Railroad
- Vineland Branch Railway
- West Side Connecting Railroad
- West End Railroad

== Named passenger trains ==
CNJ operated several named trains, most of which were interstate operations:

- Blue Comet: Jersey City, New Jersey-Atlantic City, New Jersey
- Bullet: Jersey City-Wilkes-Barre, Pennsylvania via Allentown, Pennsylvania
- Crusader: Jersey City-Philadelphia, Pennsylvania (with RDG)
- Interstate Express: Syracuse, New York-Philadelphia, Pennsylvania (with the Delaware, Lackawanna & Western Railroad and RDG)
- Mermaid: Sandy Hook, New Jersey-Scranton, Pennsylvania
- Queen of the Valley: Jersey City-Harrisburg, Pennsylvania (with RDG)
- Wall Street: Jersey City-Philadelphia, Pennsylvania (with RDG)
- Williamsporter: Jersey City, New Jersey-Williamsport, Pennsylvania

Several non-CNJ trains operated over CNJ trackage north of Bound Brook, New Jersey to the Jersey City terminal:

- Capitol Limited: Jersey City, New Jersey-Chicago, Illinois (B&O)
- National Limited: Jersey City, New Jersey-St. Louis, Missouri (B&O)
- Royal Blue: Jersey City, New Jersey-Washington, D.C. (B&O)

== Heritage units ==
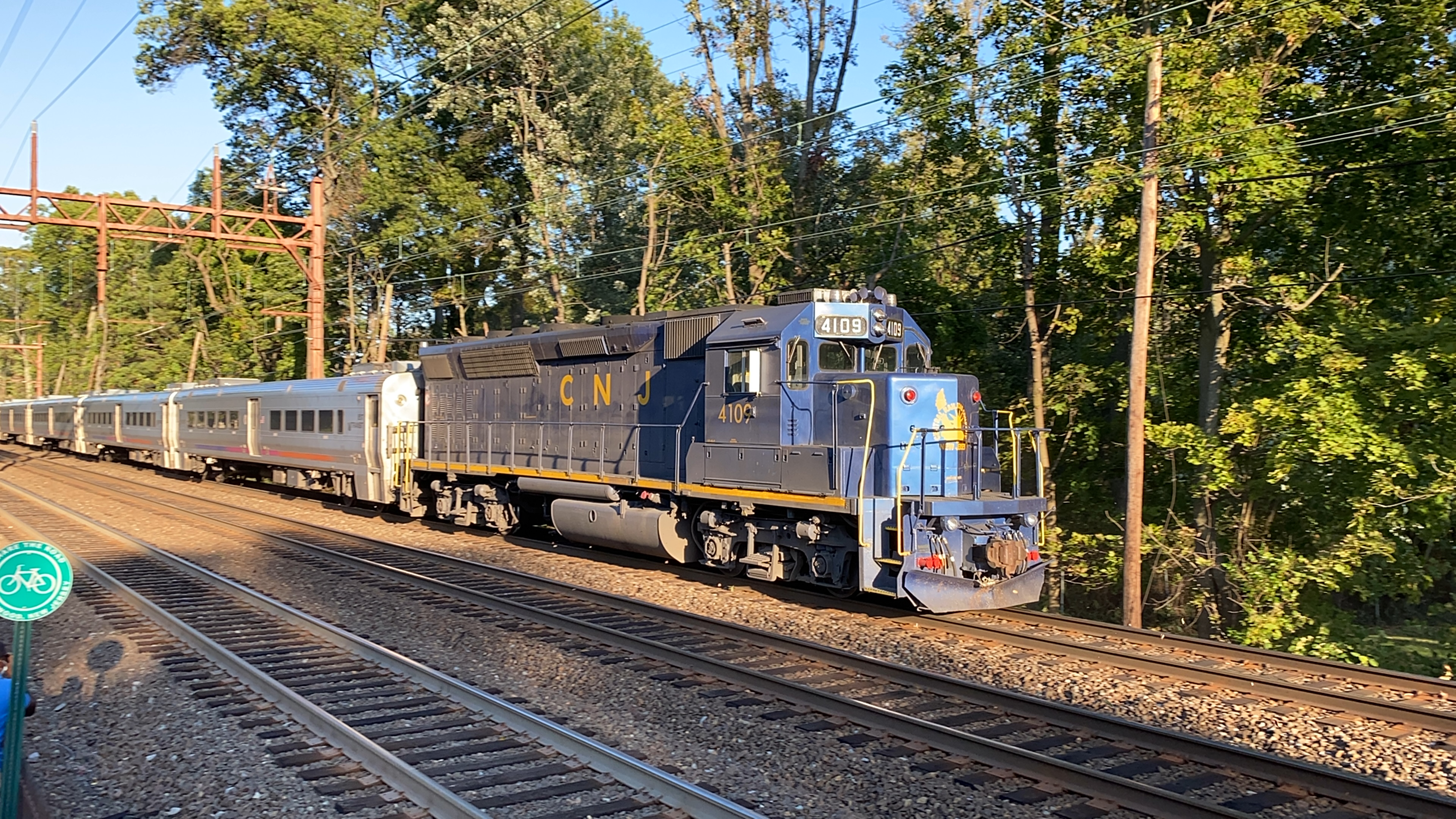
GP40PH-2 4109 enters Maplewood Station

To celebrate its 30th anniversary in 2012, Norfolk Southern painted 20 new locomotives with predecessor schemes. NS #1071, an EMD SD70ACe locomotive, was painted with the CNJ orange and blue.

In 2019, NJ Transit painted locomotive 4109 in a heritage scheme based on that of the CNJ GP40P.

== See also ==
- Central Railroad of Pennsylvania
- SS Asbury Park, a crack coastal steamer built for the CNJ in 1903, and subsequently rebuilt and operated as a car ferry in San Francisco Bay (1919 to 1940), Puget Sound (1943 to 1951), and the Strait of Georgia (1952 to 1976)
