= Apple Pie Hill =

Hill in Burlington County, New Jersey

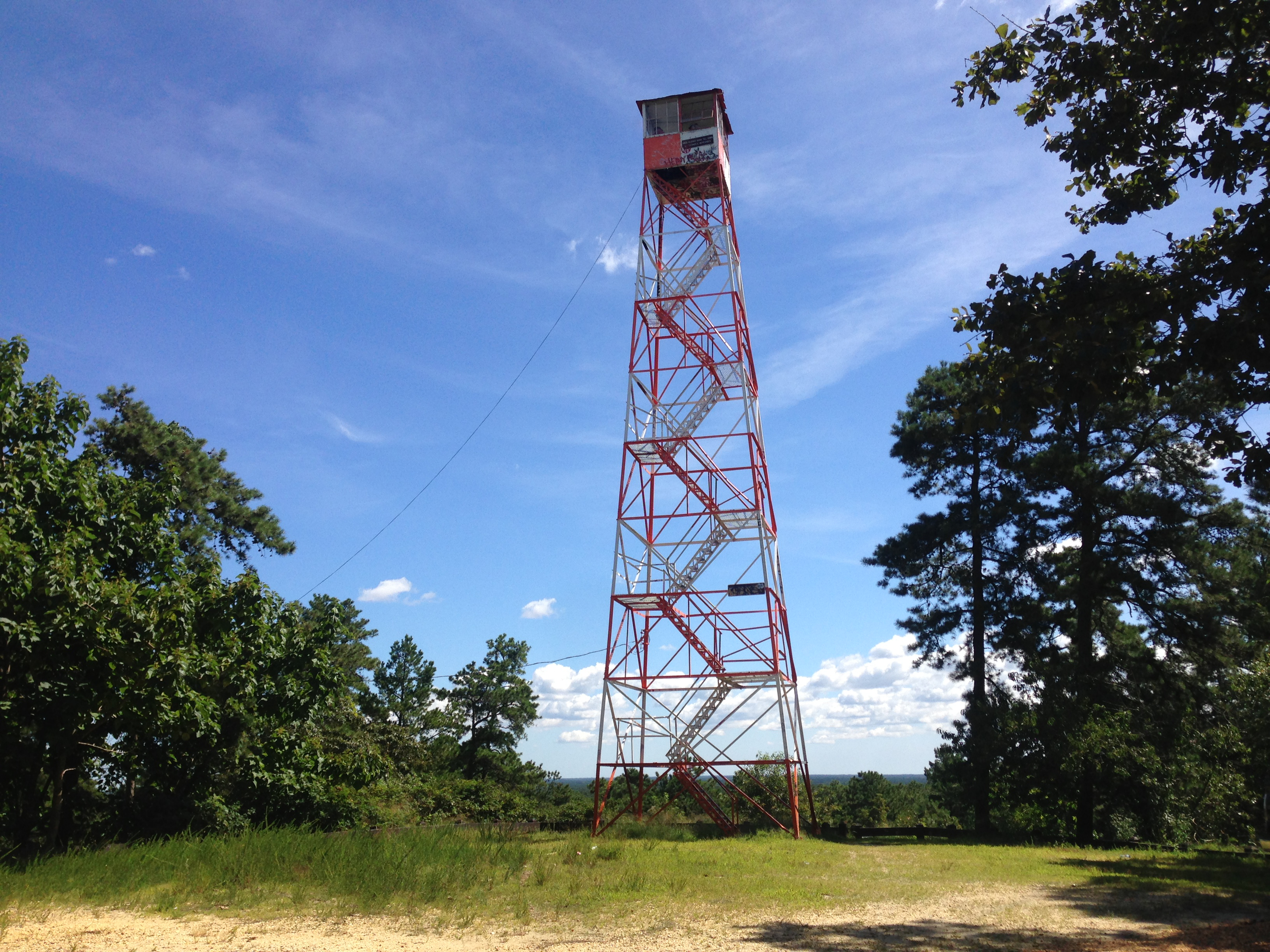
- Summit of Apple Pie Hill

Highest point
- Elevation: 205 ft (62 m)
- Coordinates: 39°48′26″N 74°35′22″W

Geography
- Location within Burlington County, New Jersey
- Location: Wharton State Forest, Tabernacle Township, Burlington County, New Jersey, U.S.
- Topo map: USGS Chatsworth

Climbing
- Easiest route: Batona Trail (hike)

Apple Pie Hill is a hill in Tabernacle Township, Burlington County, New Jersey. It is 205 feet (62 m) tall, making it one of the highest points of the New Jersey Pine Barrens. A 60-foot-tall (18 m) fire tower stands atop the summit, offering views of the surrounding Pine Barrens. The skylines of Atlantic City and Philadelphia are visible from the top of the tower. It lies along the Batona Trail in Wharton State Forest, making it a popular hiking destination.

On September 10, 2016, due to vandalism, the Department of Environmental Protection closed Apple Pie Hill to public access by erecting a fence around the tower. However, the tower is open to visitors when staff members are present and by appointment.

Soils are sandy almost everywhere, with profiles that resemble classic podzol development; Atsion, Lakehurst, Lakewood, and Woodmansie are common soil series. A small area around the summit has finer-textured (silt loam to sandy loam) ultisol soils mostly mapped as Keyport series.

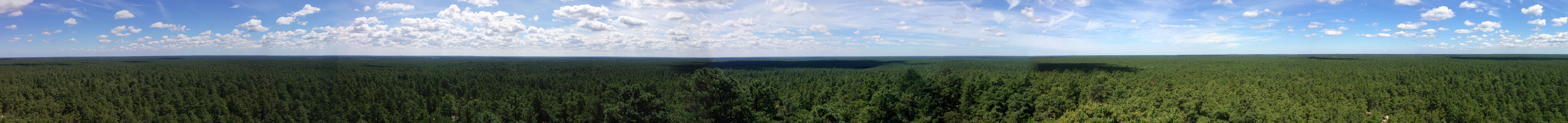
View from the fire tower atop Apple Pie Hill
