= Franklin Parker Preserve =

Nature preserve in New Jersey

Coordinates: 39.814181°N 74.547598°W

- Interactive map of Franklin Parker Preserve
- Type: Nature preserve
- Area: 11,379 acres (4,605 ha)
- Created: 2003
- Owner: New Jersey Conservation Foundation
- Open: Year round
- Hiking trails: Four main hiking trails plus short connector trails
- Habitats: Forested wetlands
- Website: Official website

Franklin Parker Preserve is an 11,379 acre natural preserve located in the Pine Barrens in Chatsworth, New Jersey. The preserve links Brendan Byrne, Wharton, and Penn State Forests. Franklin Parker Preserve is owned and managed by New Jersey Conservation Foundation.

== Description ==
Geography is typical of the Pine Barrens with sandy roads, pitch pines, cedar swamps, blueberry fields and tributaries of the Wading River. The 53 mile Batona Trail runs through parts of the preserve and the preserve provides habitat for rare, threatened or endangered species including bobcats, bald eagles, barred owls, northern pine snakes and pine barrens tree frogs. The area also serves as a filter for rainwater that makes its way into the Kirkwood-Cohansey aquifer.

== History ==
Franklin Parker Preserve was a former cranberry farm that was once the third largest cranberry producer in the US. The farm was owned by Garfield DeMarco, an influential Burlington County Republican Chairman. He frequently opposed many of the pineland's preservation regulations but he decided to sell the land at a significant discount versus the land's estimated value in order to preserve it. The land was purchased by New Jersey Conservation Foundation in 2003 after they were able to raise the funds for preservation. After securing additional adjacent tracts of land from private owners in 2015 and 2016 the total acreage of the preserve is now 11,379. The preserve is named after Franklin E. Parker III, the first chairman of the New Jersey Pinelands Commission.

== Location and parking ==
Located in the New Jersey Pine Barrens, the preserve has two entrances, each with a sandy parking lot. The Chatsworth Lake entrance is the northernmost access (1450 County Road 532, Chatsworth, NJ 08019) and the Speedwell entrance is the southernmost access (3705 County Road 563, Chatsworth, NJ 08019).

There are portable toilets located at or near both parking locations. Chatsworth location is about a five-minute walk down the trail.

== Recreation options ==
- Hiking
- X-country Skiing
- Birding
- Photography
- Families outing
- Biking (trail bikes)
- Fishing
- Hunting
- Horseback riding

== Things to see ==
- Two wildlife observation stations
- Small suspension bridge over a stream
- Blueberry fields
- Rare, threatened or endangered species
- Wetlands
- Pitch pine forest
- Old cranberry bogs

== Hiking ==
Approximately 30 miles of marked trails are available for hiking. There are four main trails (red-hiking only, green, white, yellow-multipurpose) as well as connector trails (marked in blue) to allow for shortcuts and loops. Of interest, hiking along the red trail will take you across a small suspension bridge over a stream. Two wildlife observation platforms can be found; one along the red/green and one along the white trail.

The terrain is flat and hiking is easy while trails are predominantly sandy.
