= Brendan T. Byrne State Forest =

State forest in the New Jersey Pine Barrens in the U.S. state of New Jersey

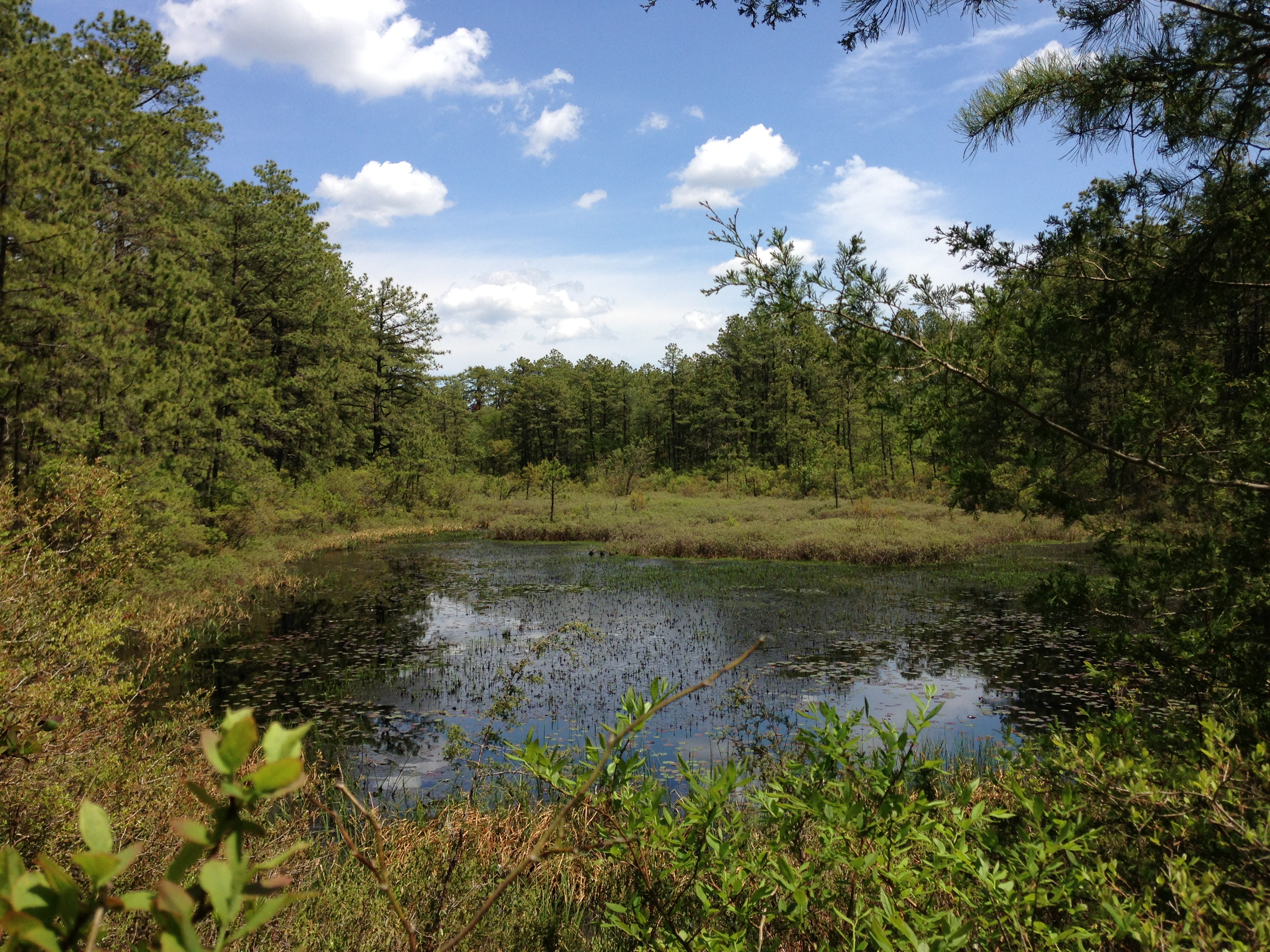
- Cranberry bog in Brendan T. Byrne State Forest

- Location within New Jersey Location within the United States
- Location: Burlington and Ocean Counties
- Coordinates: 39°53′28″N 74°34′47″W
- Area: 37,242-acre (150.71 km^{2})
- Opened: 1908
- Operator: New Jersey Division of Parks and Forestry
- Website: Official website

The Brendan T. Byrne State Forest (formerly the Lebanon State Forest) is a 37,242 acres (150.71 km^{2}) state forest in the New Jersey Pine Barrens. Its protected acreage is split between Burlington and Ocean Counties.

== Description ==
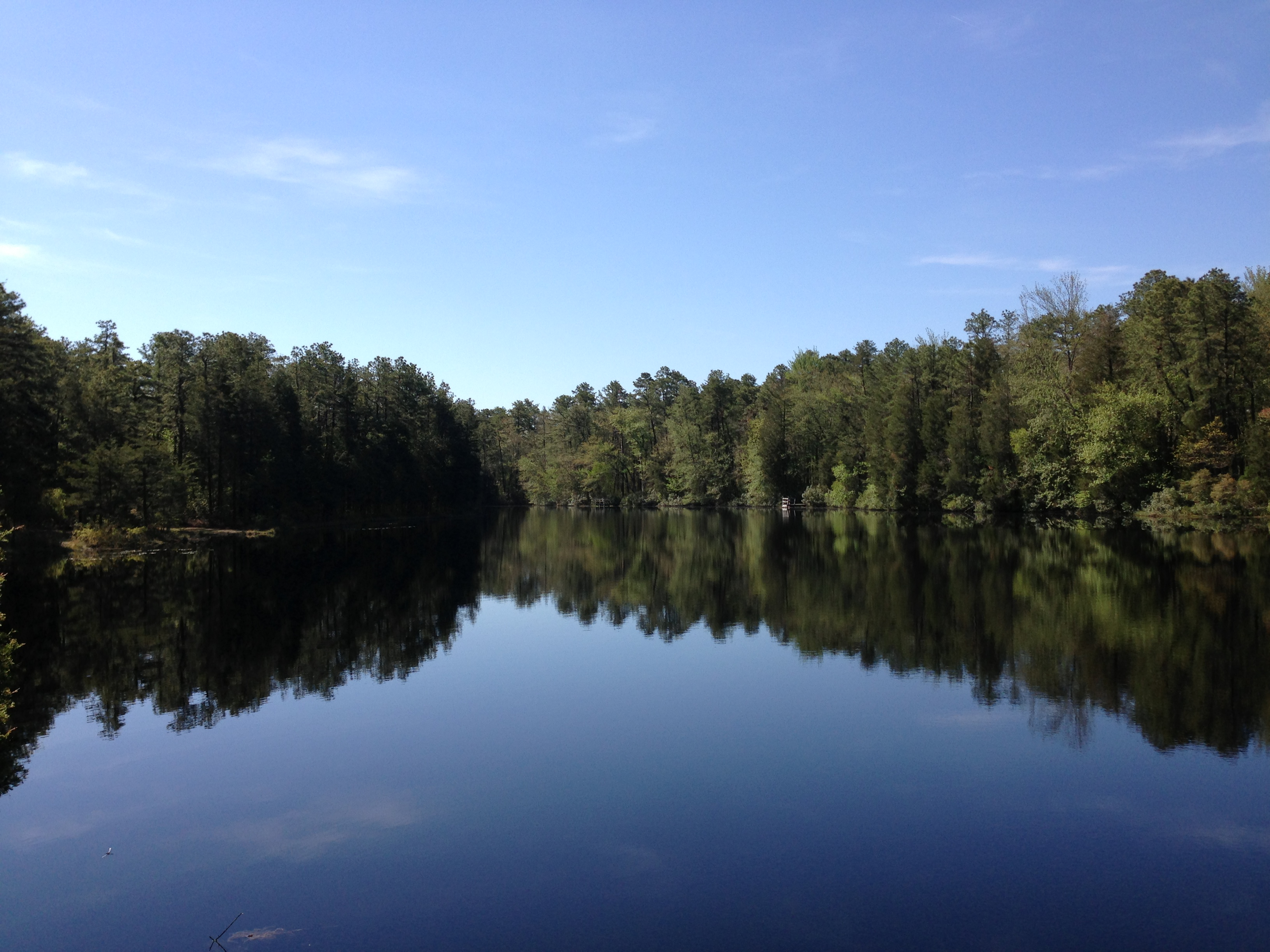
Pakim Pond in Brendan T Byrne State Forest

The Brendan T. Byrne State Forest is the state's second largest state forest (after Wharton State Forest). There are 25 miles (40 km) of hiking trails and a camping area. The park is operated and maintained by the New Jersey Division of Parks and Forestry. Originally named for the Lebanon Glassworks, which operated in the 1850s and 1860s, it was renamed for Brendan Byrne in 2004. Byrne served as governor of New Jersey from 1974 to 1982. He championed and signed the Pinelands Protection Act in February 1979 which preserved thousand of acres in southern New Jersey. The park was renamed for him during the 25th anniversary of the Pinelands legislation by then Governor James McGreevey.

The forest lies within the Atlantic coastal pine barrens ecoregion. It includes the 735-acre (2.97 km^{2}) Cedar Swamp Natural Area: with upland pine–oak forest, oak-pine forest, pitch pine lowland forest, and Atlantic white cedar swamp forest plant communities. The Natural Area protects habitat of the threatened Swamp pink and other endangered plant species.

== Trails ==
The Mount Misery Trail is a multi-use trail and allows mountain biking. The Cranberry Trail is wheelchair-accessible. The Batona Trail, designed for hiking, cross country skiing, and snowshoeing, is almost 50 miles (80 km) in length; it links the Brendan T. Byrne, Wharton, and Bass River State Forests. There is a loop trail of about 2 miles (3.2 km), starting at the forest office, and a 1 mile (1.6 km) loop at Pakim Pond. By combining different trails with the Batona Trail, loops of 6 miles (9.7 km) and 14 miles (23 km) provide day hikes.

== Blueberry history ==
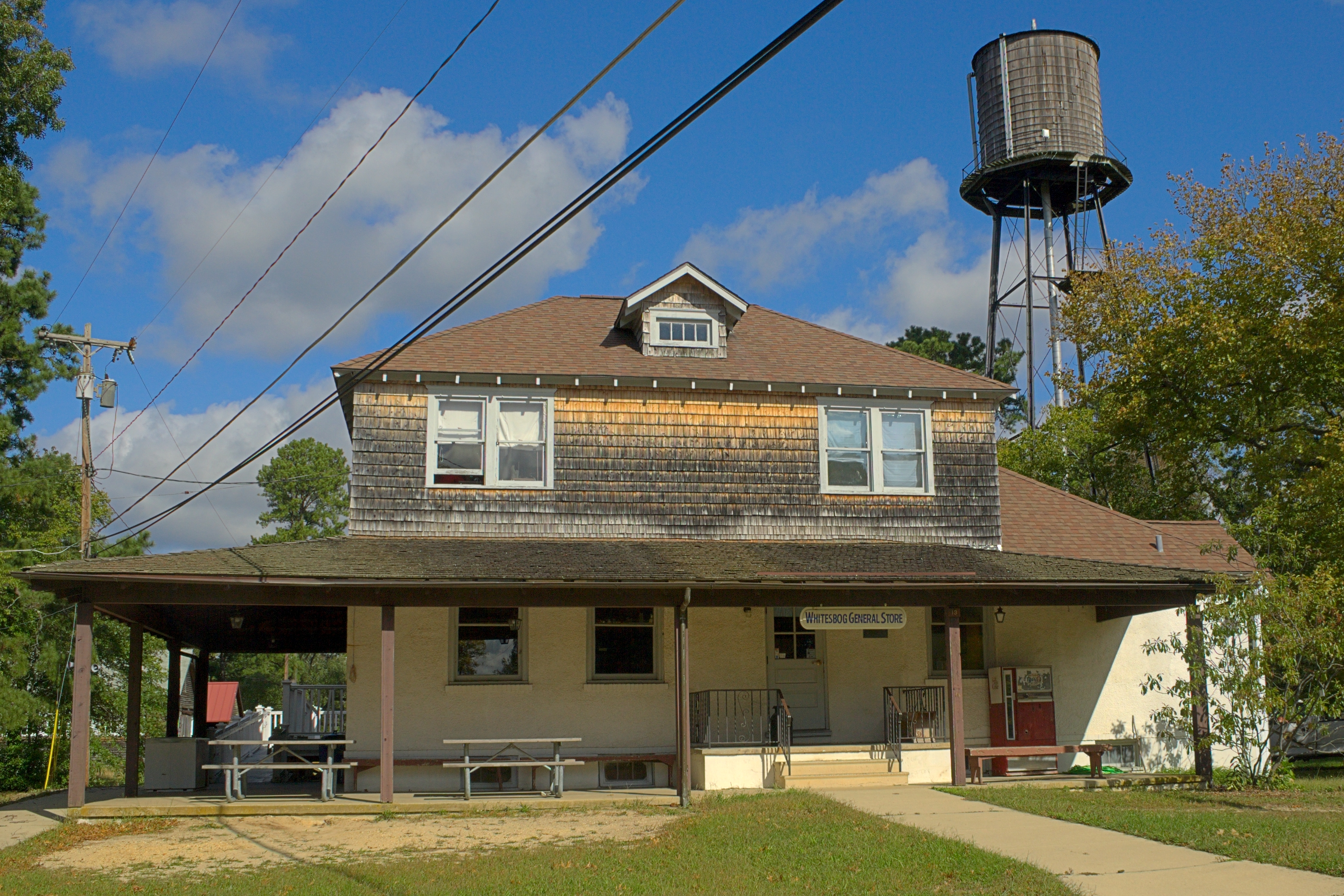
Whitesbog General Store

The forest also contains Whitesbog Village, a historic company town, founded in the 1870s by Joseph J. White which was once one of the largest cranberry and blueberry farms in the state, active through the mid-20th century. The cultivated blueberry, a hybrid of the native Vaccinium caesariense, was developed and commercialized here by Elizabeth Coleman White and Frank Coville. The now silent Whitesbog Village exemplifies the changes in agriculture in this state. The site has been leased to the nonprofit Whitesbog Preservation Trust for restoration.

== See also ==
- List of New Jersey state parks
