= Wharton State Forest =

Largest state forest in the U.S. state of New Jersey

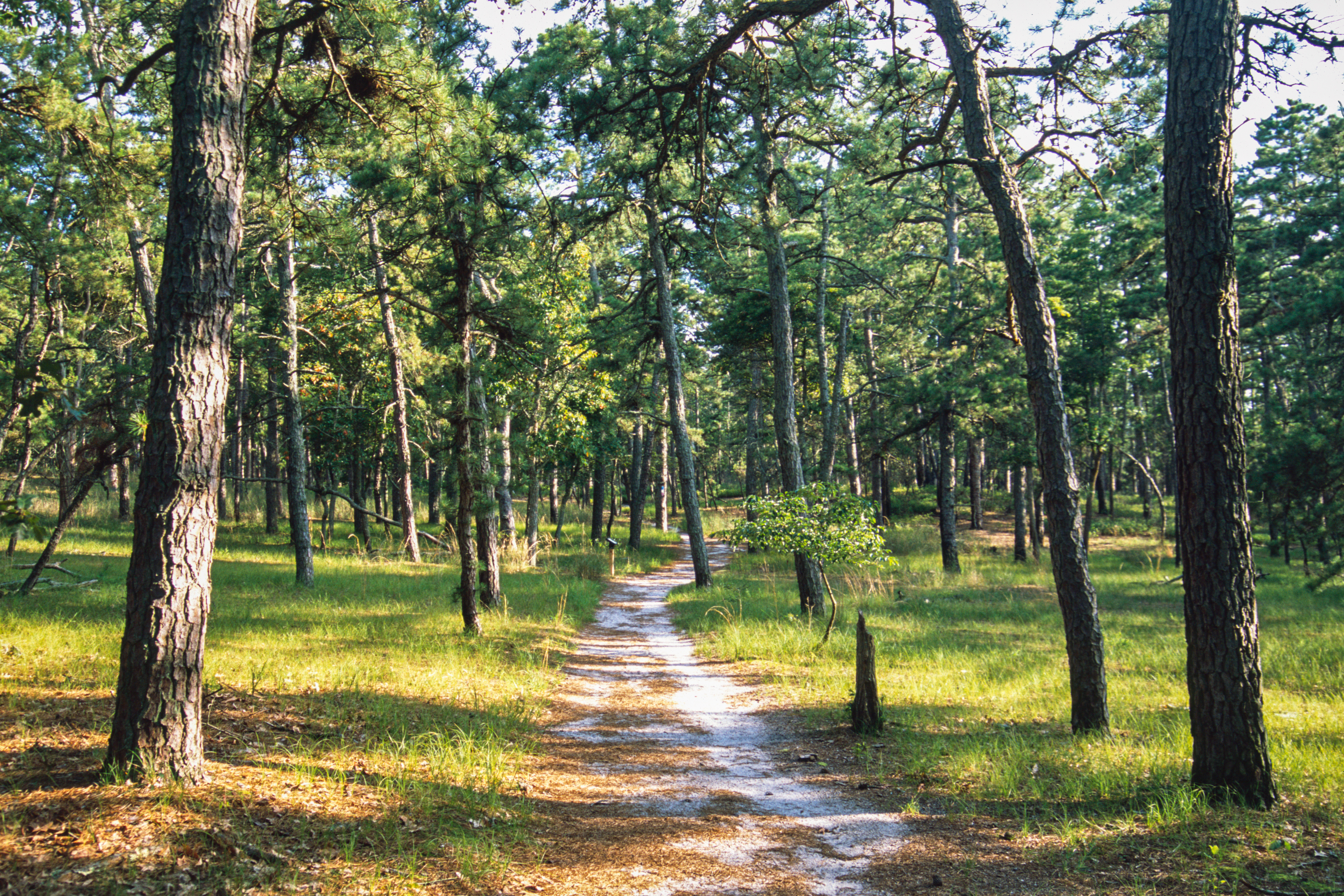
- Hiking trail near Batsto Village

- Location within New Jersey Location within the United States
- Location: Burlington, Camden, and Atlantic counties
- Coordinates: 39°38′38″N 74°38′48″W
- Area: 122,880-acre (497.3 km^{2})
- Opened: 1954
- Operator: New Jersey Division of Parks and Forestry
- Website: Official website

Interactive map of Wharton State Forest

Wharton State Forest is the largest state forest in the U.S. state of New Jersey. It is the largest single tract of land in the state park system of New Jersey, encompassing approximately 122,880 acres (497.3 km^{2}) of the Pinelands northeast of Hammonton. Its protected acreage is divided between Burlington, Camden, and Atlantic counties. The entire forest is located within the Atlantic coastal pine barrens ecoregion as well as the New Jersey Pinelands National Reserve. The forest is located in the forested watershed of the Mullica River, which drains the central Pinelands region into the Great Bay. The forest is under the jurisdiction of the New Jersey Division of Parks and Forestry.

The forest is also the location of the historic Batsto Village, a former bog iron and glass manufacturing site from 1766 to 1867. The forest includes extensive hiking trails, including a section of the Batona Trail, which connects the forest to nearby Brendan T. Byrne State Forest and Bass River State Forest. It also includes over 500 miles (800 km) of unpaved roads. The rivers, including the Mullica, are popular destinations for recreational canoeing.

The forest is named for Joseph Wharton, who purchased most of the land that now lies within the forest in the 19th century. Wharton wanted to tap the groundwater under the Pine Barrens to provide a source of clean drinking water for Philadelphia; however, the New Jersey Legislature quashed the plan by passing a law that banned the export of water from the state. The state bought the vast tract from Wharton's heirs in the 1950s.

== History ==
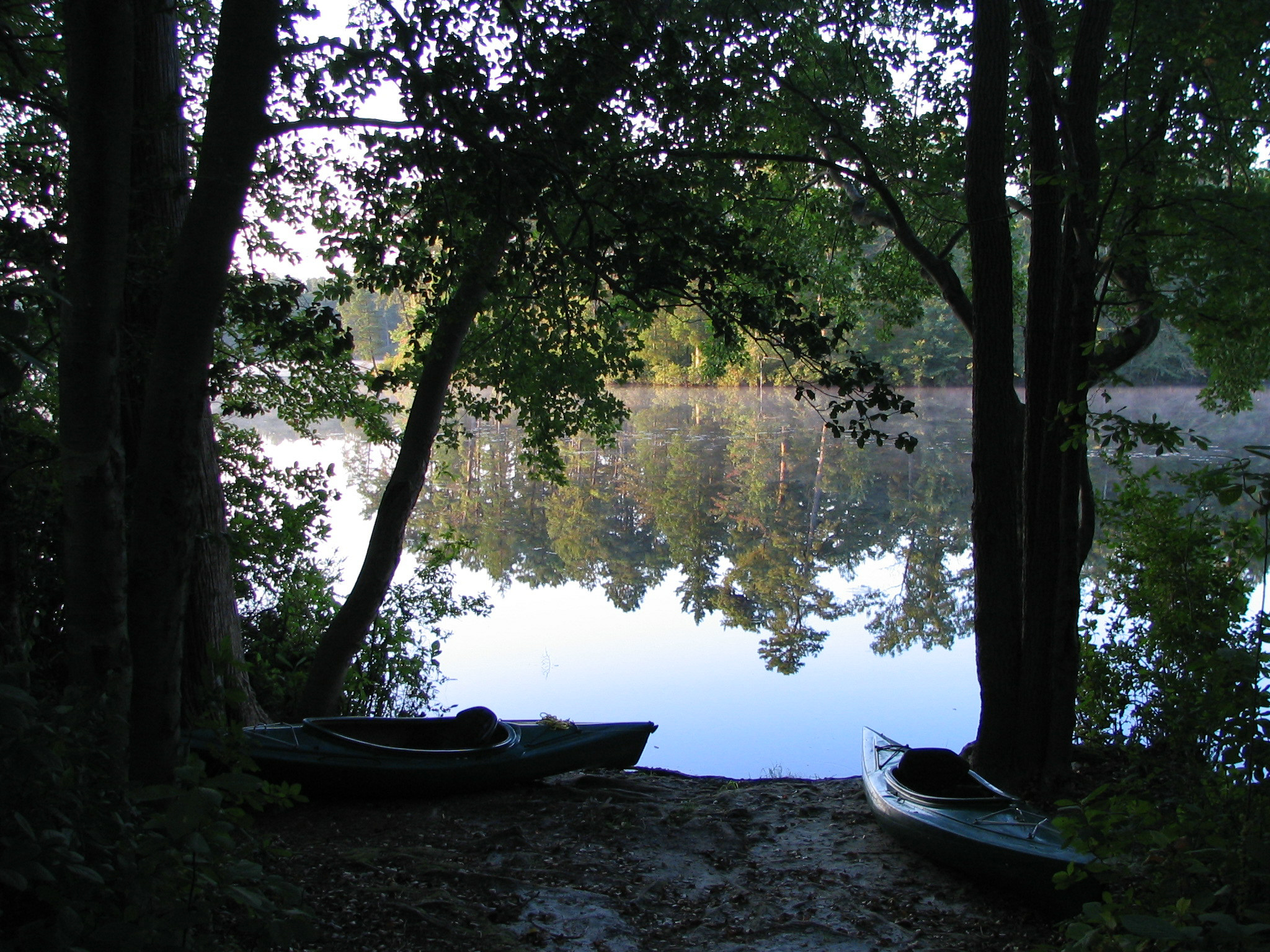
View from a campsite at Atsion Recreation Area

In the 1800s, various bog iron and paper industries developed in the New Jersey Pine Barrens. In 1873, Philadelphia industrialist Joseph Wharton began purchasing property and abandoned towns in the Pine Barrens, eventually acquiring about 100,000 acres (40,000 ha). Wharton planned to build dams to redirect freshwater to Philadelphia, but the plan was blocked by the New Jersey legislature in 1884, with a law that blocked transporting waters outside of the state. After Joseph Wharton died in 1909, his family estate tried selling his property to New Jersey for $1 million, which was defeated by a referendum in 1915. For the next few decades, the Wharton estate was managed by a trust company.

In the 1950s and 1960s, the federal government sought to build a 32,500 acres (13,200 ha) jetport in the Pine Barrens. To preserve the land of the Wharton estate, the New Jersey government purchased the lands containing large portions of the Mullica River in 1954, which was designated Wharton State Forest on December 30, 1954. New Jersey purchased additional land in 1956, totaling 96,000 acres (39,000 ha) in its entirety, for a sum of $3 million. To prevent additional development, local residents and farmers worked to preserve the Pine Barrens, eventually leading to the formation of the Pinelands National Reserve in 1978.

A large fire, dubbed the Mullica River Fire, broke out at the Wharton State Forest in June 2022.

== Atsion Mansion ==
Within the state forest, once a residence and cranberry packing facility, Atsion Mansion has been vacant since 1882. The mansion was constructed in 1826 by Samuel Richards, Ironmaster of the Atsion Iron Furnace & Forge. It was built as a summer residency and used by Richards until his death in 1842. In 1960, the building lost even more of its glory when its west porch was torn down. Under the guidelines of the State of New Jersey, area contractors Wu & Associates undertook the restoration of the site. The existing exterior stucco was removed and replaced with new material; the interior plaster, wood windows and shutter were restored; fireplace mantels, stone and wood floors in the basement, and the existing cedar roof were all repaired; and a new exterior sidewalk was added to a handicap ramp. The reconstruction of a western porch provided a historically accurate interpretation of the building to represent the way it was originally. The mansion is unique, in that the mansion is equipped with no electricity or indoor plumbing, allowing visitors to imagine how the Richards Family lived in the early 19th century.

== Inside Wharton ==
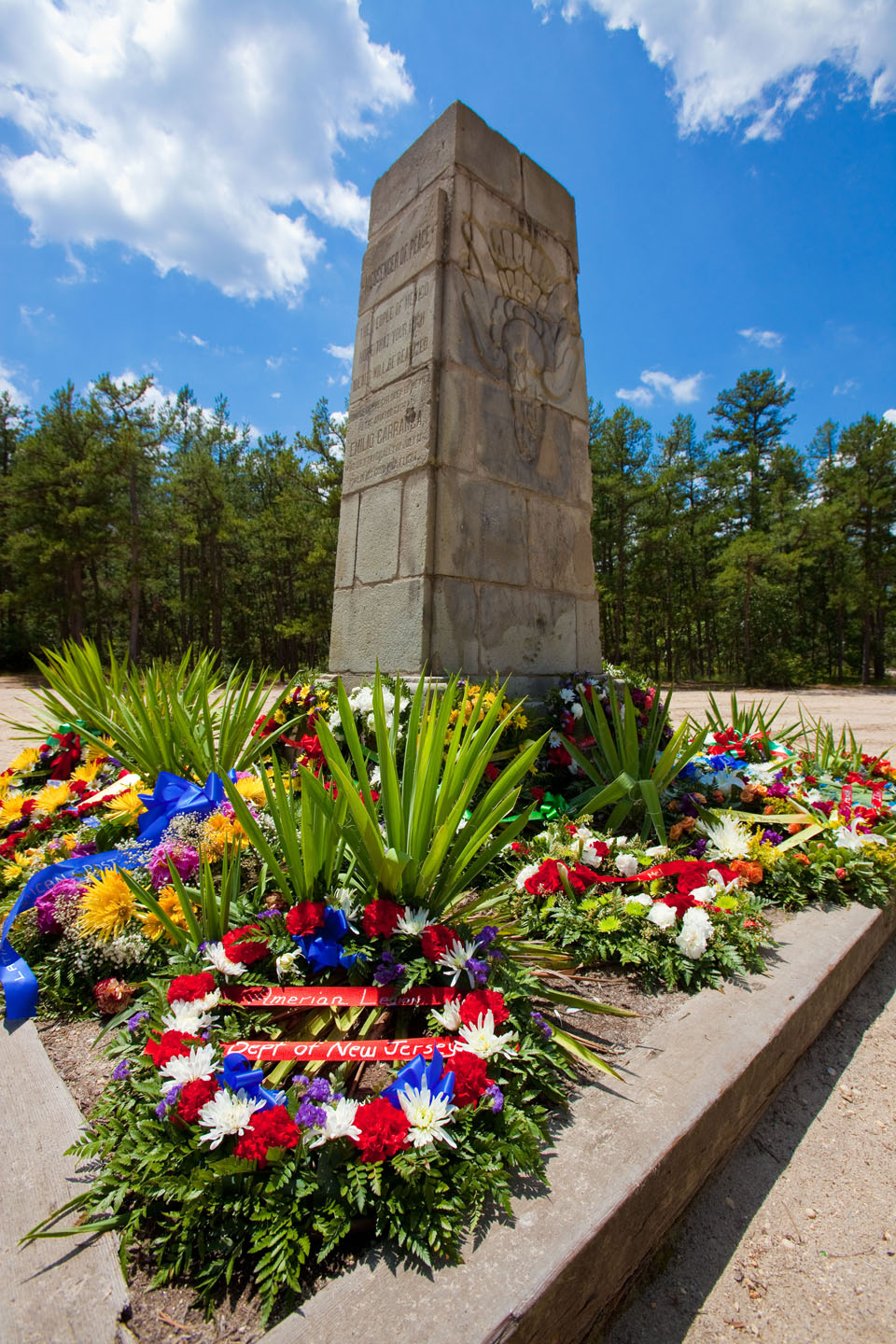
Carranza Memorial

A monument marks the location where Mexican aviation pioneer Emilio Carranza crashed on July 12, 1928 while attempting to fly his Ryan Brougham airplane, the Mexico Excelsior, non-stop from New York to Mexico City, final leg of a historic goodwill flight to the United States. The monument, installed with funds donated by Mexican schoolchildren, depicts a falling eagle of Aztec design. Every July on the Saturday nearest the anniversary of his crash (second Saturday in July) at 1:00 p.m. he is honored at the monument site by local residents and representatives from the Mexican consulates in New York City and Philadelphia.

The forest has ten campgrounds, ranging from family camping at Atsion Recreation Area, with showers and a guarded beach, to wilderness camping that can be reached only by hiking or canoe/kayak.

Apple Pie Hill is a popular hiking destination along the Batona Trail in the forest. The hill, topped with a 60 feet (18 m) New Jersey Forest Fire Service fire tower, provides impressive panoramic views across the Pinelands region.

== Flora ==
The flora of Wharton State Forest includes a variety of trees such as pitch pine, loblolly pine, pond pine, shortleaf pine, Atlantic white cedar, red maple, blackgum, magnolia, sweetgums, oaks, and sassafras. The forest floor is predominantly covered by bracken ferns.

== See also ==
- List of New Jersey state parks
