= Atsion =

Atsion may refer to:

- Atsion, New Jersey, an unincorporated community within Shamong Township, Burlington County
- Lake Atsion
