= Bass River (New Jersey) =

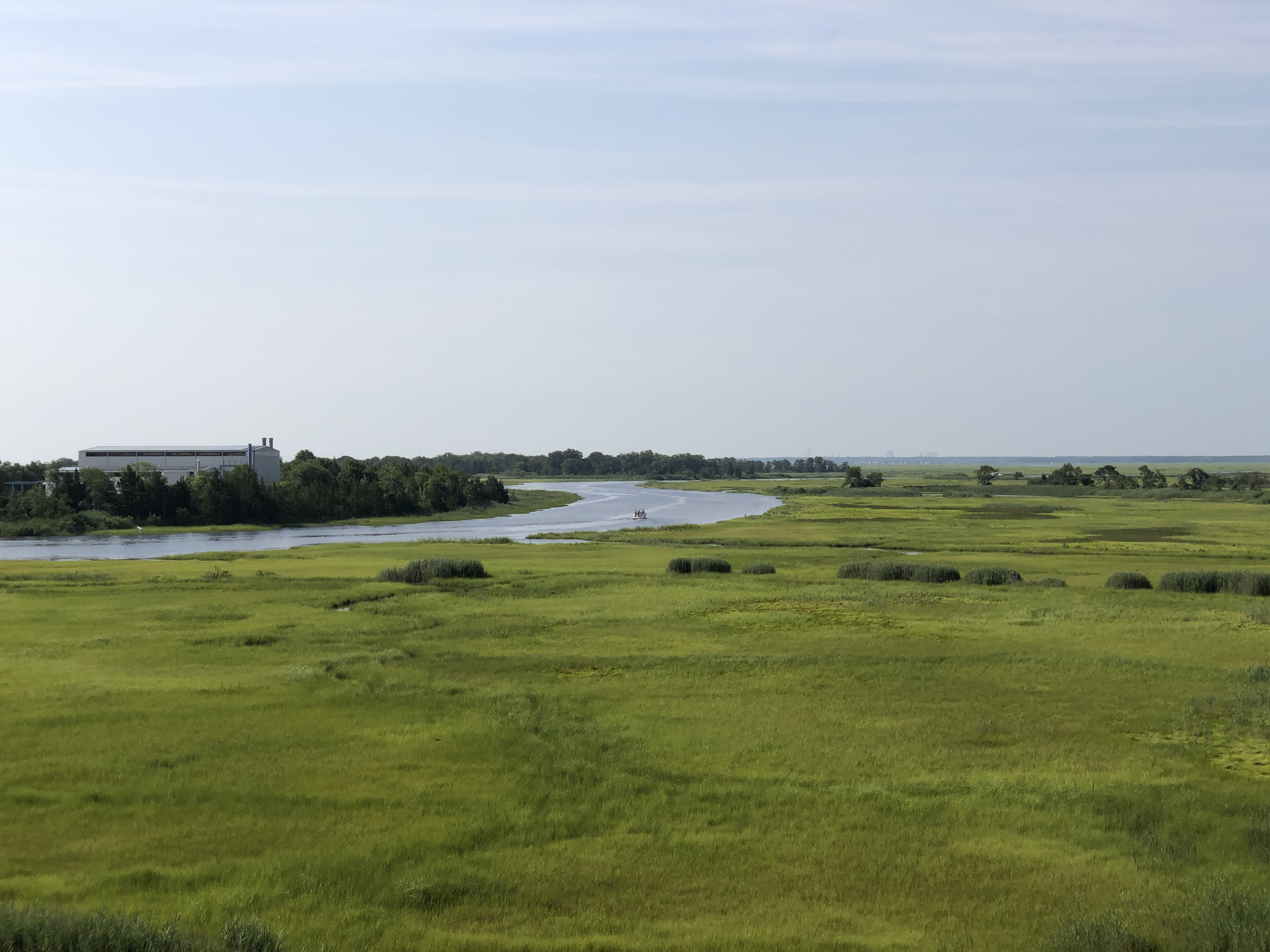
- Marshes along the lower Bass River, viewed from the Garden State Parkway

- Location within Burlington County, New Jersey
- Etymology: Jeremiah Basse

Location
- State: New Jersey
- County: Burlington County
- Town: Bass River

Physical characteristics
- Source: East Branch Bass River
  - location: Bass River State Forest, near Push Line
  - coordinates: 39.6494°N 74.4142°W
- 2nd source: West Branch Bass River
  - location: Bass River State Forest, near French Coal Road
  - coordinates: 39.6790°N 74.4234°W
- Mouth: Mullica River
  - location: Bass River, New Jersey
  - coordinates: 39.5607°N 74.4503°W
- Length: 4.7 miles (7.6 km)

Basin features
- Progression: Bass River→Mullica River→Great Bay→Atlantic Ocean
- River system: Mullica River Watershed
- Bridges: Garden State Parkway near MM 52.1

The Bass River is a 4.7-mile-long (7.6 km) tributary of the Mullica River in southeastern New Jersey in the United States.

The river is located primarily in Bass River, New Jersey, which was named for the river, which was in turn named for Jeremiah Basse, who served as governor of both West Jersey and East Jersey.

It rises in the Pinelands of southeastern Burlington County and flows generally south, through Bass River State Forest, and joins the Mullica from the north approximately 1 mile (1.6 km) upstream from its mouth on Great Bay. The lower 2 miles (3.2 km) of the river forms an arm of the estuary of the Mullica. The river is part of the watershed of the Mullica that drains an extensive unspoiled wetlands region of New Jersey. The majority of the land within the drainage basin is forested, and under state protection. Near the mouth and lower parts of the river, there is tidal influence.

== Tributaries ==
- Tommys Branch
- East Branch Bass River
- West Branch Bass River
- Dans Bridge Branch

== See also ==
- List of rivers of New Jersey
