= Pinelands National Reserve =

National reserve that encompasses the New Jersey Pine Barrens

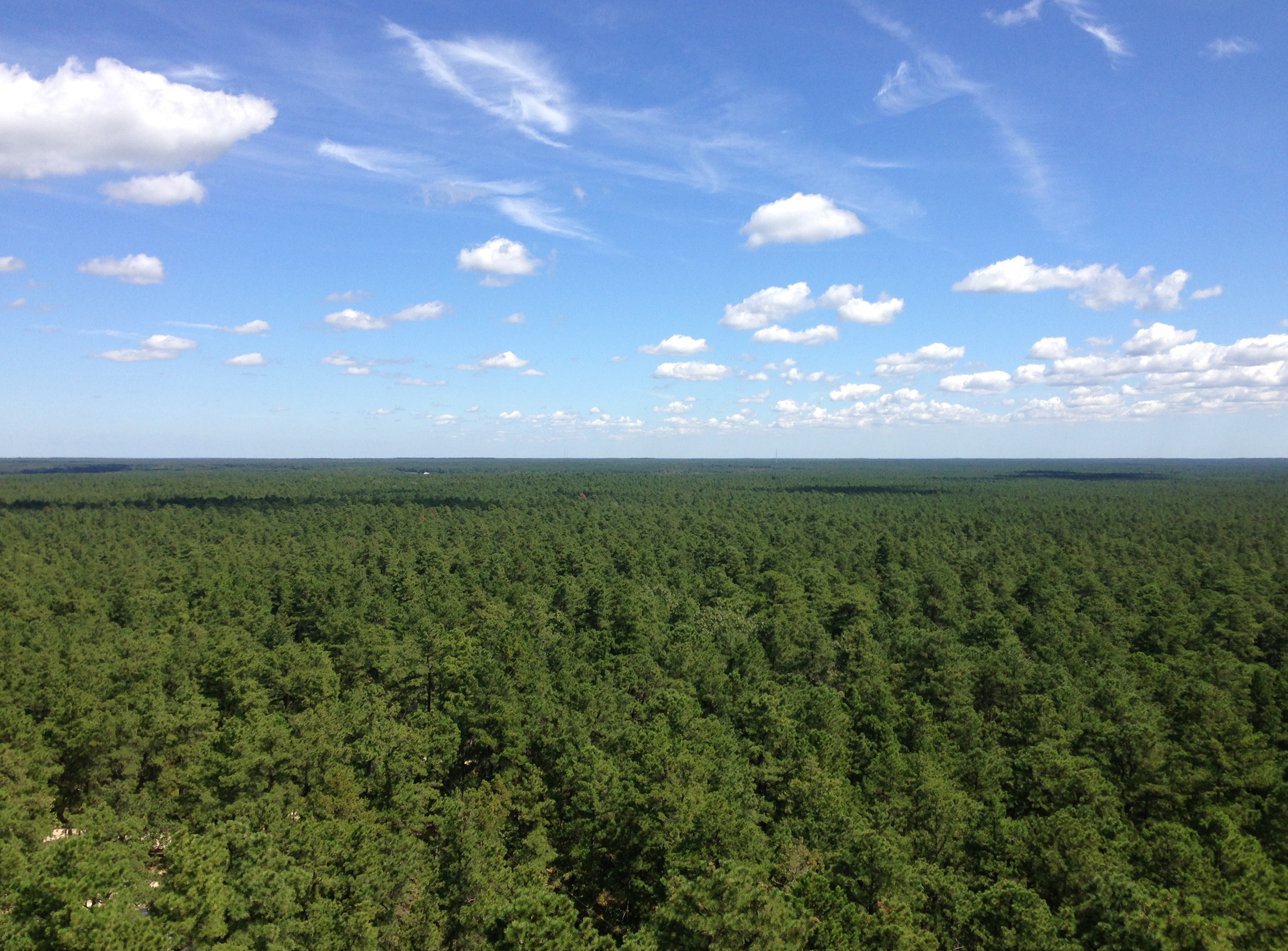
- View north-northeast from the fire tower on Apple Pie Hill in Wharton State Forest, Tabernacle Township, New Jersey

- Location within New Jersey Location within the United States
- Location: New Jersey, U.S.
- Nearest city: Hammonton, NJ
- Coordinates: 39°45′N 74°45′W
- Area: 1,164,025 acres (4,710.64 km^{2}); 90,530 acres (36,640 ha) federal
- Established: November 10, 1978
- Governing body: New Jersey Pinelands Commission
- Website: www.nps.gov/pine/index.htm

Interactive map of Pinelands National Reserve

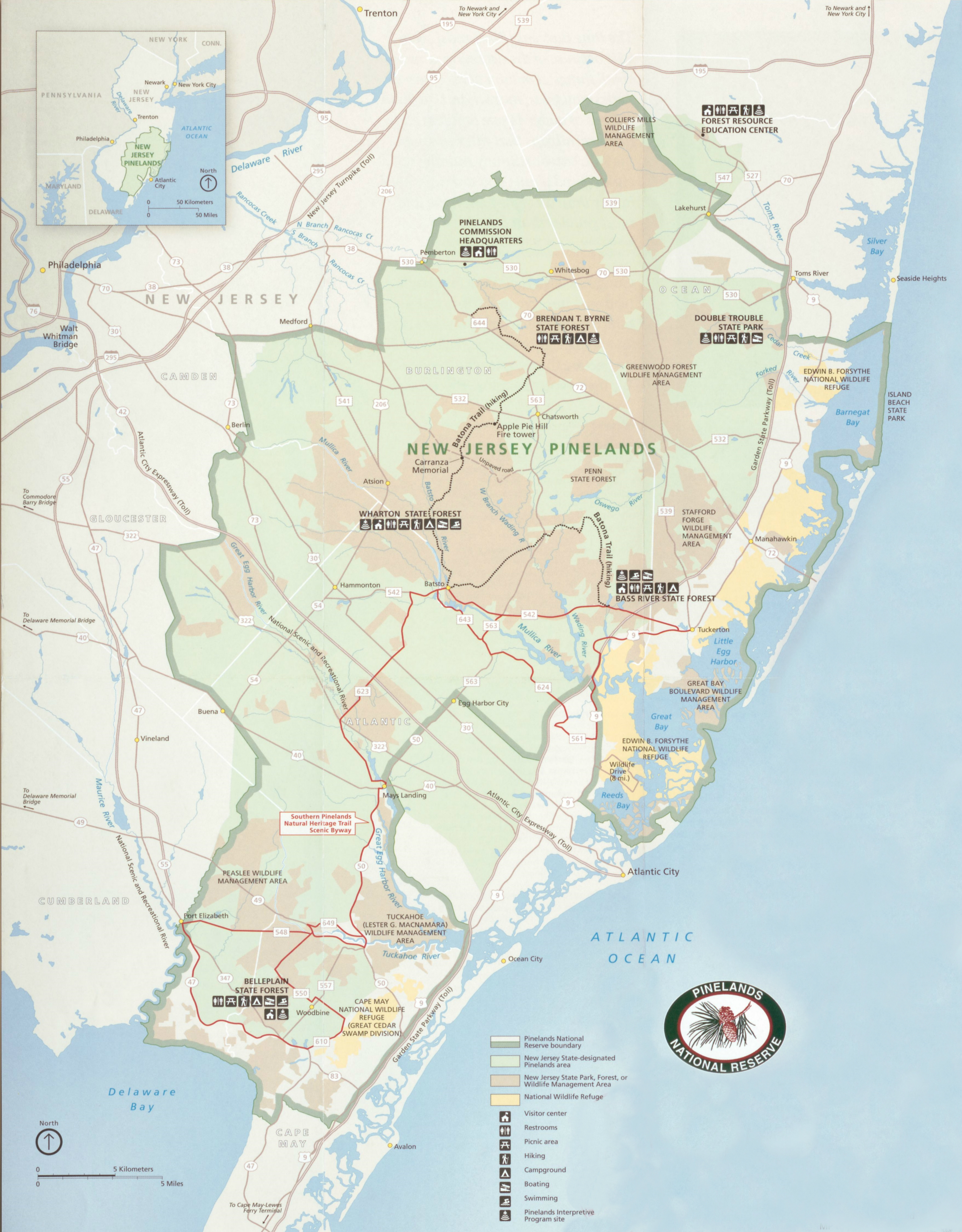
Pinelands map

Pinelands National Reserve is a national reserve that encompasses much of the New Jersey Pine Barrens. The Pinelands is a unique location of historic villages and berry farms amid the vast oak-pine forests (pine barrens), extensive wetlands, and diverse species of plants and animals of the Atlantic coastal pine barrens ecoregion. It is protected by state and federal legislation through management by local, state, and federal governments and the private sector. The reserve contains Wharton State Forest, Brendan T. Byrne State Forest, Bass River State Forest, Penn State Forest, and Double Trouble State Park, which provide public recreation facilities. Established by Congress in 1978, it is one of the nation's first national reserves, established along with Ebey's Landing National Historical Reserve.

== History ==
Between 170 and 200 million years ago, the Atlantic coastal plain began to form. The changing position of the coastline over millions of years deposited the minerals of the bedrock, culminating with the end of the last ice age about 12,000 years ago, after which plants and trees began to grow in what is now New Jersey. Around 10,000 years ago, the ancestors of the Lenape people first inhabited the Pine Barrens. During the 17th century, the area was explored and settled by the Swedish, Dutch, and English, eventually becoming a part of the U.S. state of New Jersey. Settlers in the region used the area's cedar, oak, and pitch trees, as well as local tar and turpentine, in sawmill, gristmill, and shipbuilding industries.

Efforts to protect the New Jersey Pine Barrens started in 1964, when the Pinelands Regional Planning Board proposed a "supersonic jetport" in Ocean County to alleviate flight traffic in the New York metro. This project would create a satellite city of about 250,000 people, and would cover about 50 sq mi (130 km^{2}) in ecologically sensitive parts of the Pine Barrens. The proposed airport generated public opposition and united conservation efforts among farmers, hunters, and environmentalists, who believed that the region was vulnerable to the spread of the urban sprawl of the northeastern United States. Due to the large size of the forest, as well as 300 years of human development, the area could not be protected and preserved in its entirety. The United States Department of the Interior worked with officials from New Jersey, as well as the state's Senate and Congressional delegation, to create a development management plan for the Pinelands. The main point of disagreement was the role of federal oversight.

On February 24, 1977, Senator Frank Church (D-ID) sponsored the National Parks and Recreation Act of 1978 as an Omnibus bill, which included legislation for the Pinelands National Reserve. New Jersey Representatives Edwin B. Forsythe and William J. Hughes proposed bills H.R. 9539 and H.R. 9539 to preserve the Pinelands, which became attached to the omnibus bill in an amendment, sponsored by Congressmen Forsythe, Hughes, and James Florio. The bill passed in the United States Senate on October 27, 1977. A similar bill passed in the House of Representatives on July 12, 1978. After further changes passed by both houses, United States President Jimmy Carter signed the National Parks and Recreation Act of 1978 on November 10, calling it "the most significant conservation legislation to pass the 95th Congress" in his signing statement. The National Parks and Recreation Act of 1978 created the Pinelands National Reserve, which consists of 1,100,000 acres (450,000 ha) of land in 56 South Jersey municipalities. It was the "largest tract of wild land along the Middle Atlantic Seaboard", according to President Carter's briefing on a September 20, 1978 trip to Atlantic City.

Upon the passage of the bill, the Pinelands National Reserve became the country's first National Reserve. The act authorized $23 million for land acquisition of critically important ecological areas. Congress noted the need for local, state, and federal government, along with the private sector, to collectively manage and preserve the water and land resources of the Pinelands, without large-scale direct federal acquisition of the land. The bill also directed for the Interior Secretary to request the state of New Jersey to establish "a planning entity to a comprehensive management plan for the Pinelands National Reserve." In accordance with the law, New Jersey Governor Brendan Byrne issued an executive order on February 8, 1979, creating the Pinelands Commission. This was affirmed by the New Jersey legislature in the Pinelands Protection Act, which passed in June 1979. The state Pinelands Area omitted 162,000 acres (66,000 ha) of National Reserve land east of the Garden State Parkway and near the Delaware Bay.

On August 8, 1980, the Pinelands Commission approved the Protection Area, an area of unbroken forest covering 39% of the National Reserve. For the remainder of the reserve, the Pinelands Commission created the Preservation Area on November 21, which consisted of towns, farmlands, and other areas. The plan became effective under state law on January 14, 1981, and two days later, Interior Secretary Cecil D. Andrus approved the Comprehensive Management Plan. In the same year, Rutgers University established the Rutgers Division of Pinelands Research to support local ecological research. In 1983, the United Nations Educational, Scientific and Cultural Organization (UNESCO) designated the Pinelands as a biosphere reserve, labeling it the South Atlantic Coastal Plain Biosphere Reserve/Pinelands National Reserve. In 1988, UNESCO redesignated it as a singular biosphere reserve.

== Comprehensive Management Plan ==
The text of the National Parks and Recreation Act of 1978 directed for the planning entity to develop a comprehensive management plan (CMP), which became effective on January 14, 1981. The Pinelands Commission set a one-year period from the effective date, with $600,000 provided by the New Jersey Legislature from 1980–1982, for municipalities and counties to conform to the standards of the CMP. In July 1981, New Hanover Township became the first municipality to have its master plan approved by the Pinelands Commission. In January 1982, after the one year approval period ended, the Pinelands Commission worked with the remaining municipalities and counties updating their master plans. For the towns that refused to comply, the commission announced it would implement the CMP, thus overseeing the local development approval process. In June 1982, Atlantic County sued the Pinelands Commission on behalf of Galloway Township, which wanted to opt out of the CMP; the New Jersey Appellate Court ruled on June 16 on behalf of the Pinelands Commission. A subsequent appeal by the county failed.

By December 1983, 70% of the municipalities within the Pinelands National Reserve had revised local master plans and met approval by the Pinelands Commission; by the same time, four out of seven counties developed master plans to focus growth in selected areas. In that same time period, 85% of all approved requests for property development occurred in regional growth areas.

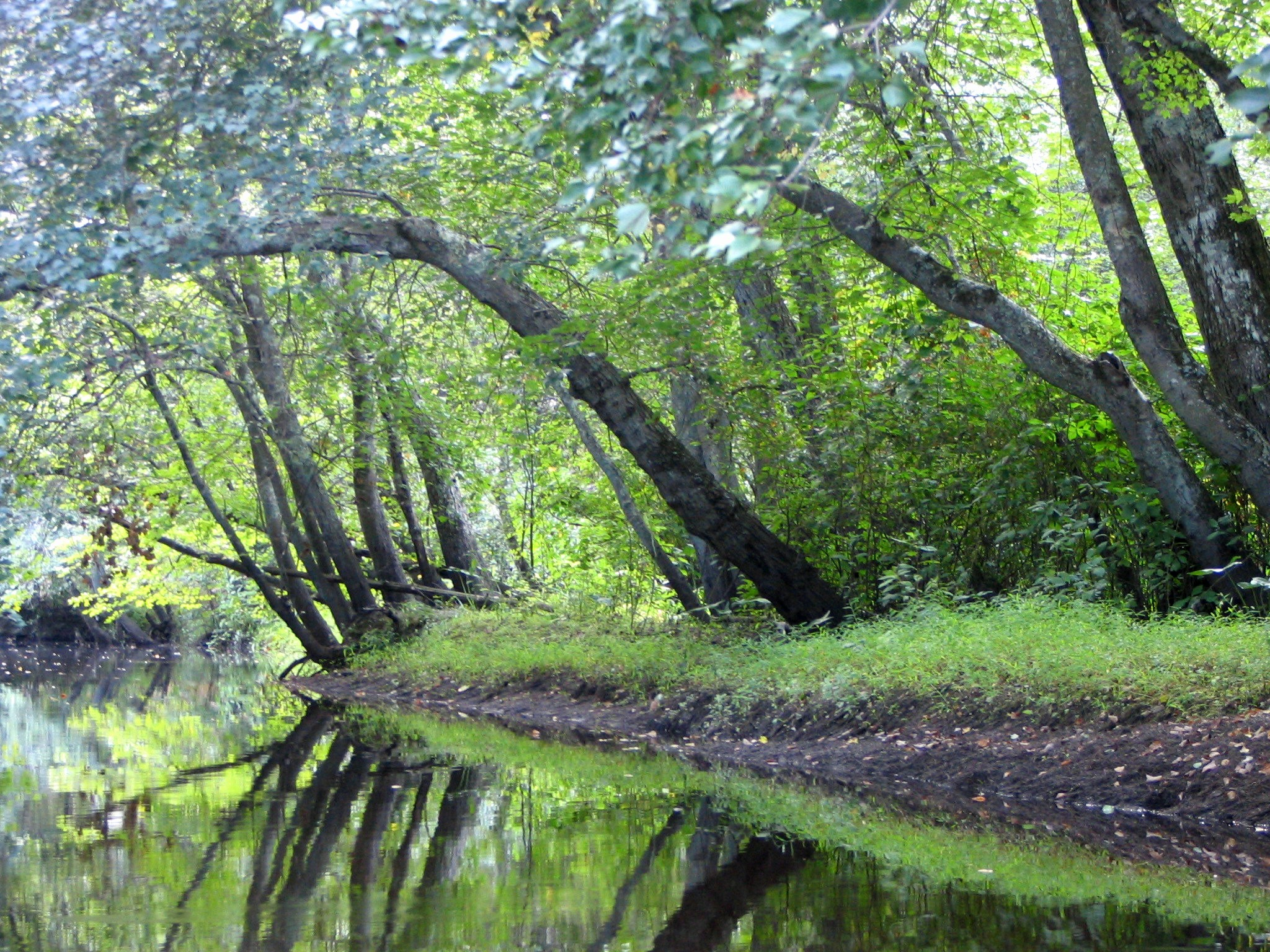
The Batsto River and oak trees in the New Jersey Pine Barrens.

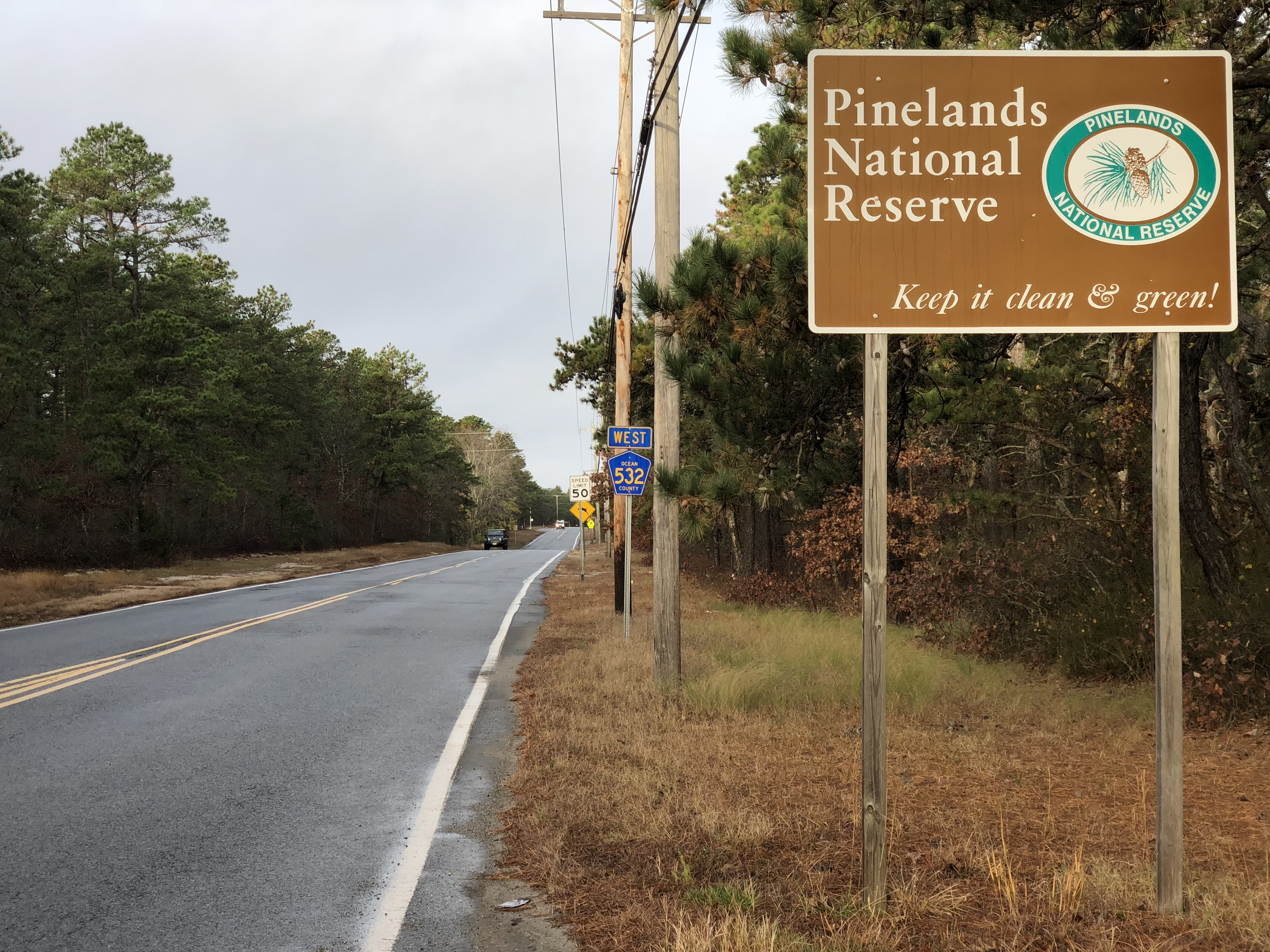
Sign marking the boundary of the reserve, this one on CR 532 in Ocean Township, Ocean County, New Jersey

== Pinelands Commission ==
The Pinelands National Reserve is administered by the Pinelands Commission, an independent body consisting of 15 members. One member is appointed by the Secretary of the Interior; seven are appointed by the Governor of New Jersey, subject to the approval of the New Jersey Senate; and one member is appointed by each of the governing bodies of the seven counties in the Pinelands National Reserve: Atlantic, Burlington, Camden, Cape May, Cumberland, Gloucester and Ocean. Commission terms are three years and include no official compensation. The commission meets monthly, as do most of its sub-committees.

Its mission statement indicates its role "is to preserve, protect, and enhance the natural and cultural resources of the Pinelands National Reserve, and to encourage compatible economic and other human activities consistent with that purpose."

== Geography and populated places ==
As legislated by the National Parks and Recreation Act of 1978, the Pinelands National Reserve consisted of about 1,140,000 acres (460,000 hectares) of pine-oak forest. The territory crosses seven counties and encompasses all or parts of 56 municipalities, with about 870,000 people as of the 2010 census. Included in the Pinelands National Reserve are 29 villages located in 16 municipalities, with 19 of the villages located in forest areas.

Within the Reserve is the Kirkwood-Cohansey aquifer, which contains over 17 trillion gallons of water requiring continued protection from pollutants.

== Climate ==
According to the Köppen climate classification system, Pinelands National Reserve has two climate zones; warm summer humid continental (Dfb) in northern, central and western sections with humid subtropical (Cfa) in eastern and southern sections. Average annual snowfall totals increase from southeast to northwest and range from 15–22 inches (38–56 centimetres). According to the USDA, there are three plant hardiness zones; 6b with an average annual extreme minimum temperature of −5 to 0 °F (−21 to −18 °C) in interior sections away from the coast, 7a with an average annual extreme minimum temperature of 0 to 5 °F (−18 to −15 °C) north of Great Bay near the coast to south of Great Bay just inland from the coast, and 7b with an average annual extreme minimum temperature of 5 to 10 °F (−15 to −12 °C) south of Great Bay near the coast.

Climate data for 11 NE Hammonton, Wharton State Forest, Pinelands National Reserve, Burlington County, NJ.
Month	Jan	Feb	Mar	Apr	May	Jun	Jul	Aug	Sep	Oct	Nov	Dec	Year
Mean daily maximum °F (°C)	42.0 (5.6)	45.3 (7.4)	52.8 (11.6)	64.0 (17.8)	73.8 (23.2)	82.5 (28.1)	86.7 (30.4)	85.2 (29.6)	78.8 (26.0)	67.7 (19.8)	57.4 (14.1)	46.4 (8.0)	65.3 (18.5)
Daily mean °F (°C)	32.7 (0.4)	35.2 (1.8)	42.3 (5.7)	52.4 (11.3)	62.0 (16.7)	71.2 (21.8)	75.9 (24.4)	74.4 (23.6)	67.5 (19.7)	56.1 (13.4)	46.8 (8.2)	37.0 (2.8)	54.5 (12.5)
Mean daily minimum °F (°C)	23.4 (−4.8)	25.1 (−3.8)	31.8 (−0.1)	40.9 (4.9)	50.2 (10.1)	59.9 (15.5)	65.1 (18.4)	63.5 (17.5)	56.1 (13.4)	44.5 (6.9)	36.3 (2.4)	27.7 (−2.4)	43.8 (6.6)
Average precipitation inches (mm)	3.49 (89)	2.81 (71)	4.39 (112)	3.94 (100)	3.90 (99)	3.84 (98)	4.38 (111)	4.41 (112)	3.81 (97)	3.55 (90)	3.46 (88)	3.88 (99)	45.86 (1,165)
Average relative humidity (%)	64.9	62.1	58.8	59.0	62.9	67.5	68.3	70.5	70.8	69.6	67.7	67.4	65.8
Source: PRISM Climate Group

Month	Jan	Feb	Mar	Apr	May	Jun	Jul	Aug	Sep	Oct	Nov	Dec	Year
Average Dew Point °F	22.2	23.5	28.9	38.5	49.2	59.9	64.7	64.2	57.7	46.3	36.7	27.2	43.3
Average Dew Point °C	-5.4	-4.7	-1.7	3.6	9.6	15.5	18.2	17.9	14.3	7.9	2.6	-2.7	6.3
Source: PRISM Climate Group

== Biology and ecology ==
The Pinelands feature the largest areas of forest along the East Coast of the United States between northern Maine and the Florida Everglades. There are 580 native species of plants, 54 of which are threatened or endangered. As of 2018, the Pinelands Reserve hosts 299 species of bird, 91 of fish, 59 of reptile or amphibian, and 39 species of mammal. In 2015, a new lichen species, Lecanora layana, was discovered in the Pinelands National Reserve. According to the text of the act passed by Congress, the ecological diversity "provides significant ecological, natural, cultural, recreational, educational, agricultural, and public health benefits."
