= Penn State Forest =

State park in Burlington County, New Jersey

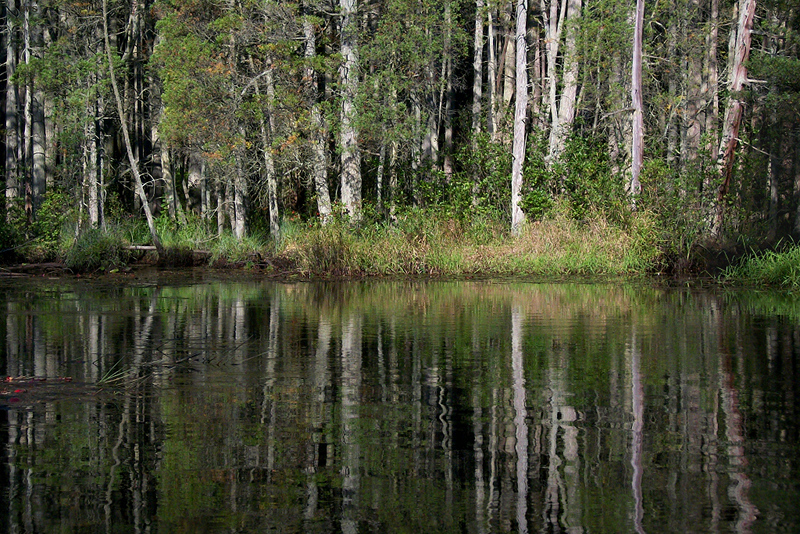
- Atlantic white cedars along the banks of the Oswego River

- Location within the United States Location within New Jersey
- Location: Burlington County, New Jersey
- Nearest town: Jenkins Neck and Chatsworth
- Coordinates: 39°44′4.9″N 74°29′28.82″W
- Area: 3,366 acres (5.259 sq mi)
- Created: 1910
- Operator: New Jersey Division of Parks and Forestry
- Website: Official website

Penn State Forest is a 3,366-acre (5.259 sq mi) state park in Burlington County, New Jersey, United States. The forest is protected as a section of the environmentally sensitive Pine Barrens. Various recreational resources are available to visitors including Oswego Lake and the Oswego River for boating and fishing. The lake has a picnic area with a boat launch and primitive restrooms. Miles of unpaved roads composed of gravel, dirt, and sand traverse all areas of the forest. The roads are open for hiking, mountain biking, horseback riding, and cross-country skiing, as well as four-wheel driving. Hunting for deer, wild turkey, water fowl, and small game is permitted in season. A section of the Pine Barren Plains, a globally rare dwarf forest ecosystem that reaches a mature canopy height of about 4 ft (1.2 m), is located in the northeastern portion of the park. Penn State Forest is operated and maintained by the New Jersey Division of Parks and Forestry.

The nearest settled areas include the unincorporated communities of Jenkins Neck in Washington Township to the southwest, Chatsworth in Woodland Township to the northwest, and Warren Grove, Manakawkin and Long Beach Island in Ocean County to the east-southeast. The northern section of Bass River State Forest is located to the north while the easternmost portions of Wharton State Forest and the main portion of Bass River State Forest are located to the south.

The first recorded inhabitants of the area were a branch of the Lenape tribe of Indians. Europeans built a small settlement called Penn Place on the Oswego River in the 19th century. The state purchased the land in 1910 and created what was initially called Penn Reserve. The Civilian Conservation Corps began building the park's gravel roads in 1933. A large-scale military exercise involving a division of army troops from Fort Dix participated in a mock invasion in 1941, prior to the US entry to World War II. Penn State Forest served as the temporary division headquarters during the exercise. In 1971, a supersonic jet on military bombing practice runs crashed through the park's fire lookout tower creating a 1 mi (1.6 km) long path of destruction.

From the 1950s to the 1970s, many proposals for a massive jetport spanning much of Burlington County failed to materialize due to increasing environmental concerns. In 1978, the federal government designated the New Jersey Pinelands National Reserve, further protecting Penn, Wharton, and Byrne state forests as well as all the surrounding Pine Barrens from future development efforts.

== History ==
The area was occupied by a branch of the Lenape tribe of Native Americans when the first European settlers arrived in the early 19th century. The Lenape left behind evidence of their passing in the form of shell middens from the shellfish they had consumed. A small village named Penn Place, consisting of just five buildings by the mid-1860s, was constructed by the settlers along the upper Oswego River. The village was named for a Penn family member who had, according to legend, previously resided in the area at some time in the 18th century; however, the first man named Penn to settle there was James Penn, who was the son of a sea captain named William Penn (a different man than the founder of Philadelphia and Pennsylvania). James Penn's descendants may have remained in the area until about 1890. Edwin Pue and his wife acquired the land and sold it to the state in 1910—the state's fifth acquisition for its park system.

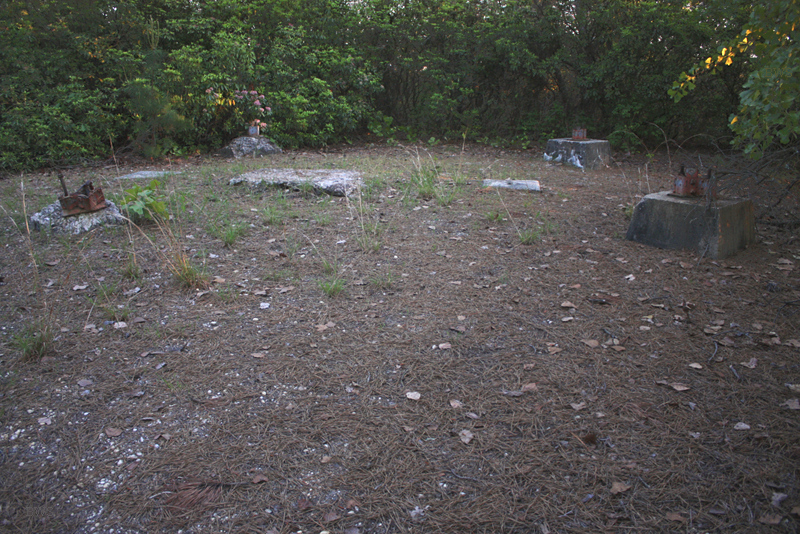
Foundations of fire lookout tower on the summit of Bear Swamp Hill

In 1912, the state ran a 9 mi (14 km) telephone line across what was initially called Penn Reserve. A wooden fire lookout tower was constructed on Bear Swamp Hill (elevation 165 ft (50 m)) in 1915. After the wooden tower burnt down, a modern fire lookout tower was built in 1960. That tower was destroyed when a plane crashed through it in 1971. An Air National Guard pilot named William F. Dimas, flying from McGuire Air Force Base, crashed during practice bombing runs in a supersonic F-105 Thunderchief over the Warren Grove Gunnery Range, which is adjacent to the state forest. The crash killed the pilot and destroyed about 1000 trees along a path about 40 ft (12 m) wide and 1 mi (1.6 km) long.

The first Civilian Conservation Corps enlistees arrived in 1933 and worked on road construction. The CCC workers at Penn State Forest consisted solely of African Americans since construction crews were segregated during that era. The CCC camp area is located to the northeast of Oswego Lake.

In the spring of 1941, prior to the US entry to World War II, a five-day military exercise involving 16,000 army troops from Fort Dix participated in a mock invasion that occurred near the coastal areas of the state. Penn State Forest served as the temporary division headquarters during the exercise.

In the late 1950s, a large airport was proposed by Burlington County officials to be constructed in the Pine Barrens, mainly to serve New York and Philadelphia. The airport would have spanned from Penn State Forest to Vincentown, a distance of about 20 mi (32 km), including parts of the Wharton and Brendan T. Byrne (formerly, Lebanon) state forests. The plan included filling in Oswego Lake to make it a runway as just one small part of a supersonic jetport with four times the combined capacity of Newark, LaGuardia, and JFK airports. Eventually, environmental concerns about the project led to the federal protection of the Pine Barrens as a National Reserve in 1978, after airport proposals that had lasted for two decades.

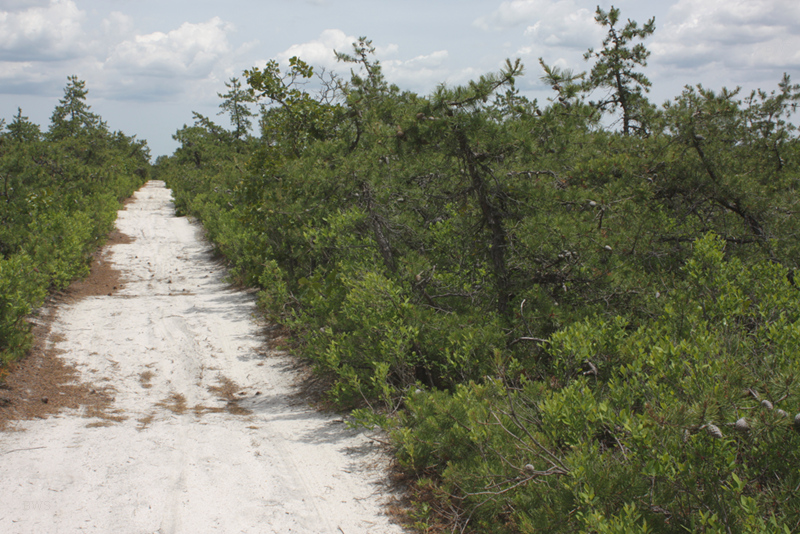
Road through the Pine Barren Plains, east of Spring Hill

== The Pine Barren Plains ==
The park preserves an area known as the Pine Barren Plains—also called the Pine Plains or the Pygmy Forest—a globally rare stunted forest ecosystem that reaches a mature canopy height of only about 4 ft (1.2 m). New Jersey contains the world's largest acreage of this type of dwarf forest, including areas both within and outside the Penn State Forest. The trees are mainly pitch pine and blackjack oak in the northeastern portion of Penn State Forest. Researchers have speculated that the trees evolved to their short statures due to a combination of droughts, nutrient deficiencies, relatively higher-speed winds due to higher elevations than their surroundings, and more than twice as many wildfires as other areas within the Pine Barrens.

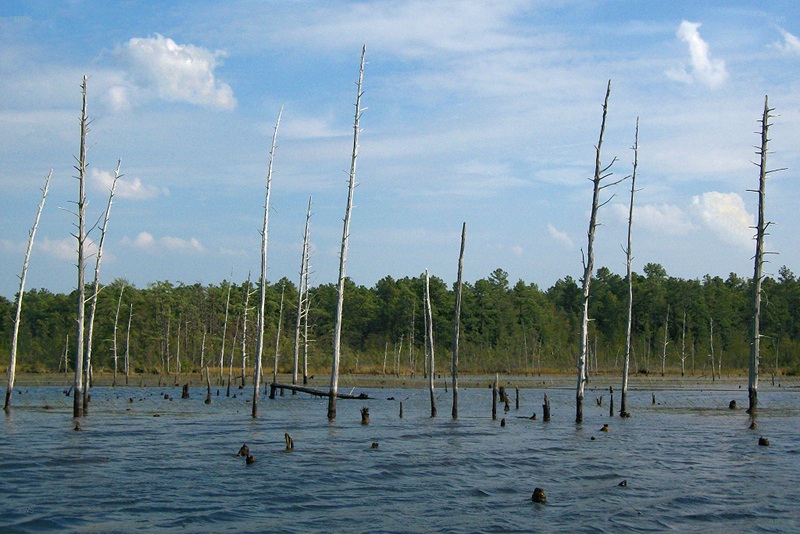
Partially submerged trees near the eastern edge of Oswego Lake

== Oswego Lake ==
Oswego Lake, a 90-acre (0.14 sq mi) artificial lake created in 1942 by a dam on the Oswego River, provides opportunities for boating and fishing. The lake functions as a reservoir for cranberry farms located downstream along the Oswego River. The upper stretches of the generally slow-flowing Oswego River, along the Papoose Branch at the east end of the lake, can be explored by canoe and kayak. Canoeists and kayakers can also head south out of the park along the Oswego River to Harrisville Lake by portaging around the dam.

== See also ==
- List of New Jersey state parks
