= Howard P. Boyd =

American biologist and educator (1914–2011)

- Born: November 2, 1914; Boston, Massachusetts, U.S.
- Died: December 20, 2011 (aged 97); Pinelands National Reserve, Tabernacle Township, New Jersey, U.S.
- Education: Boston University, University of Delaware
- Known for: Tiger Beetles, New Jersey Pine Barrens
- Awards: Premiere inductee, 2004, Pine Barrens Hall of Fame
- Scientific career
- Fields: ecologist, botanist, entomology

Howard P. Boyd (November 2, 1914 – December 20, 2011) was an American entomologist best known for his close association with the New Jersey Pine Barrens spanning more than 70 years.

== Background ==
Boyd was born in Boston, Massachusetts, in 1914. He attended the University of New Hampshire for two years before transferring to Boston University, where he received a B.S. in botany in 1938. He then obtained an M.S. in entomology from the University of Delaware in 1979.

== Career ==
Shortly after his graduation from Boston University, Boyd went to work for the Boy Scouts of America (BSA), moving with his wife, Doris (nee Fowler), to the Philadelphia area in 1938. He had his first exposure to the New Jersey Pine Barrens through numerous insect collecting trips in the fall of that year. In 1969, after 31 years as an executive with BSA, he retired, at which time he became increasingly active in his two primary areas of interest: the Pine Barrens and entomology.

Beginning in 1974, he spent nearly 30 years as the editor of the serial scientific publication, Entomological News, published by the American Entomological Society (AES), and he served as president of the AES from 1977 to 1981. For much of his adult life he was considered one of the U.S.'s leading experts on tiger beetles, a significant focus of his entomological research. He served as vice president and executive board member of the New Jersey Audubon Society (NJAS) from 1975 to 1983, and as chair of NJAS's Advisory Committee for the Rancocas Nature Center, which he helped establish, from 1977 to 1980. He was president of the Burlington County Natural Sciences Club from 1988 to 1990. Beginning in 1989 he served as a trustee of PPA.

In 1980, Boyd was presented with the Paul S. Battersby Award by the Audubon Wildlife Society. In 1989, he was presented with the Silver Beaver Award by the Camden County Council, BSA. In 2002, he was presented with the Medal of the Garden Club of New Jersey (GCNJ), the organization's highest honor. In 2004, he was one of two premiere inductees into the Pine Barrens Hall of Fame, established by PPA to honor heroes of Pine Barrens protection.

Howard and Doris Boyd, who predeceased him in 2009 at age 94, were married for over 70 years and were survived by two children, five grandchildren, and eleven great-grandchildren. The couple were longtime residents of Tabernacle, New Jersey, Burlington County, within the Protection Area of the Pinelands National Reserve. He died on December 20, 2011.
