= New Jersey Pine Barrens =

Coastal pine barrens in southern New Jersey, United States

Coordinates: 39°45′N 74°45′W

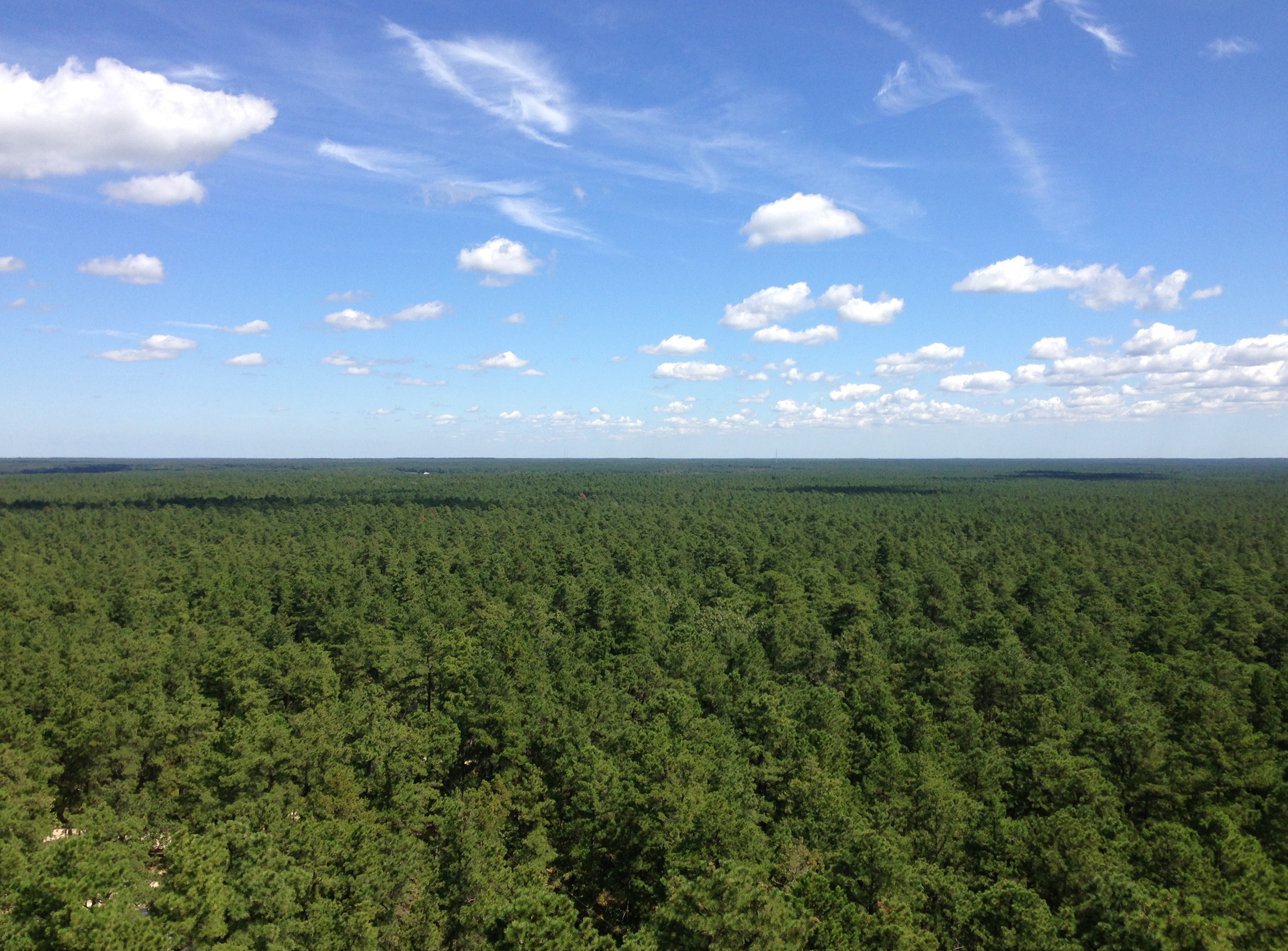
View north from a fire tower on Apple Pie Hill in Wharton State Forest, one of the highest points in the New Jersey Pine Barrens

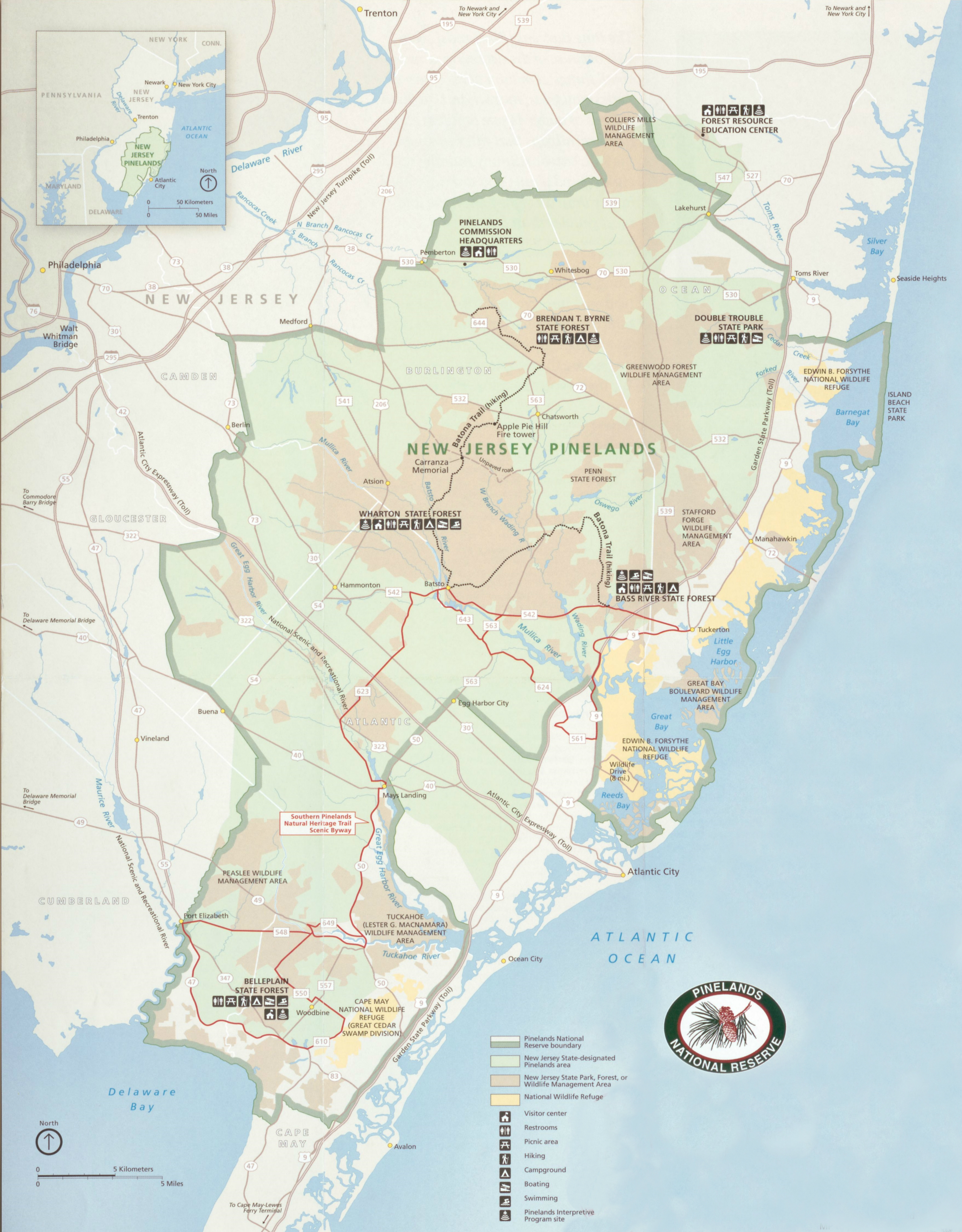
Pinelands National Reserve map. The preserve does not encompass the entire ecoregion.

The New Jersey Pine Barrens, also known as the Pinelands or simply the Pines, is the largest remaining example of the Atlantic coastal pine barrens ecosystem, stretching across more than seven counties of New Jersey. Two other large, contiguous examples of this ecosystem remain in the northeastern United States: the Long Island Central Pine Barrens and the Massachusetts Coastal Pine Barrens. The name pine barrens refers to the area's sandy, acidic, nutrient-poor soil. Although European settlers could not cultivate their familiar crops there, the unique ecology of the Pine Barrens supports a diverse spectrum of plant life, including orchids and carnivorous plants. The area is also notable for its populations of rare pygmy pitch pines and other plant species that depend on the frequent fires of the Pine Barrens to reproduce. The sand that composes much of the area's soil is referred to by the locals as sugar sand.

The Pine Barrens remains mostly rural and undisturbed despite its proximity to the sprawling metropolitan cities of Philadelphia and New York City, in the center of the very densely populated Boston-Washington Corridor on the Eastern Seaboard. The heavily traveled Garden State Parkway and Atlantic City Expressway traverse sections of the eastern and southern Pine Barrens, respectively. The Pine Barrens territory helps recharge the 17-trillion-U.S.-gallon (64×10^{9} m^{3}) Kirkwood–Cohansey aquifer, containing some of the purest water in the United States.

As a result of all these factors, in 1978, Congress passed legislation to designate 1.1 million acres (4,500 km^{2}; 1,700 mi^{2}) of the Pine Barrens as the Pinelands National Reserve (the nation's first National Reserve) to preserve its ecology. A decade later, it was designated by the United Nations as an International Biosphere Reserve. Development in the Pinelands National Reserve is strictly controlled by an independent state/federal agency, the New Jersey Pinelands Commission.

The Pinelands Reserve contains the Wharton, Brendan T. Byrne (formerly Lebanon), Penn, and Bass River state forests. The reserve also includes two National Wild and Scenic Rivers: the Maurice and the Great Egg Harbor.

John McPhee's 1967 book The Pine Barrens focuses on the history and ecology of the region.

== History ==
=== Prehistoric ===
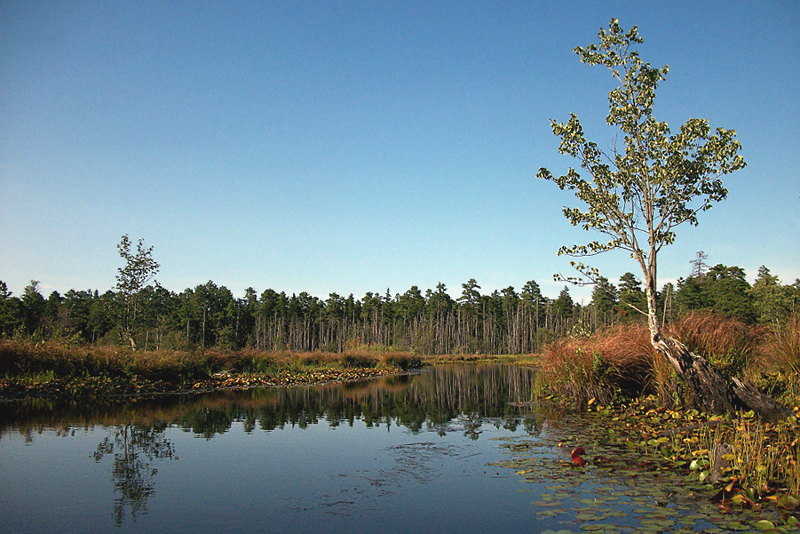
Large open area with beaver dams on the Mullica River southeast of Lake Atsion

The Barrens formed in the southernmost and newest land area in New Jersey 1.8 to 65 million years ago, during the Tertiary era.

Over millions of years, the rising and falling of the coastline deposited minerals underground, culminating with the end of the last ice age about 12,000 years ago, when plants and trees began growing in what is now New Jersey.

Forest fires have been a common occurrence since before habitation by humans. Fire has played a major ecological role in the Pinelands, and the ecotypes "suggest that short fire intervals may have been typical in the Pine Plains for many centuries, or millennia."

=== Pre-Columbian ===
Around 10,000 years ago, the ancestors of the Lenape people first inhabited the Pine Barrens.

The fire regime before European settlement is poorly understood. Scholars know that the Lenape tribes burned the woods in the spring and fall to reduce underbrush and improve plant yields and hunting conditions. The Pine Barrens, with its sandy soil, did not attract a permanent agriculture population (whose main interest would have been to establish permanent boundaries and clear the forests for fields). The area's sparse population encouraged a long-lasting attitude that forest fires should be set for local benefit—even on the lands of others. For instance, it was profitable for charcoal burners to set fires deliberately, in order to make the trees useless for any purpose other than charcoal making, then purchase the trees for a discount.

=== European settlement ===
During the 17th century, the area that is now New Jersey was explored and settled by the Swedish and Dutch, who developed whaling and fishing settlements mainly along the Delaware River. The English claimed the area as of 1606 under their London Company, and the Dutch abandoned their claim to the English in 1664. The first shipbuilding operations began in the Pine Barrens in 1688, utilizing the cedar, oak, and pitch trees, as well as local tar and turpentine. The first sawmills and gristmills opened around 1700, leading to the first European settlements in the Pinelands.

During the colonial era, the Pine Barrens was the location of various industries. In 1740, charcoal operations began in the Pine Barrens, and the first iron furnace opened in 1765. Bog iron was mined from bogs, streams, and waterways, and was worked in about 35 furnaces including Batsto, Lake Atsion, Hampton Furnace in Shamong, Hanover Furnace in Pemberton, Ferrago in Lacey, and several other locations. Iron from these early furnaces was instrumental in supplying the American military with weapons and camp tools during the American Revolution, the War of 1812, and the Second Barbary War. For example, Commodore Stephen Decatur Jr. sailed to Algiers armed with 24-pound cannons that had been cast at Hanover in 1814.

The first Indian reservation in the Americas was founded on the Brotherton tract of land, in 1758, in what is now Indian Mills in Shamong Township. On October 6, 1778 during the American Revolutionary War, 400 British troops under Patrick Ferguson fought an American force under Casimir Pulaski at the Battle of Chestnut Neck before burning several local buildings. In 1799, the first glassworks opened in Port Elizabeth, and by that time, whaling operations had stopped. The first cotton mill in the Pine Barrens opened in 1810 at Retreat. Cultivated cranberry bogs begin in the 1830s, and in 1832, the first paper mill opened in the region. In 1854, the first railroad across the Pinelands opened, connecting Camden and the newly-established Atlantic City. Railroads soon connected the various small towns that existed across the Pine Barrens.

In 1869, the bog iron industry ended in the Pine Barrens, after the discovery that iron ore could be mined more cheaply in Pennsylvania. Other industries such as paper mills, sawmills, and gristmills rose and fell throughout the years, catering chiefly to local markets. Smaller industries such as charcoal-making and glassmaking also were developed, meeting with varying degrees of success. Over time, however, the forest reclaimed almost all traces of the Pine Barrens' industrial past. Ghost towns—remnants of villages built around these former industries—can still be found at various locations. Batsto Village has been restored to its mid-19th century state as a state historic site.

=== The Kallikak study ===
The Pine Barrens were home to many rural, backwoods families. For years, residents of the rural area were called "Pineys" by outsiders, as a derogatory term. Today many Pinelands residents are proud of both the name and the land on which they live. In the early 20th century, a family identified in a case study by the pseudonym, the Kallikaks, were presented as an example of genetic inferiority by eugenicists.

=== Aviation accidents ===
On July 12, 1928, the Mexican aviator and national hero Emilio Carranza crashed and was killed in Tabernacle, New Jersey, while returning from a historic goodwill flight from Mexico City to the United States. Flying back from Long Island, he encountered a thunderstorm and crashed in Burlington County. A 12 ft (3.6 m) monument identifies the location of the crash.

=== Efforts to preserve the Pine Barrens ===
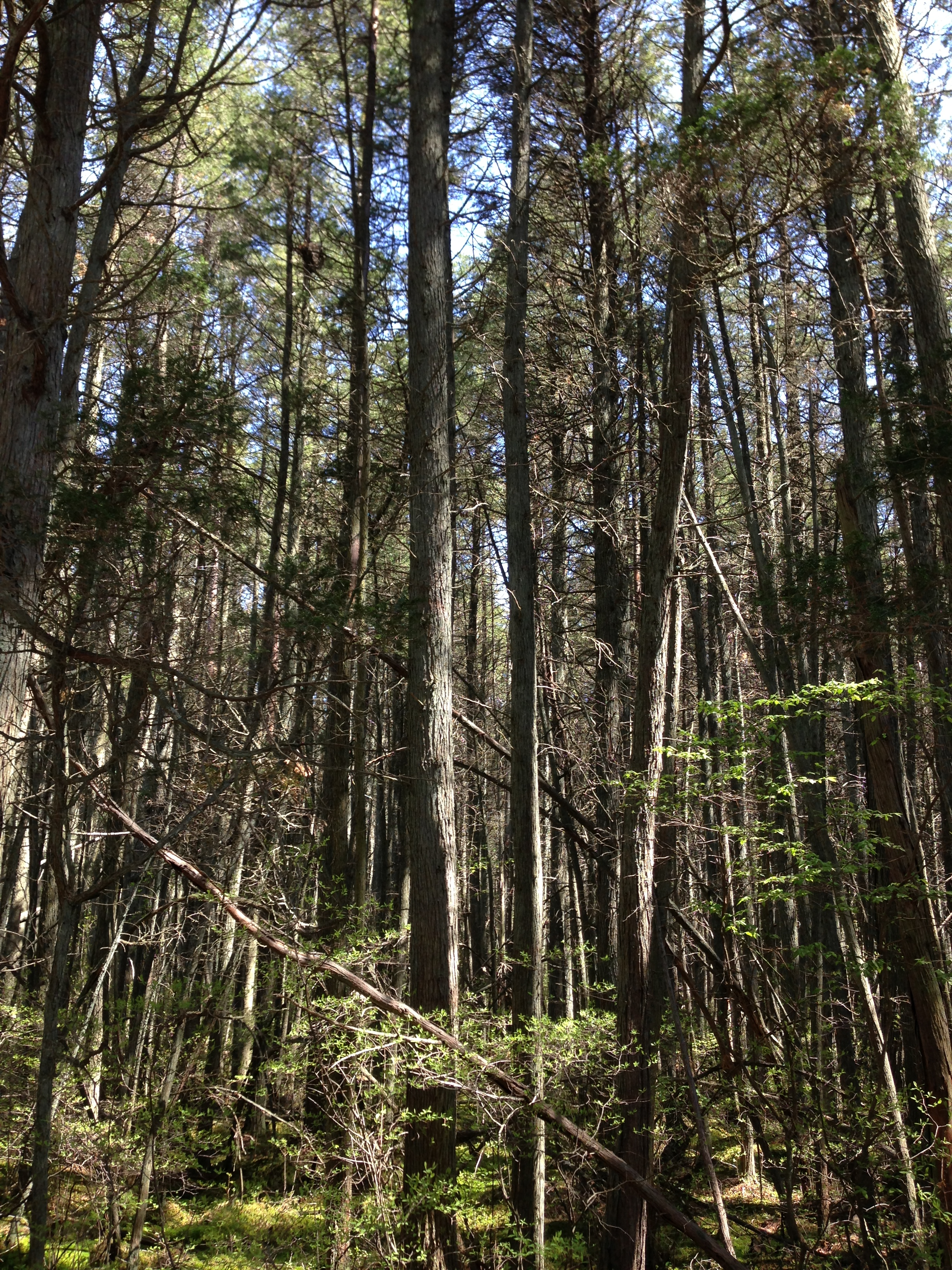
A dense Atlantic white cedar swamp in the New Jersey Pine Barrens

Despite rapid urbanization of surrounding areas, the Pine Barrens remained largely untouched because its sandy soil was unsuitable for growing most crops. Its iron and charcoal deposits did not compete with more readily accessible deposits elsewhere. In 1969, the Pine Barrens averaged a density of 15 inhabitants per square mile (5.8/km^{2}), compared with 1,000 inhabitants per square mile (390/km^{2}) in the lands bordering it. With rising environmental concerns at the time, people became alerted to the possible destruction of the Pine Barrens and its aquifer by urban sprawl.

State authorities in the region discussed plans to construct a jetport and associated city in the Pine Barrens to alleviate congestion at other major regional airports of the Mid-Atlantic. The low cost of land and lower incidence of fog in the area made the plan appealing.

Congress created the New Jersey Pinelands National Reserve, the country's first National Reserve, to protect the area under the National Parks and Recreation Act of 1978.

The surviving Medford office of Dr. James Still, the 19th century "Black Doctor of the Pines", was purchased for preservation by the State of New Jersey in 2006. Today it is the Dr. James Still Historic Office Site and Education Center.

The reserve contains Wharton State Forest, Brendan T. Byrne State Forest, Bass River State Forest, and Penn State Forest. The Pinelands was designated a U.S. Biosphere Reserve by UNESCO in 1983 and an International Biosphere Reserve in 1988.

Howard P. Boyd was instrumental in working to preserve the Pine Barrens and educate visitors. He died in December 2011, within the Protection Area of the Pinelands National Reserve.

== Folklore ==
The Pine Barrens gave rise to the legend of the Jersey Devil, said to have been born in 1735 to a local woman named Mrs. Leeds in an area known as Leeds Point. It was said that he was her 13th child and, because of the unlucky number, he was cursed. Another story says that the mother gave birth to a hideous monster that attacked her and her nurses, before flying up and out of the chimney and disappearing into the Barrens. The Devil is said to roam the Pine Barrens, with many sharing stories of encounters with the Devil during dark nights in the Pinelands.

Pine Barrens folklore also includes the ghost of the "Black Doctor", the ghost of Captain Kidd, the "Black Dog", and various other ghosts, as well as folklore associated with the Blue Hole and other so-called "blue holes" in the Pine Barrens.

== Geography ==
The New Jersey Pinelands National Reserve contains approximately 1.1 million acres (4,500 km^{2}) of land, and occupies 22% of New Jersey's land area, including territory of much of seven counties. Counties affected by the act are Atlantic, Burlington, Camden, Cape May, Cumberland, Gloucester and Ocean. The Pine Barrens comprise a major part of the Atlantic coastal pine barrens ecoregion.

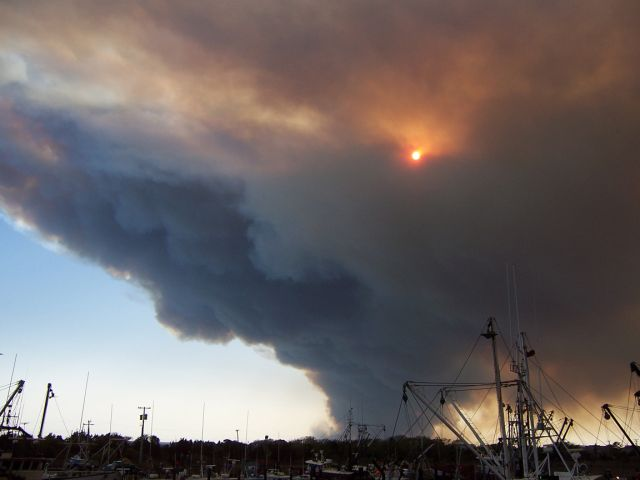
The 2007 forest fire viewed from Barnegat Light

Although natural fires have occurred, evidence shows that most fires in the region are of human origin.

== Climate ==
The Pine Barrens of New Jersey are in the transition zone between humid subtropical and humid continental climates. The Pine Barrens, however, have a microclimate that allows for a shorter frost-free season, and colder nighttime temperatures compared to most of New Jersey. Because of sandy soil and very little development, clear and calm nights can get much colder in the Pine Barrens than in the surrounding areas. On an average night, a 6 to 8 °F (3.3 to 4.4 °C) difference is commonly seen, but the change can be as much as 10 °F (5.6 °C).

The Pine Barrens receives annual snowfall, varying from 15 to 21 inches (380 to 530 mm) throughout the Pinelands (the northern pinelands receive the most snowfall, on average). Summers are typically hot and humid, and winters are typically cold, and fall/spring are milder transition seasons. Frost can be seen in fall, spring, and winter. In the Pine Barrens, frost occurs earlier in the fall and later in the spring than the surrounding areas due to the sandy soil.

The average annual precipitation in the Pinelands is from 42 to 46 inches (1,100 to 1,200 mm), but year-to-year precipitation varies greatly. Thunderstorms are frequent in the warmer months, along with strong winds and heavy rains from these storms.

Climate data for 7 mi NNE Batsto Village, Wharton State Forest, Burlington County, NJ (1981 – 2010 averages).
Month	Jan	Feb	Mar	Apr	May	Jun	Jul	Aug	Sep	Oct	Nov	Dec	Year
Mean daily maximum °F (°C)	42.1 (5.6)	45.3 (7.4)	52.9 (11.6)	64.1 (17.8)	73.9 (23.3)	82.5 (28.1)	86.6 (30.3)	85.2 (29.6)	78.8 (26.0)	67.8 (19.9)	57.4 (14.1)	46.3 (7.9)	65.3 (18.5)
Daily mean °F (°C)	32.7 (0.4)	35.2 (1.8)	42.2 (5.7)	52.4 (11.3)	62.0 (16.7)	71.2 (21.8)	75.8 (24.3)	74.3 (23.5)	67.4 (19.7)	56.0 (13.3)	46.8 (8.2)	36.9 (2.7)	54.5 (12.5)
Mean daily minimum °F (°C)	23.4 (−4.8)	25.1 (−3.8)	31.6 (−0.2)	40.8 (4.9)	50.1 (10.1)	59.8 (15.4)	65.0 (18.3)	63.4 (17.4)	56.0 (13.3)	44.3 (6.8)	36.1 (2.3)	27.5 (−2.5)	43.7 (6.5)
Average precipitation inches (mm)	3.50 (89)	2.82 (72)	4.40 (112)	3.94 (100)	3.92 (100)	3.82 (97)	4.38 (111)	4.43 (113)	3.80 (97)	3.51 (89)	3.45 (88)	3.84 (98)	45.81 (1,166)
Average relative humidity (%)	64.7	62.1	59.0	58.8	62.9	67.3	68.3	70.5	71.1	69.6	67.5	67.4	65.8
Source: PRISM Climate Group

Month	Jan	Feb	Mar	Apr	May	Jun	Jul	Aug	Sep	Oct	Nov	Dec	Year
Average Dew Point °F	22.1	23.5	28.9	38.4	49.2	59.8	64.6	64.1	57.7	46.2	36.6	27.1	43.3
Average Dew Point °C	0.4	1.8	5.7	11.3	16.7	21.8	24.3	23.5	19.7	13.3	8.2	2.7	12.5
Source = PRISM Climate Group

== Ecology ==
The New Jersey Pine Barrens is one of the most ecologically distinctive regions in the northeastern United States, characterized by its nutrient-poor, sandy soils, extensive forests of pitch pine and oak, and a high concentration of rare and endangered species. It forms the core of the New Jersey Pinelands National Reserve, the first national reserve in the United States, established to protect its unique ecological and cultural landscape.

=== Flora ===
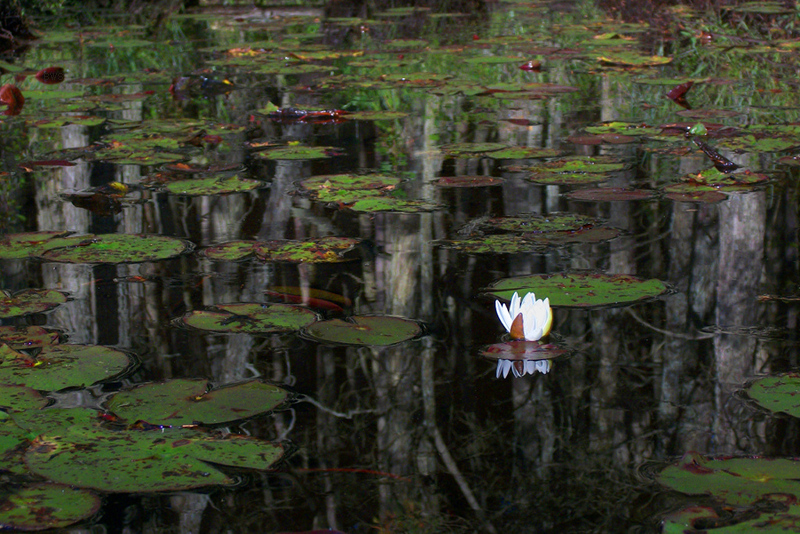
Water lily and reflected Atlantic white cedar trunks on the Oswego River

The Pine Barrens is home to at least 850 species of plants, of which 92 are considered threatened and endangered. Several species of orchids, including the pink lady's slipper, are native to the Pine Barrens. The region hosts more than 20 species of wild berries, including wild raisin, red chokeberry, highbush blueberry, huckleberry, bearberry, and cranberry.

The forest communities are strongly influenced by fire, varying from dwarf pine forests less than 4 feet (120 cm) tall where fires are frequent, to pine forests, to oak forests where fires are rare. Dark swamps of Atlantic white cedar grow along the waterways.

Forest fires play an important role in regulating the growth of plants in the Pine Barrens. Frequent light fires tend to reduce the amount of undergrowth and promote the growth of mature trees. Forest fires have contributed to the dominance of pitch pine in the Pine Barrens. They can resist and recover quickly from fire by resprouting directly through their bark, an unusual trait among pines. Their serotinous pine cones open only after having been heated by a fire. Pitch pines also grow serotinous cones that open after being exposed to fire. As such, frequent killing fires keep an area covered with small sprouts.

Periodic wildfires prevent succession into oak-dominated forests. Controlled burns are used as a conservation tool to maintain habitat diversity, reduce fuel loads, and support rare species dependent on open-canopy conditions.

Efforts to battle forest fire attract debate over how to best preserve the Pine Barrens. While fires constitute a danger to property and inhabitants, preservationists argue that eliminating forest fires would cause the Pine Barrens to become dominated by oak trees. A few areas which had previously consisted of scrub and pitch pine have become dominated by oak trees because of intervention after settlement to reduce the frequency of forest fires.

A distinct plant community consists of pygmy pine plains, a dwarf forest found on especially nutrient-poor, dry soils. Trees here rarely exceed a few feet in height due to fire, wind, and poor soil.

=== Fauna ===
The Pine Barrens is home to at least 39 species of mammals, over 300 species of birds, 59 reptile and amphibian species, and 91 fish species. At least 43 species are considered threatened and endangered by the NJ Division of Fish and Wildlife, including the rare eastern timber rattlesnakes (Crotalus horridus) and bald eagles.

American black bears are finding their way back into the Pine Barrens after a history of hunting and trapping had driven them out.

Believed to have been extirpated from the state by 1970 due to destruction of its territory and human encroachment, the bobcat gained legal protection in 1972. It is classified as a game species with a closed season; in 1991 it was added to the list of endangered species in New Jersey. Between 1978 and 1982, the state introduced 24 bobcats from Maine into the northern portion of the state. Since 1996, they have been monitored by biologists with the aid of GPS transmitters in order to determine habitat ranges and preferences.

A scent-post survey in 1995 proved bobcat presence in four northern counties. There have been reliable sightings of the bobcat in nine additional (mostly southern) counties, including those encompassing large swathes of the Pine Barrens and others skirting it, namely: Atlantic, Burlington, Cape May, Cumberland, Ocean, and Salem counties.

Bird life is abundant and includes red-headed woodpeckers, barred owls, and threatened species such as the bald eagle and red-shouldered hawk. Seasonal migrations also bring a diversity of warblers and other songbirds.

A threatened species of frog, the Pine Barrens tree frog, has a disjunct population there.

=== Wetlands and aquifers ===
Beneath the Pine Barrens lies the Kirkwood-Cohansey aquifer, an underground freshwater system estimated to hold over 17 trillion gallons of water. The aquifer feeds thousands of acres of wetlands, cranberry bogs, and rare habitat types such as vernal pools and Atlantic white cedar swamps.

The integrity of the aquifer and associated wetlands is essential to both the ecology and the economy of the region, especially for water-dependent agriculture like cranberries and blueberries.

=== Conservation status ===
Much of the Pine Barrens is protected under the Pinelands Protection Act (1979) and managed by the New Jersey Pinelands Commission. The region has also been designated a United States Biosphere Reserve by UNESCO due to its ecological significance. Ongoing conservation challenges include sprawl from urban development, illegal off-road vehicle use, and climate-related changes in fire and hydrology.

Conservation groups such as the Pinelands Preservation Alliance, local land trusts, and state and federal agencies actively manage and monitor the region to safeguard its biological and cultural resources.

== Economy ==
Industries in the Pine Barrens are primarily related to agriculture and tourism, though historically the region supported a number of extractive and manufacturing industries rooted in its natural resources.

=== Agriculture ===
New Jersey produces the third-highest number of cranberries in the country, mostly cultivated in the areas around Chatsworth, including Whitesbog. The first cultivated blueberries were developed in the Pine Barrens in 1916 through the work of Elizabeth White of Whitesbog, and blueberry farms are nearly as common as cranberry bogs in the area. Most blueberry farms are found in and around the town of Hammonton, which is often called the "Blueberry Capital of the World."

=== Tourism ===
Tourism is also a vital part of the regional economy. Visitors are drawn to the area's extensive hiking and canoe trails, historic villages, and farm-based attractions. Agritourism, such as cranberry and blueberry festivals, "pick-your-own" farms, and farm stands, helps sustain rural economies. Events like Hammonton's Red, White, and Blueberry Festival are major annual attractions.

=== Historical industries ===
Prior to the rise of modern agriculture and tourism, the Pine Barrens supported a range of industries based on its natural environment:

==== Iron production ====
During the 18th and early 19th centuries, the Pine Barrens was a significant center for bog iron production. Ironworks such as Batsto Village and Atsion smelted iron from the bogs using charcoal from local forests. This iron was used for domestic goods and Revolutionary War munitions.

==== Charcoal and glass ====
The dense pine forests provided abundant wood for charcoal, which fueled furnaces throughout the region. In addition, the sand of the Pine Barrens was suitable for glassmaking. Towns such as Weymouth and Alloway hosted small glass factories during the 19th century.

==== Cedar logging ====
Swamps in the Pine Barrens were rich in Atlantic white cedar. This rot-resistant wood was highly prized for shingles, barrels, and shipbuilding. Logging camps and sawmills operated throughout the region until cedar stands were largely depleted by the early 20th century.

==== Turpentine and resin ====
Pine trees in the region were also tapped for pitch, tar, turpentine, and rosin—essential materials for shipbuilding and other industries before petroleum-based substitutes became common. Workers known as "naval storesmen" processed these materials in small, seasonal camps scattered through the woods.

While these industries have largely vanished, their legacy remains in the many ghost towns and ruins scattered across the Pinelands.

== In popular culture ==
- The Pine Barrens is the setting and title of an episode of the crime-drama TV program The Sopranos. Despite the name, the episode was not filmed in either the New Jersey Pine Barrens nor one of the other, smaller pine barrens in the Northeast. Filming took place within Harriman State Park in New York because the production was denied a permit to film at the South Mountain Reservation in Essex County, though that reserve is also not within the New Jersey Pine Barrens.
- John McPhee's book, titled The Pine Barrens (1968), explores the history, ecology, and geography of the New Jersey Pine Barrens. His account is also infused with his personal memoirs. His book contributed to a reappraisal of the ecological role of pine barrens; in New Jersey and on eastern Long Island, they contribute to preserving the amount and quality of vital groundwater supplies in underground aquifers.
- In the What We Do In The Shadows episode "Pine Barrens", the characters go on a hunting trip in the Pine Barrens and encounter the Jersey Devil.
- The Real Adventures of Jonny Quest episode "The Spectre of the Pine Barrens" takes place in the New Jersey Pine Barrens, wherein the characters search for the Jersey Devil.
- The Fantastic Four visit the Barrens during a 2004 story arc. The group meets a population of aliens who have been visiting the Barrens for generations, giving rise to the legend of the Jersey Devil.
- The 2009 film Transformers: Revenge of the Fallen features the Pine Barrens as the location of a major fight scene in the film that culminates in Megatron killing Optimus Prime.
- The Pine Barrens is also the setting for the 2012 feature The Barrens, starring Stephen Moyer, and involving a story of the Jersey Devil.
- The New Jersey Pine Barrens is the setting of Aurelio Voltaire's 2013 horror novel Call of the Jersey Devil.
- In 2021, Six Flags Great Adventure in Jackson Township, New Jersey, established a section of the park dedicated to the New Jersey Pine Barrens. The Jersey Devil Coaster was opened there the same year.

== Gallery ==
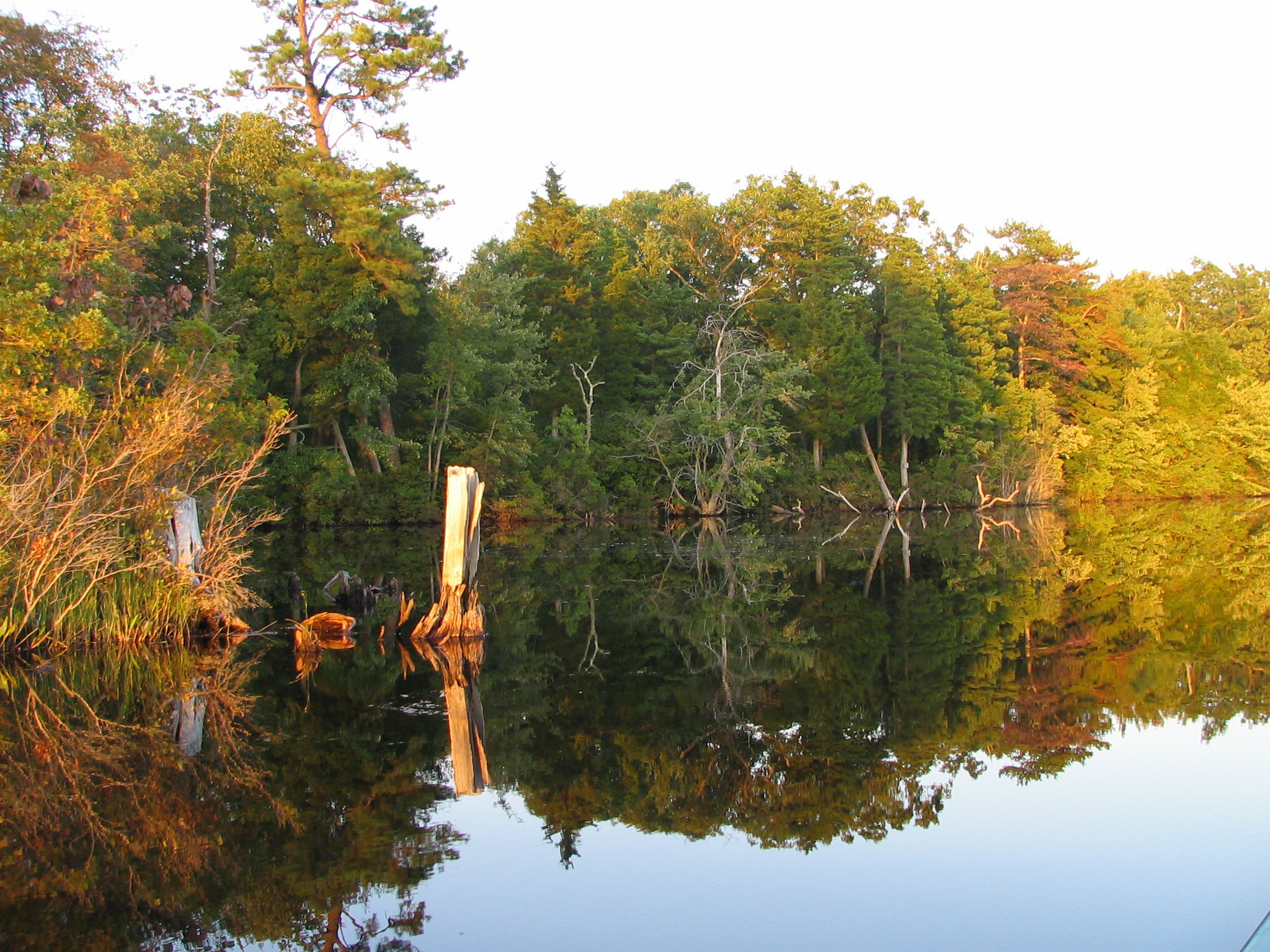
Atsion Lake

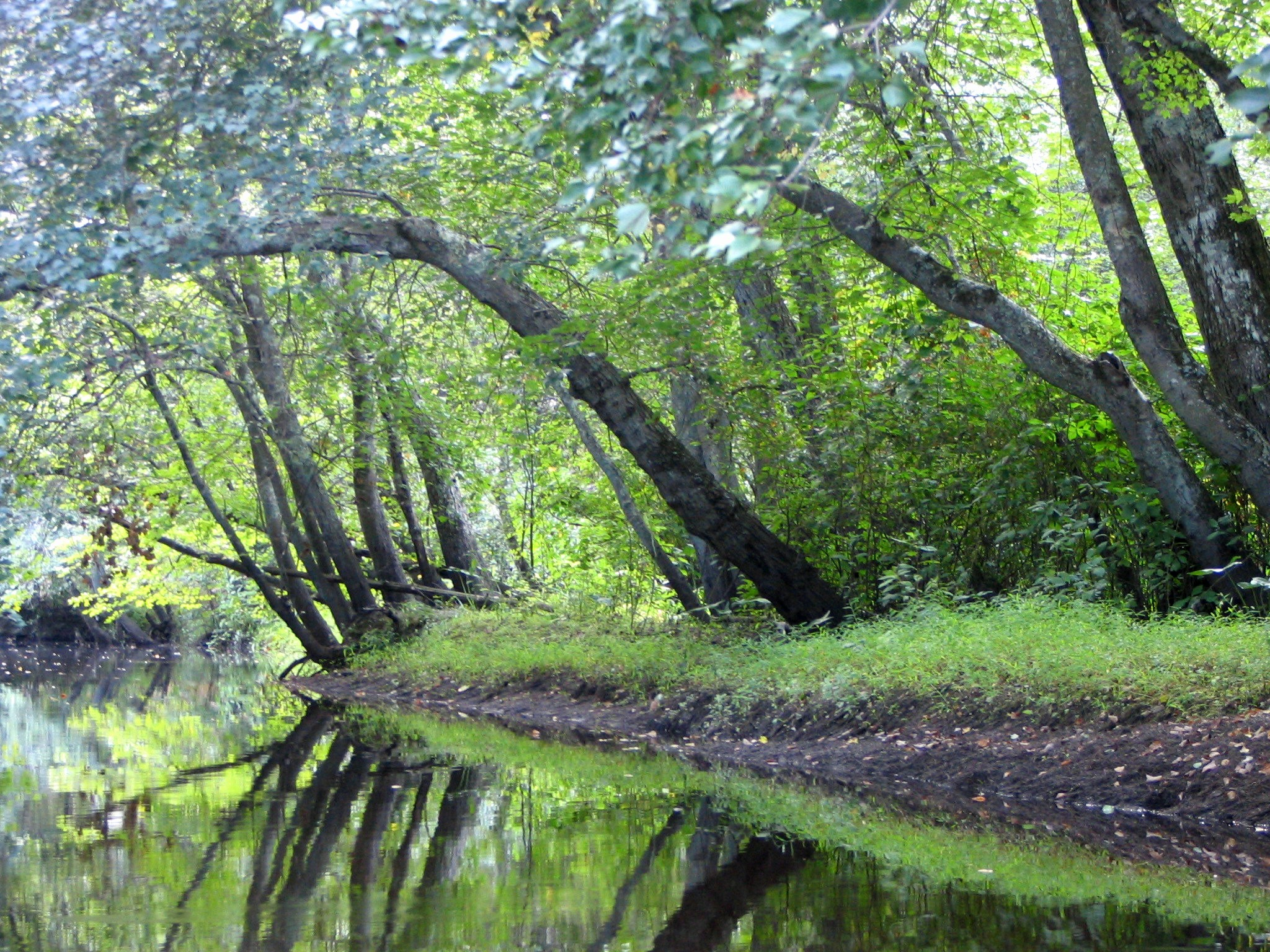
Batsto River

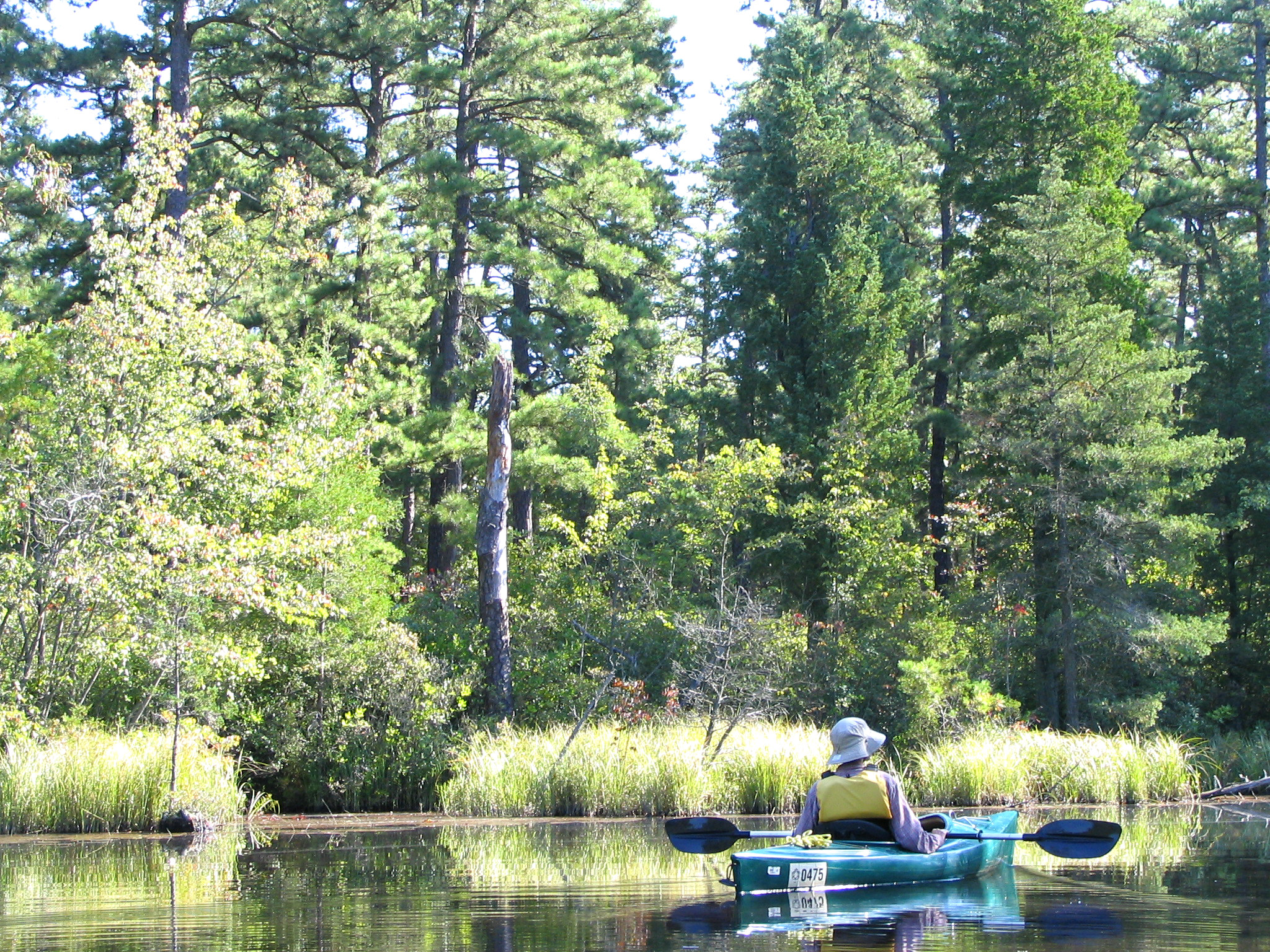
Kayaking on the Mullica River

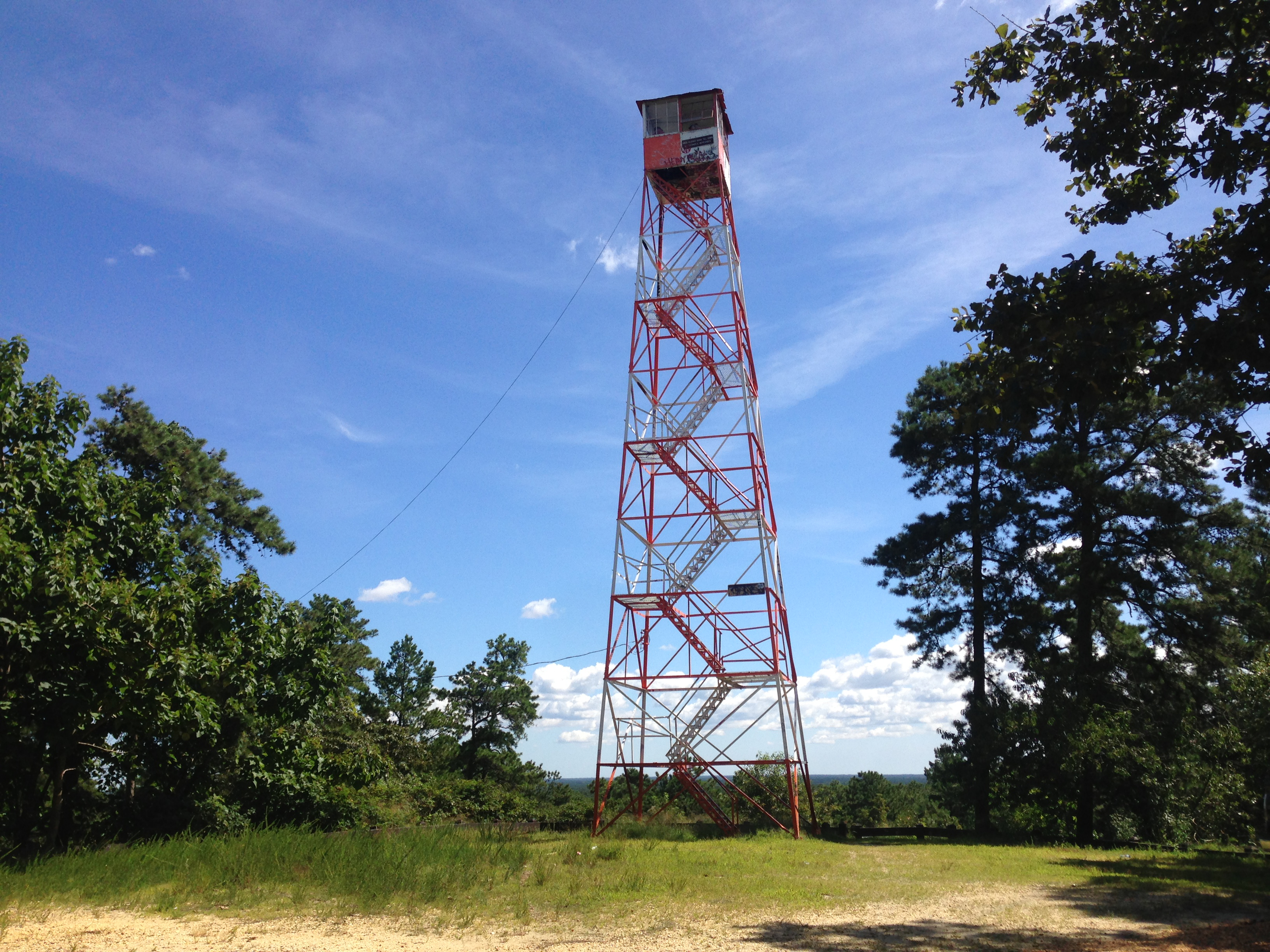
Fire tower on Apple Pie Hill

== See also ==
- Atlantic coastal pine barrens
- Long Island Central Pine Barrens
- Pinelands National Reserve
- Pine barrens
