= Sugar sand =

Various types of salt debris or soil

Sugar sand may refer to:

- Sugar sand, the organic salt debris that settles to the bottom of a container of maple sap once it has reached a sugar concentration of 66-67%.
- Sugar sand, the local name for a type of fine sandy soil found in the Pine Barrens, the southern part of the U.S. state of New Jersey.
  - Sugar sand, a soil type that is a component of traditional Baseball Rubbing Mud, eroded from the Pine Barrens, used by Major League Baseball as an abrasive to condition new baseballs.
- Sugar sand, a type of granular calcite found as an identifying marker bed in the Pfeifer shale member of the Greenhorn Limestone in Ellis, Ness, Hodgeman, and other Kansas counties.
- Sugar Sand Park, a municipal park in Boca Raton, Florida.
