= Kirkwood–Cohansey aquifer =

Aquifer system in New Jersey, US

Kirkwood-Cohansey aquifer
- Aquifer
- Location: South Jersey, New Jersey, United States
- Geology: Sand, silt, clay
- Website: New Jersey Pinelands Commission Website

The Kirkwood-Cohansey aquifer is an aquifer system in the New Jersey Pine Barrens. It covers approximately 3,000 square miles (7,800 km^{2}) and receives about 44 inches of precipitation each year. About fifty percent of this water is transpired by vegetation or evaporates back into the atmosphere. A small amount enters streams and rivers as storm runoff. About 17 to 20 inches annually actually enters the ground. Some of this water that enters the ground is pulled down through the soil and reaches the water table.

As its name implies, the Kirkwood–Cohansey aquifer consists of two geologic units. The Cohansey formation, above, consists mostly of sand, while the Kirkwood formation, below contains both silt and clay. This structure creates a water-confining layer below the aquifer while allowing the top layer of water-bearing sands to remain hydrologically connected to surface water. At 360 feet deep, the aquifer is prolific in wells and springs, with almost 1,000 high-capacity wells that yield on average 400 gallons per minute of groundwater.

== Water balance ==
The Kirkwood-Cohansey aquifer contains 17.7 trillion gallons of water, enough to cover New Jersey in 10 ft (3.0 m) of water, and enough to cover half of the United States water supply in a year. The waters support the Pine Barrens ecosystem.

Withdrawing water from the aquifer is managed by the Bureau of Water Allocation within the New Jersey Department of Environmental Protection (NJDEP). As of 2009, there were 958 high-capacity water wells registered with the NJDEP. The wells yield an average of 400 gallons of water per minute (gpm), with a peak output of 4,500 gpm. During the 1990s, an average of 21.7 billion gallons of water per year were withdrawn from the aquifer for public consumption. Agriculture used 12.9 billion gallons of water per year, while mining used about 8 billion gallons of water per year, mostly to clean sand pits for mineral extraction. Lower amounts of water were used for commerce, industry, and power consumption.

The water from the aquifer is generally fresh, acidic, corrosive, and low in dissolved solids. Radium, iron, and manganese occur in localized areas. Human consumption of water from the aquifer produced unhealthy levels of mercury in some wells. It is believed that the mercury detected in certain wells in the aquifer is due to human activity, and is not thought to occur naturally.

== Geography ==
The aquifer covers about 3,000 sq mi (7,800 km^{2}) of the New Jersey coastal plain, reaching as far north as Monmouth County, and extending to the south along the Atlantic coastline, and west to the Delaware Bay.

== Geology ==
During the Middle Miocene epoch – about 11.6–16 million years ago – the Atlantic Ocean covered what is now New Jersey from the Raritan Bay to the Delaware River. During this time, the ocean retreated and advanced, which deposited a 780 ft (240 m) layer of minerals that became known as the Kirkwood Formation. Much of the feature is below sea level, and few sections are observed near the surface, primarily in pits and along roadcuts. The bottom layer measures 77 to 177 ft (23 to 54 m) thick in Cape May County. The base consists of firm, brown clay, made up of quartz and Glauconite sand. In 1904, two members of the New Jersey Geological Survey identified the bottom layer of the Kirkwood Formation as "Asbury Park Member", made up of "Asbury Clay". On top of the layer of clay is the remainder of the Kirkwood Formation. A 140 ft (43 m) of coarse sand lies on top of the clay, which has a 20 ft (6.1 m) layer of Iron oxide cemented sandstone in the middle. Above that is a 40 to 280 ft (12 to 85 m) layer of diatomaceous clay, followed by a 50 ft (15 m) layer of sand. The top of the Kirkwood Formation is a 65 to 260 ft (20 to 79 m) layer of diatomaceous clay.

Over the next few million years, rivers carried sediment from mountains to the north and west of New Jersey. This layer of minerals became known as the Cohansey Formation. It consists largely of sand, with localized areas of gravel and clay, making it prone to erosion. As a result, the formation is scarcely visible at the surface, mostly in water channels.
