= Bass River State Forest =

State park in Burlington County, New Jersey, United States

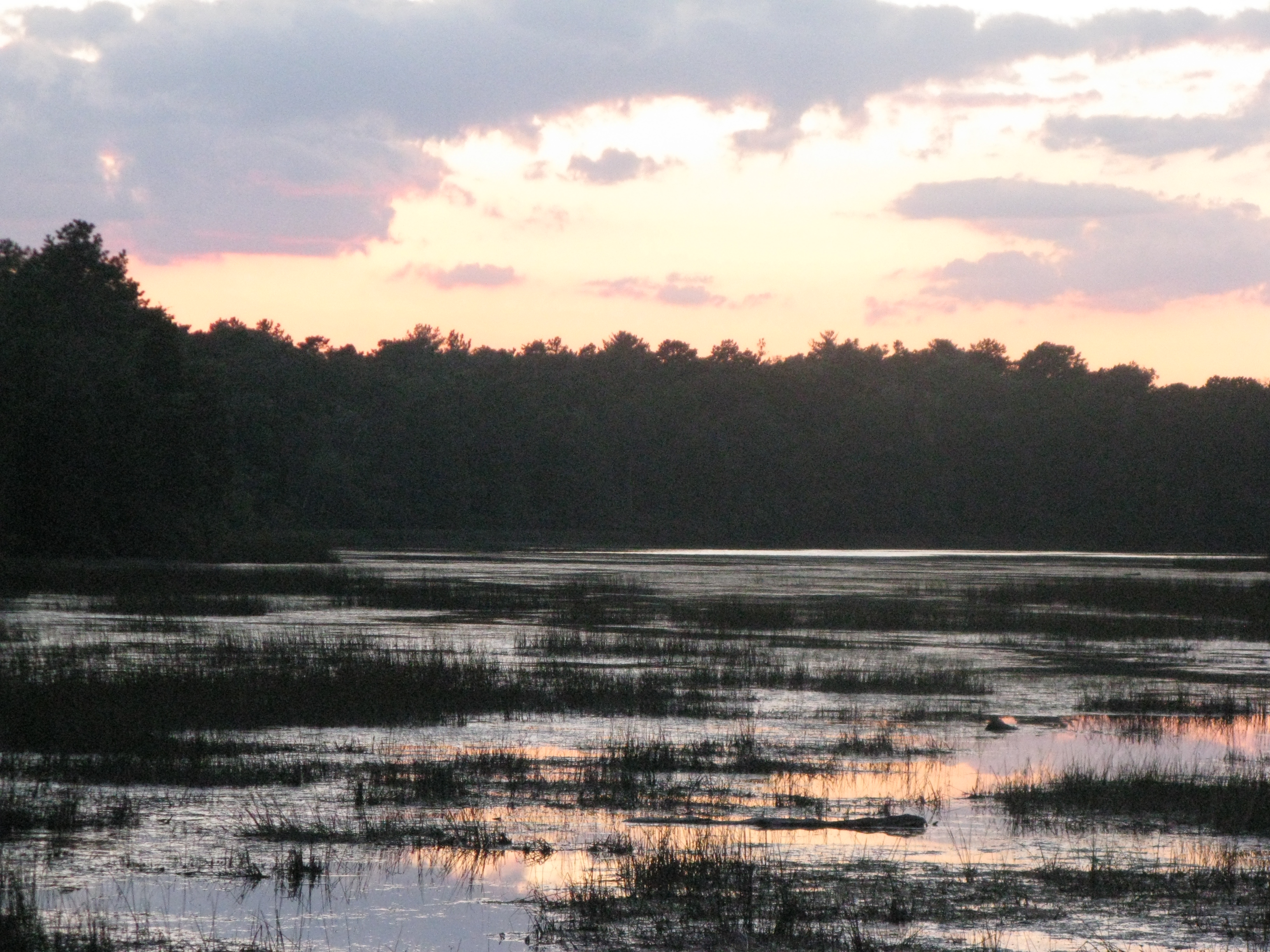

- Location within New Jersey Location within the United States
- Location: Burlington County
- Coordinates: 39°37′14″N 74°25′29″W
- Area: 23,563-acre (95.36 km^{2})
- Operator: New Jersey Division of Parks and Forestry
- Open: 1906
- Website: Official website

Bass River State Forest is a state park spanning over 30,000 acres in Burlington and Ocean Counties, New Jersey, United States. The park, named for the Bass River which crosses through it, shelters a portion of the environmentally sensitive Pine Barrens but also provides a variety of recreational resources to visitors. The park is operated and maintained by the New Jersey Division of Parks and Forestry.

== History ==
The first of New Jersey's state forests, Bass River State Forest was acquired by the New Jersey Legislature in 1905 for public recreation, water conservation, and wildlife and timber management. The lands were once occupied by the Absegami, a branch of the Lenape tribe of Native Americans in the United States.

== Lake Absegami ==
The 67 acres (0.27 km^{2}) Lake Absegami, created in the 1930s, provides swimming, boating and canoeing.

== Absegami Natural Area ==
A trail through the 128 acres (0.52 km^{2}) Absegami Natural Area provides access to a pine/oak woods and a small Atlantic white cedar bog, also containing red maples and magnolias. The Absegami self-guided trail is 0.5 miles (0.80 km) in length.

== West Pine Plains Natural Area ==
The 3,830 acres (15.5 km^{2}) West Pine Plains Natural Area preserves a pygmy forest, a globally rare stunted forest ecosystem consisting of pine and oak trees that reach a canopy height of as little as four feet at maturity. The forest supports the endangered broom crowberry and twelve rare species of moth.

== Batona Trail ==
The Batona Trail—running about 53 miles in total—passes through the park, as well as nearby Wharton and Brendan T. Byrne State Forests.

== See also ==
- List of New Jersey state parks
