= Atsion Lake =

Lake in New Jersey, US

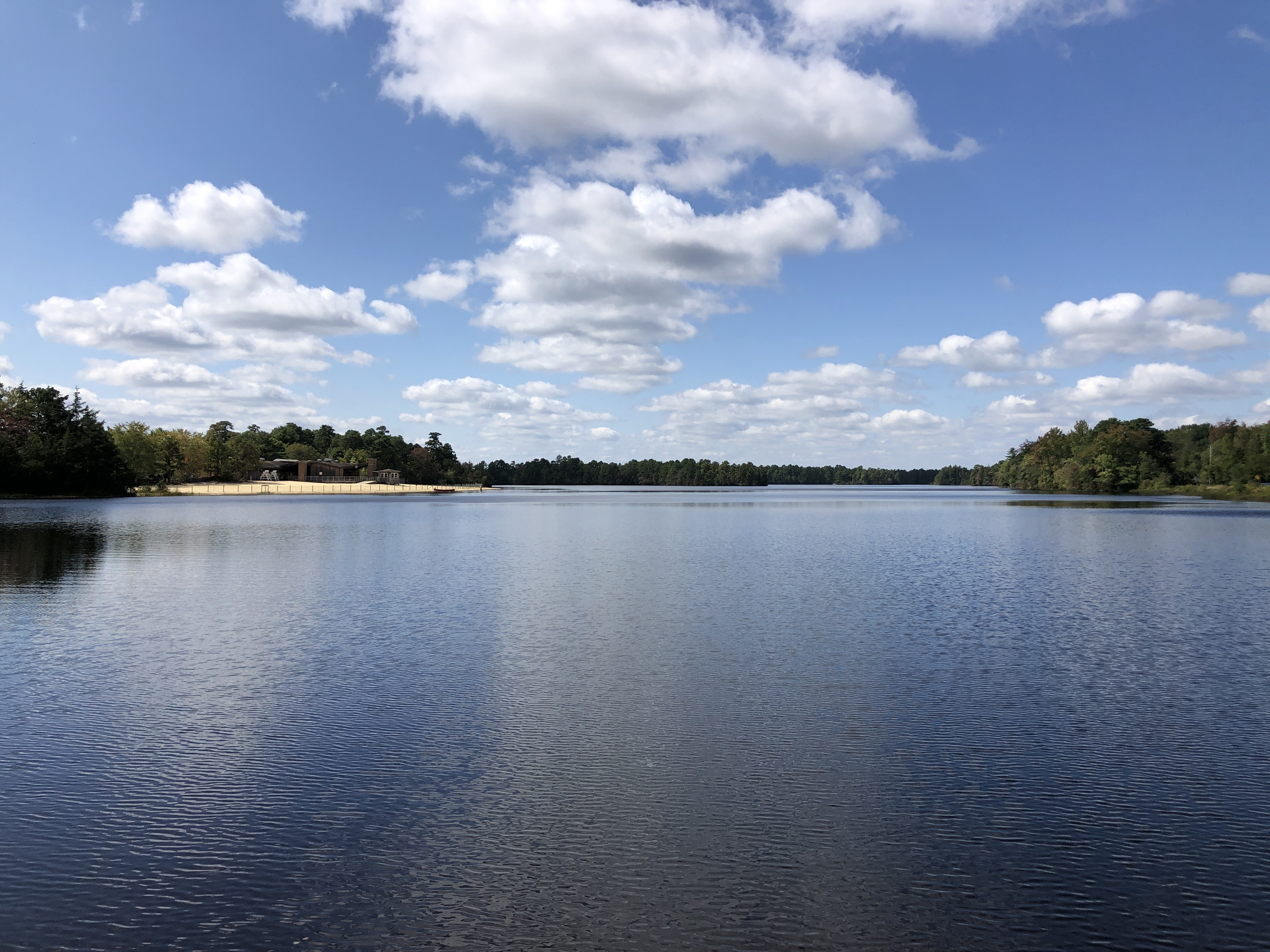
- Lake Atsion in the New Jersey Pine Barrens

- Location within New Jersey Location within the United States
- Coordinates: 39°44′28″N 74°43′59″W
- Website: Official website

Atsion Lake
- Location within New Jersey
- Location: Atsion, New Jersey, United States
- Coordinates: 39°44′28″N 74°43′59″W
- Type: Reservoir
- Primary inflows: Mullica River
- Primary outflows: Mullica River
- Basin countries: United States
- Surface elevation: 46 feet (14 m)

Atsion Lake is a man-made lake in Wharton State Forest in the Pine Barrens, in the community of Atsion, Burlington County, New Jersey. The lake is part of the Mullica River. It offers boating, hiking, fishing, swimming and camping facilities, and cross-country skiing in the winter.

== History ==
The name Atsion comes from the Lenni Lenape Unami language. It was the name for the strong, cedar-colored stream in which the tribe called Atsayunk, or Atsiunc. In late 1765, under Charles Read, Atsion became the site of an iron forge making bog iron in American Revolutionary times, and produced materiel for American forces. After the war, the area produced iron stoves, and a grist mill, saw mills and a paper mill were added. Still later, cotton and peanuts were grown. The state bought Atsion for Wharton State Forest in 1954.
