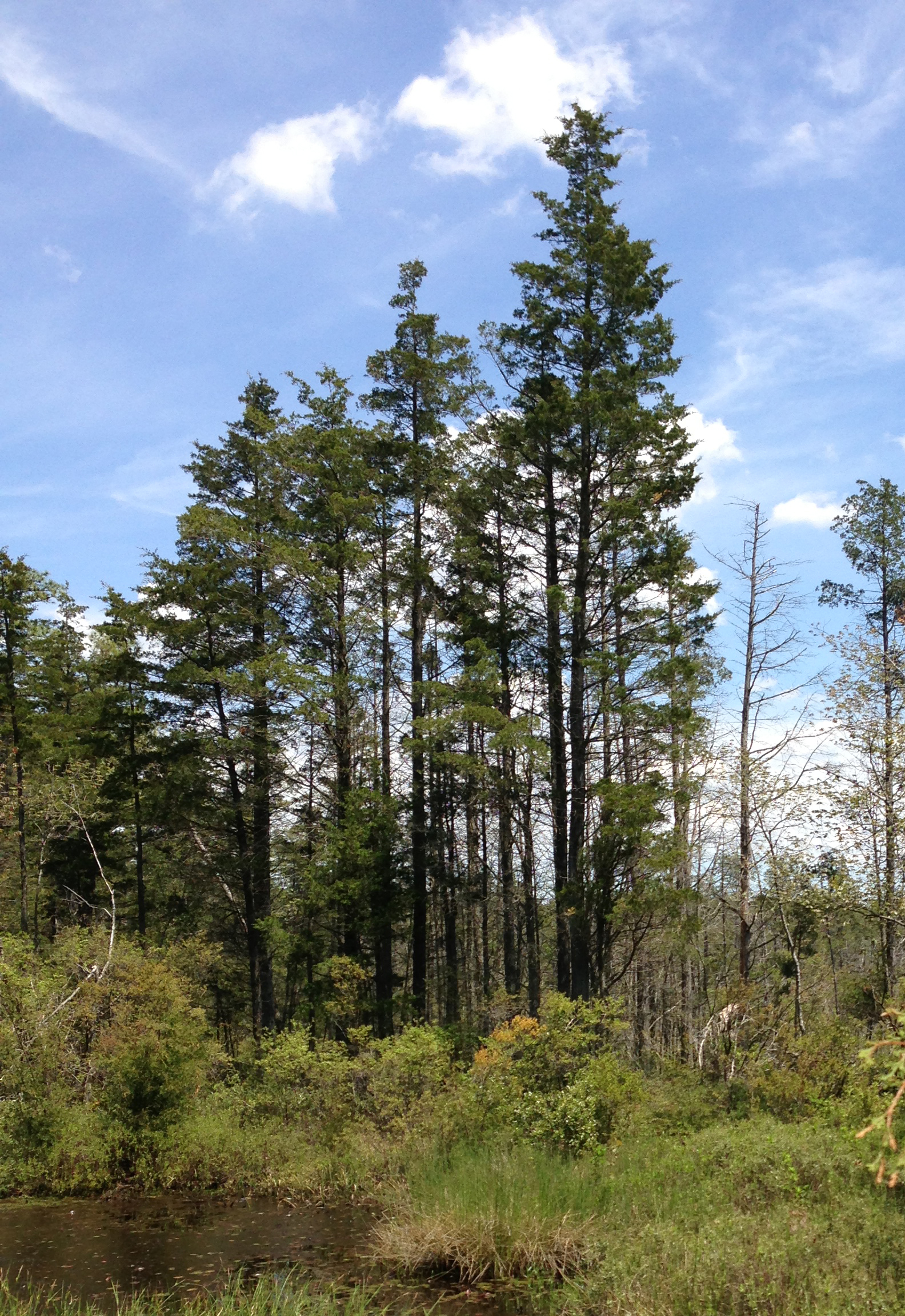
- Chamaecyparis thyoides near the edge of a bog in New Jersey

Conservation status
- Least Concern (IUCN 3.1)

Scientific classification
- Kingdom: Plantae
- Clade: Tracheophytes
- Clade: Gymnosperms
- Division: Pinophyta
- Class: Pinopsida
- Order: Cupressales
- Family: Cupressaceae
- Genus: Chamaecyparis
- Species: C. thyoides

Binomial name
- Chamaecyparis thyoides (L.) Britton, Sterns & Poggenb.
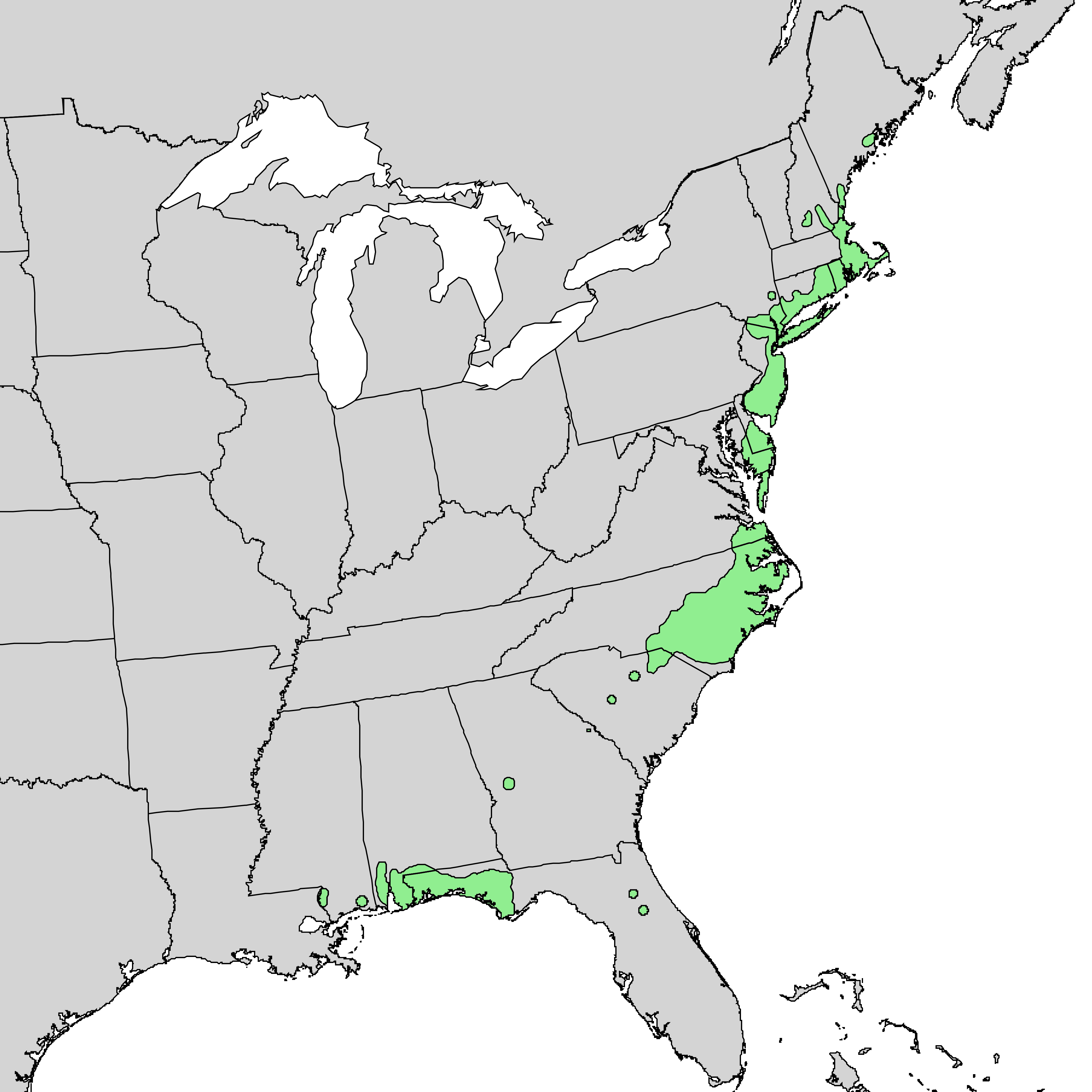
- Natural range of Chamaecyparis thyoides

= Chamaecyparis thyoides =

Species of conifer

Chamaecyparis thyoides, the Atlantic white cedar, Atlantic white cypress, southern white cedar, whitecedar, or false-cypress, is a species of conifer in the cypress family, Cupressaceae. It is native to the Atlantic coast of North America and is found from southern Maine to Georgia and along the Gulf of Mexico coast from Florida to Mississippi. It is one of two species of Chamaecyparis found in North America. C. thyoides resides on the East Coast and C. lawsoniana can be found on the West Coast. There are two geographically isolated subspecies, treated by some botanists as distinct species, by others at just varietal rank: Chamaecyparis thyoides thyoides and Chamaecyparis thyoides henryae (H.L.Li) E.Murray (syn. Chamaecyparis thyoides subsp. henryae (H.L.Li) Little; Chamaecyparis henryae H.L.Li)

The species grows in forested wetlands where they tend to dominate the canopy. The trees are associated with a wide variety of other wetland species because of their wide north-south range. The remaining populations are now found mostly in remote locations that would be difficult to harvest, so its popularity as a source of lumber has decreased.

== Distribution and habitat ==
Chamaecyparis thyoides grows within 100 miles of the coastline and less than 50 m above sea level along much of the East Coast and Gulf Coast. Rare populations grow in the foothills of the Appalachian Mountains, where the tree may be found up to 460 m above sea level. Nationally, Atlantic white cedar is protected in the Great Dismal Swamp National Wildlife Refuge, Alligator River National Wildlife Refuge, Pinelands National Reserve, Cape Cod National Seashore, Croatan National Forest, Francis Marion National Forest, Ocala National Forest, and Apalachicola National Forest. Altered fire regimes, logging, and draining of wetlands outside of the few protected areas have all contributed to the general decrease in the size and occurrences of Atlantic white cedar stands. The tree is listed as Rare in Georgia and New York, of Special Concern in Maine, and Extirpated in Pennsylvania. In Mississippi, the species is at risk of extirpation as a consequence of overexploitation, changes in land use, and extreme weather events.

Chamaecyparis thyoides lives almost exclusively in freshwater wetlands and is considered an obligate wetland species. It prefers habitats where the soil is saturated with water at least during the majority of the growing season. The soils in these regions have a thick organic layer, often classified as a histic surface horizon, with sandy material at greater depths and poor drainage. Atlantic white cedar wetlands are acidic and there is little oxygen stored in the soil because water has displaced the air. Plants that live in these environments must be specially adapted to such conditions.

=== Ecology ===
Red maple and black gum trees are often found in the canopy along with Atlantic white cedar throughout its range. Sphagnum mosses also often grow in these wetlands. The caterpillar of the Hessel's hairstreak butterfly feeds exclusively on C. thyoides, where its green color helps to camouflage it.

The trees themselves grow on hummocks, small mounds, with water pooling in the depressions surrounding them. This keeps the tree from being underwater year-round and helps to protect from floods. The tree benefits from periodic low-intensity fires which expose seedlings to sunlight and limit competition with other canopy flora, particularly red maple. Too frequent or intense fires or flooding can damage seedlings stored in the top layer of soil and full-grown trees.

== Description ==
Chamaecyparis thyoides is a coniferous tree usually growing to 20–28 m (66–92 ft) (but may grow up to 35 m (115 ft)) tall with an average diameter of 0.8 m (2 ft 7 in), up to 2 m (6 ft 7 in), and feathery foliage in moderately flattened sprays, green to glaucous blue-green in color. The leaves are scale-like, 2–4 mm (3/32–5/32 in) long, and produced in opposite decussate pairs on somewhat flattened shoots; seedlings up to a year old have needle-like leaves. The tree is bare of branches for three-fourths of the trunk height and the bark can be ash-gray to reddish brown. Bark is smooth on juveniles, but mature trees have deep ridges and bark as thick as 5 cm (2 in). C. thyoides is monoecious, so a single tree will carry both the pollen and seeds needed for reproduction in cones. The seed cones are globose, 4–9 mm (5/32–11/32 in) diameter, with 6-10 scales (1-2 seeds per scale), green or purple, maturing to brown in 5–7 months after pollination. The pollen cones are yellow but turn brown as the tree matures, 1.5–3 mm (1/16–1/8 in) long and 1–2 mm (1/32–3/32 in) broad, releasing their yellow pollen once a year in spring. The tree begins bearing seeds at 4–5 years, but does not reach full maturity and start producing cones until it is 10-20 years old. Seeds are dispersed nearly every year and travel by wind. Height and diameter of the tree increase steadily until the tree is 50 years old, at which point height growth slows. Both height and diameter no longer increase once the tree is 100 years old. Stands are generally all younger than 200 years, though some trees as old as 1000 years have been reported. Because they have relatively shallow roots, C. thyoides are vulnerable to being blown over by wind.

=== Subspecies variation ===
- Chamaecyparis thyoides thyoides: Leaves and immature cones usually glaucous blue-green; cones mature to dark brown-black; facial leaves flat, not ridged, but with visible glands.
- Chamaecyparis thyoides henryae: Leaves and immature cones green, not glaucous; cones mature to light brown; facial leaves with a longitudinal ridge with glands less obvious or absent.

== Cultivation and uses ==
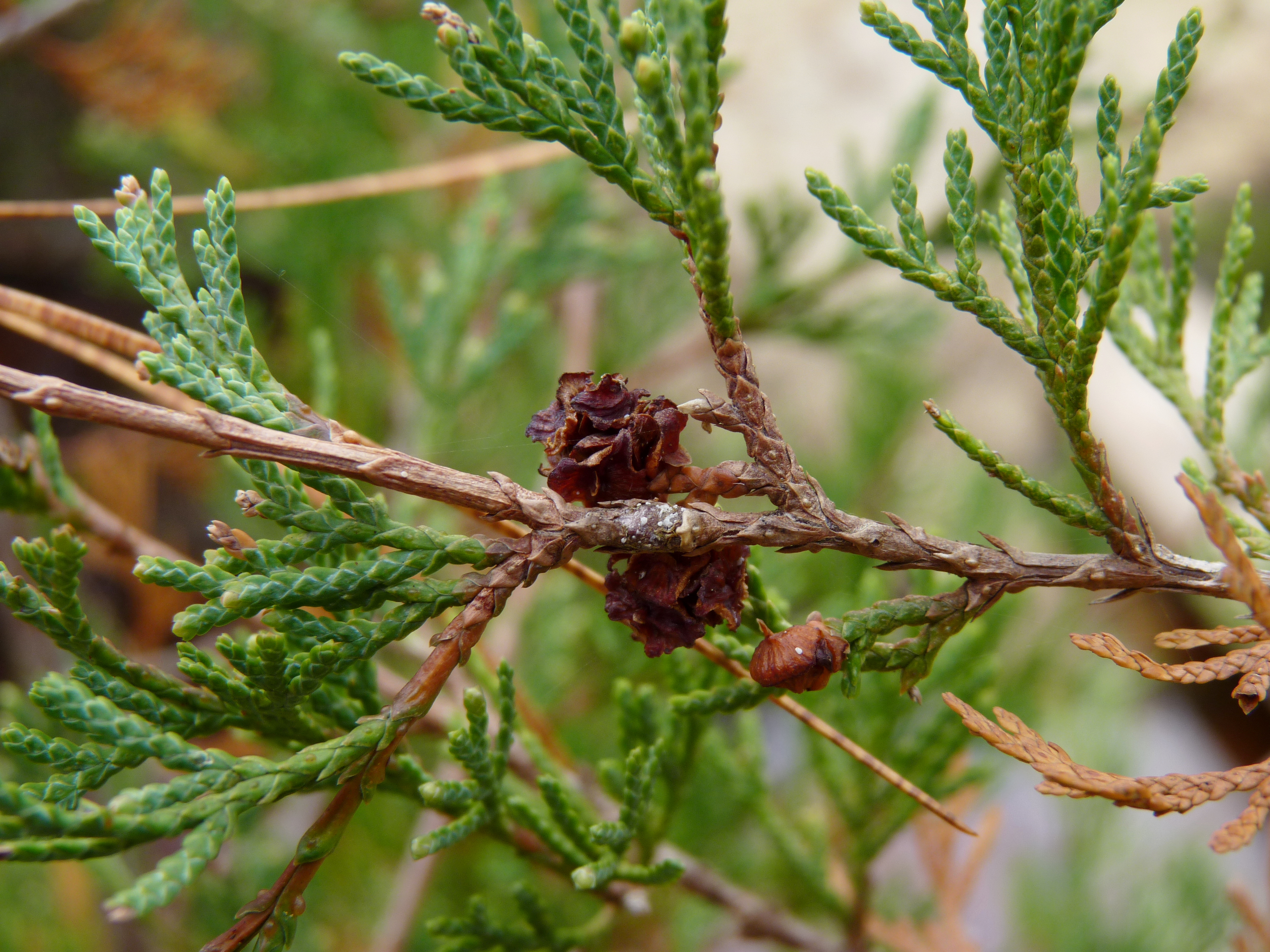
Foliage and seed cones

Chamaecyparis thyoides is of some importance in horticulture, with several cultivars of varying crown shape, growth rates and foliage color having been selected for garden planting. Named cultivars include 'Aurea' (yellow foliage), 'Heatherbun' (dwarf, purple in winter), 'Andelyensis' (dwarf, dense foliage), 'Ericoides' (juvenile foliage), and 'Glauca' (strongly glaucous foliage). In some locations, particularly Mobile County, Alabama, the tree is cultivated as a Christmas tree.

=== Wood ===
Its wood is considered hardy, as it is resistant to decay and warping in a variety of temperatures and moisture levels. The most common use of white cedar wood is lumber, for which stands usually require 70 years of growth from germination to harvest. The lumber may be used in house construction, though scarcity of Atlantic white cedar makes it difficult to use as the primary material. The wood was favored for roof shingles because it is lightweight, but has since been replaced by cheaper and more fire-resistant materials such as asphalt. The durability of the heartwood makes it popular for use as siding and paneling, and the less resistant sapwood has been used for interior finishes. White cedar lumber has also been used in boat construction, but this requires much older, larger trees. North Carolina is the greatest producer of lumber for boat construction because it has the greatest number of old-growth C. thyoides forests. Other uses include fencing, telephone and electric poles, woodenware, duck decoys, lawn furniture, and as Christmas trees.

== Conservation ==
Prior to European colonization of the Americas, there were an estimated 500,000 acres (200,000 ha) of swamps and bogs dominated by stands of Atlantic white cedars. At present, less than 100,000 acres (40,000 ha) still remain. Though the tree is not listed as threatened, Atlantic white cedar wetlands are considered a globally threatened ecosystem, and often serve as carbon sinks because of their peat-building abilities. Since 2012, ex situ gene conservation efforts of Atlantic white cedars have been ongoing at North Carolina State University and the United States Forest Service.

== Gallery ==
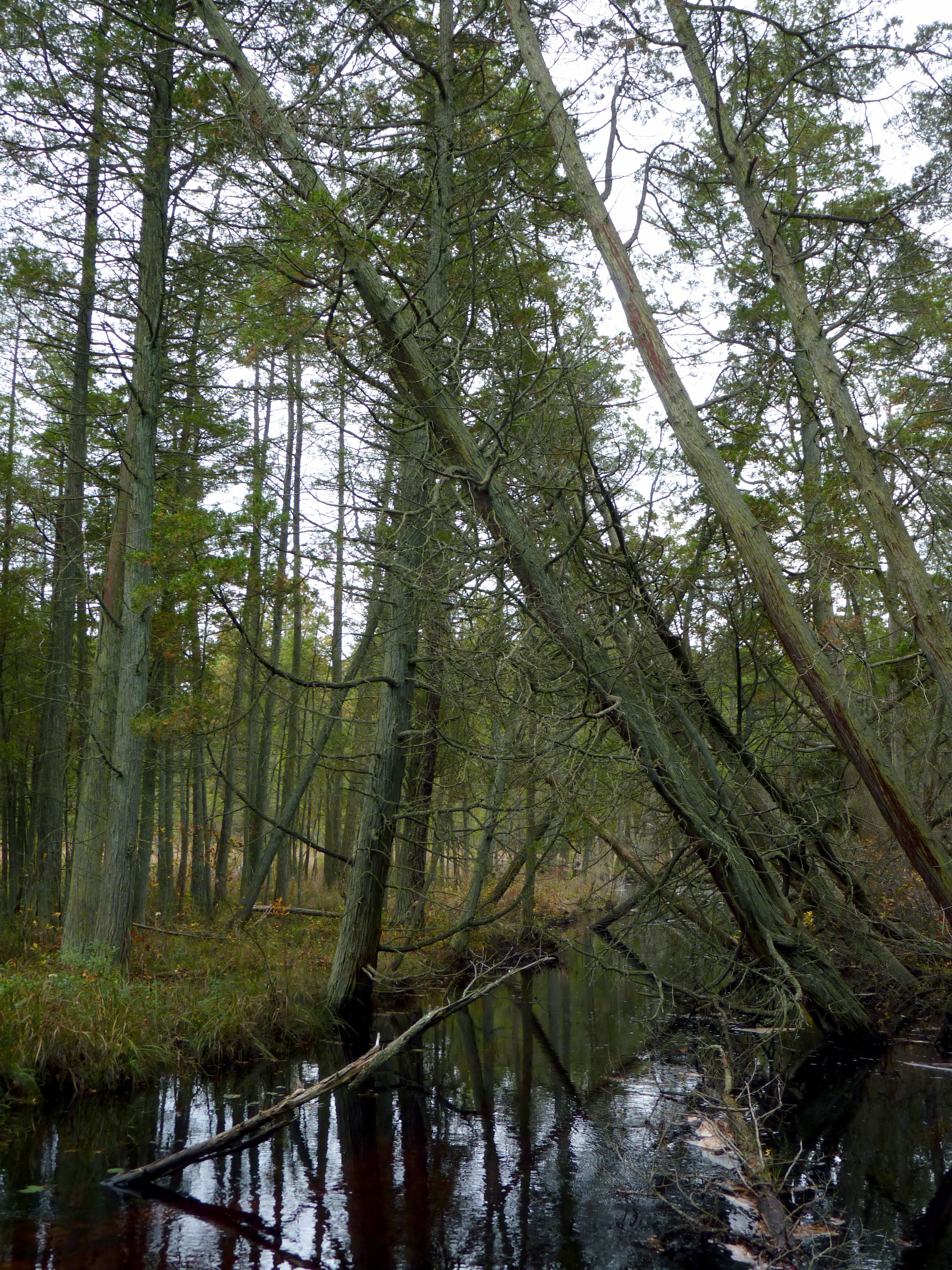
Chamaecyparis thyoides in bog habitat, Franklin Parker Reserve in New Jersey

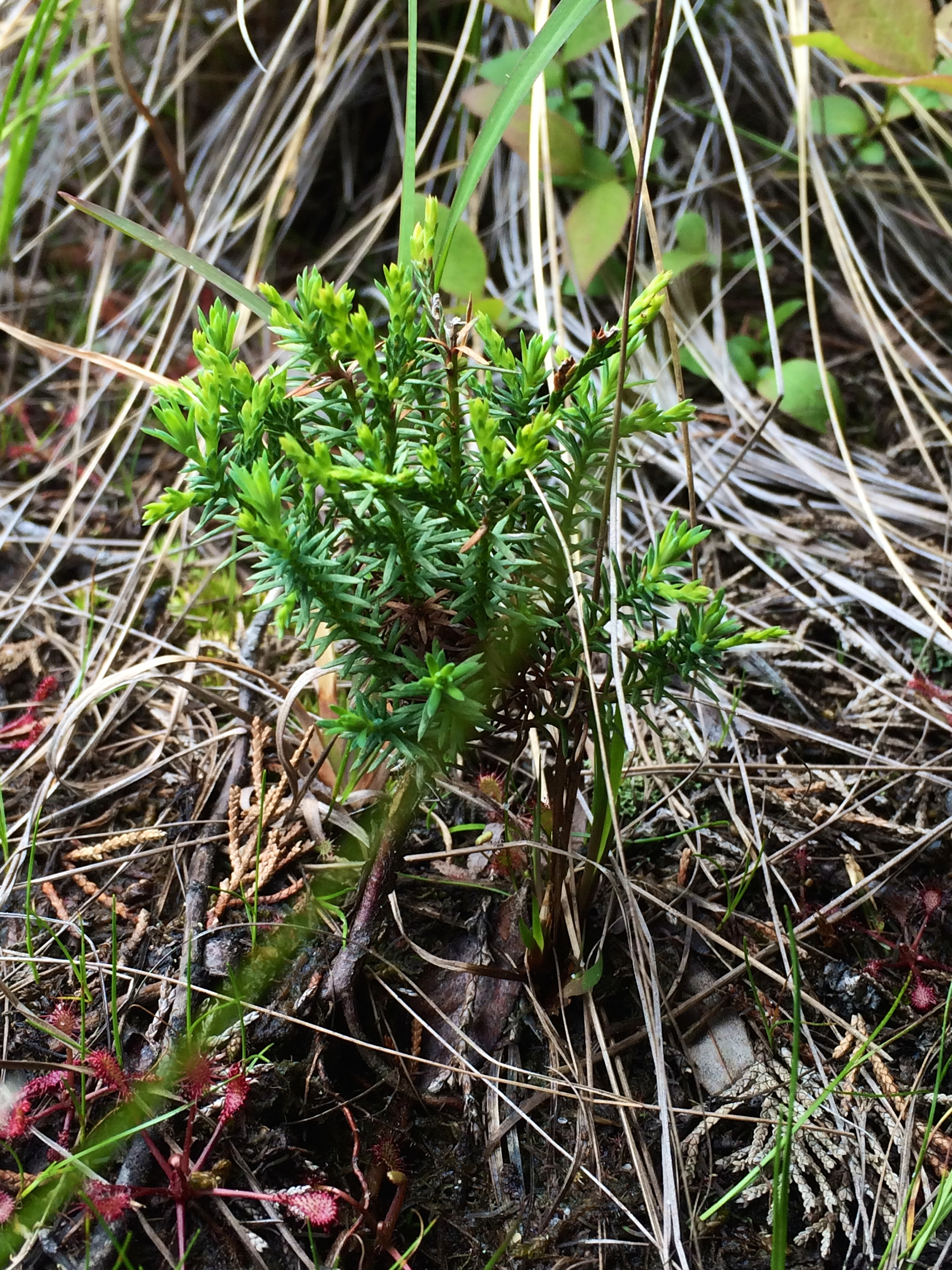
Seedling

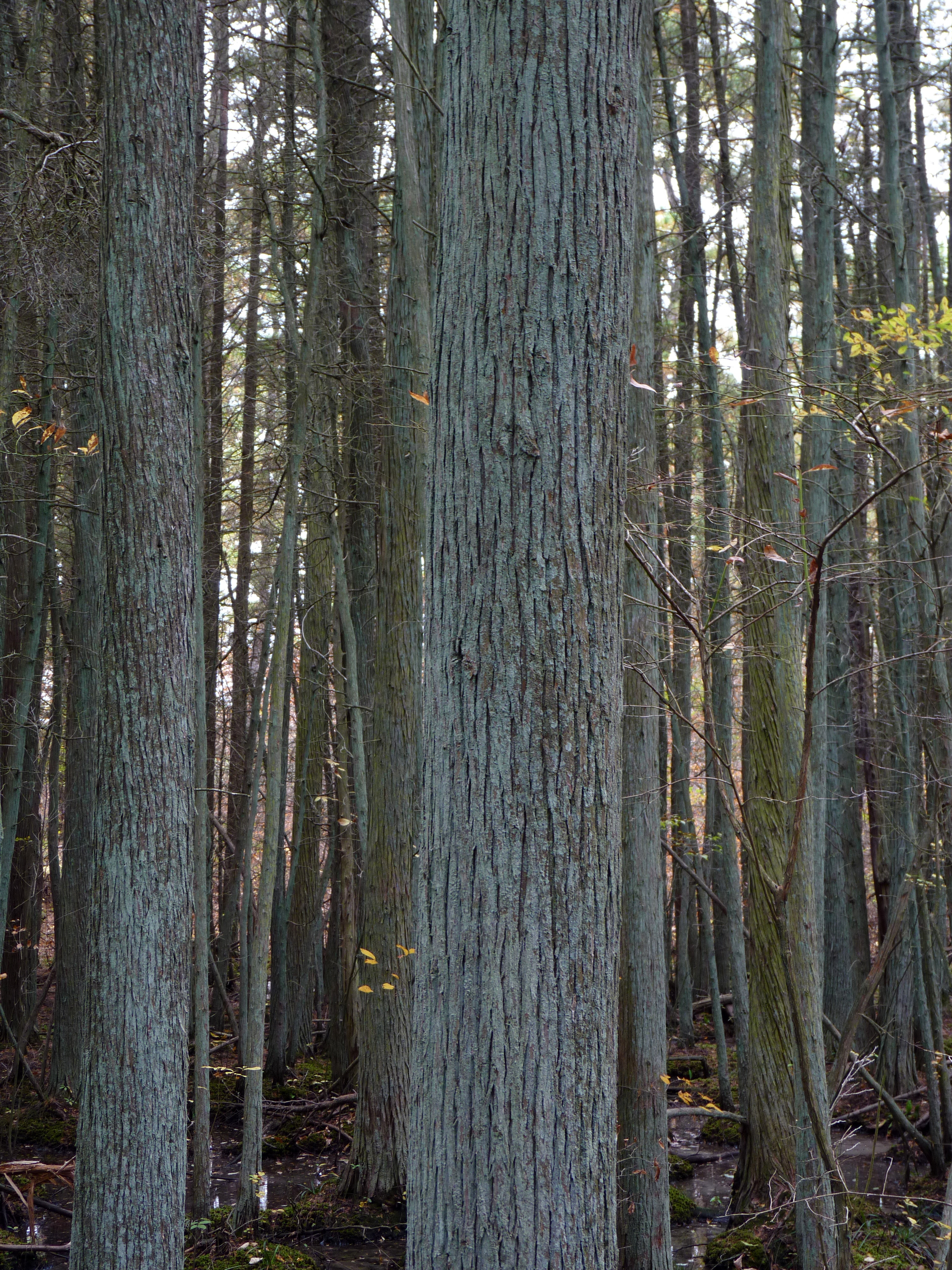
C. thyoides trunks in Franklin Parker Reserve

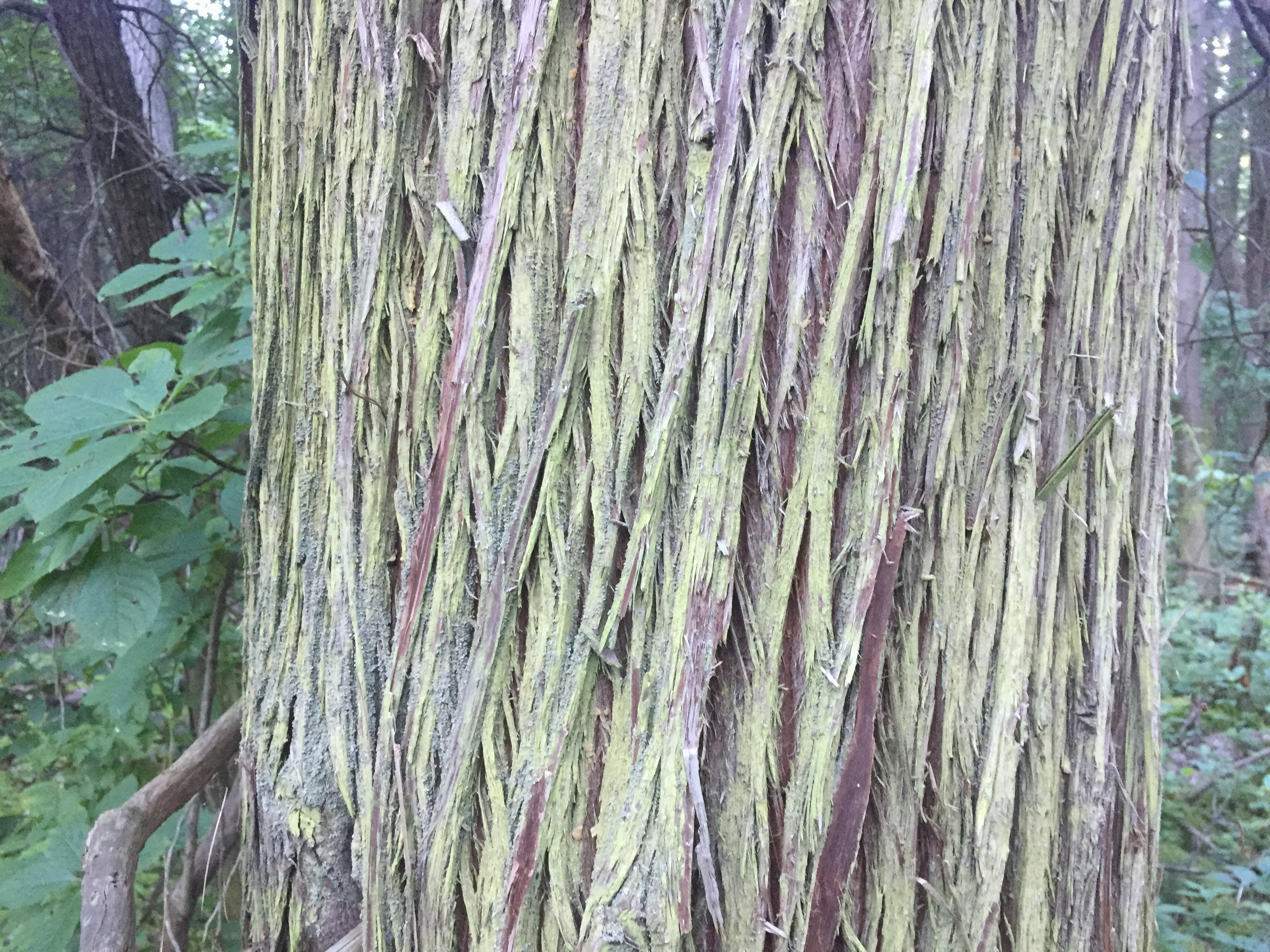
Close up of bark, Blue Hills Reservation in Massachusetts

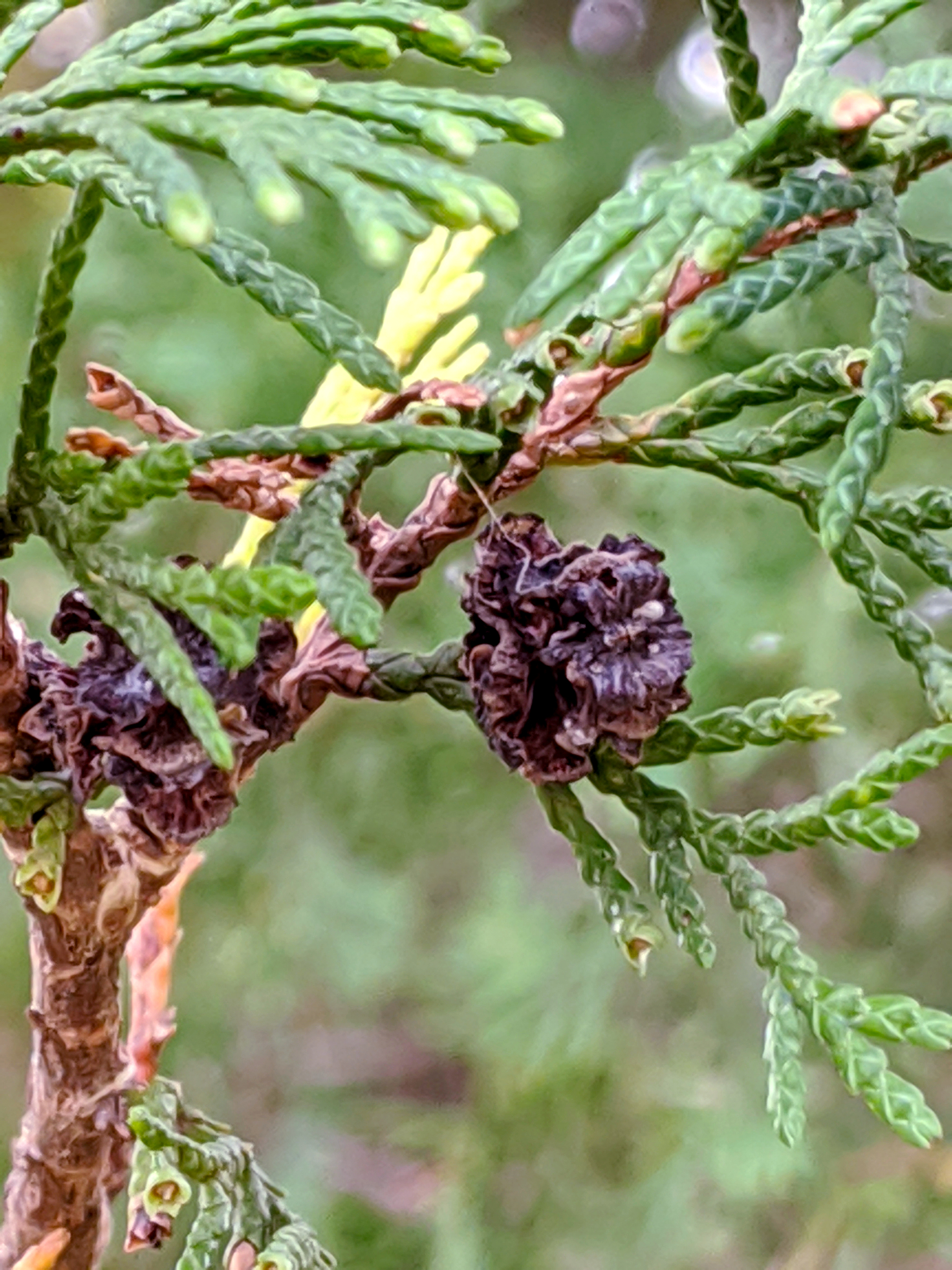
Mature cone in Penn State Forest, New Jersey
