= List of New Jersey state parks =

State parks and forests in New Jersey.

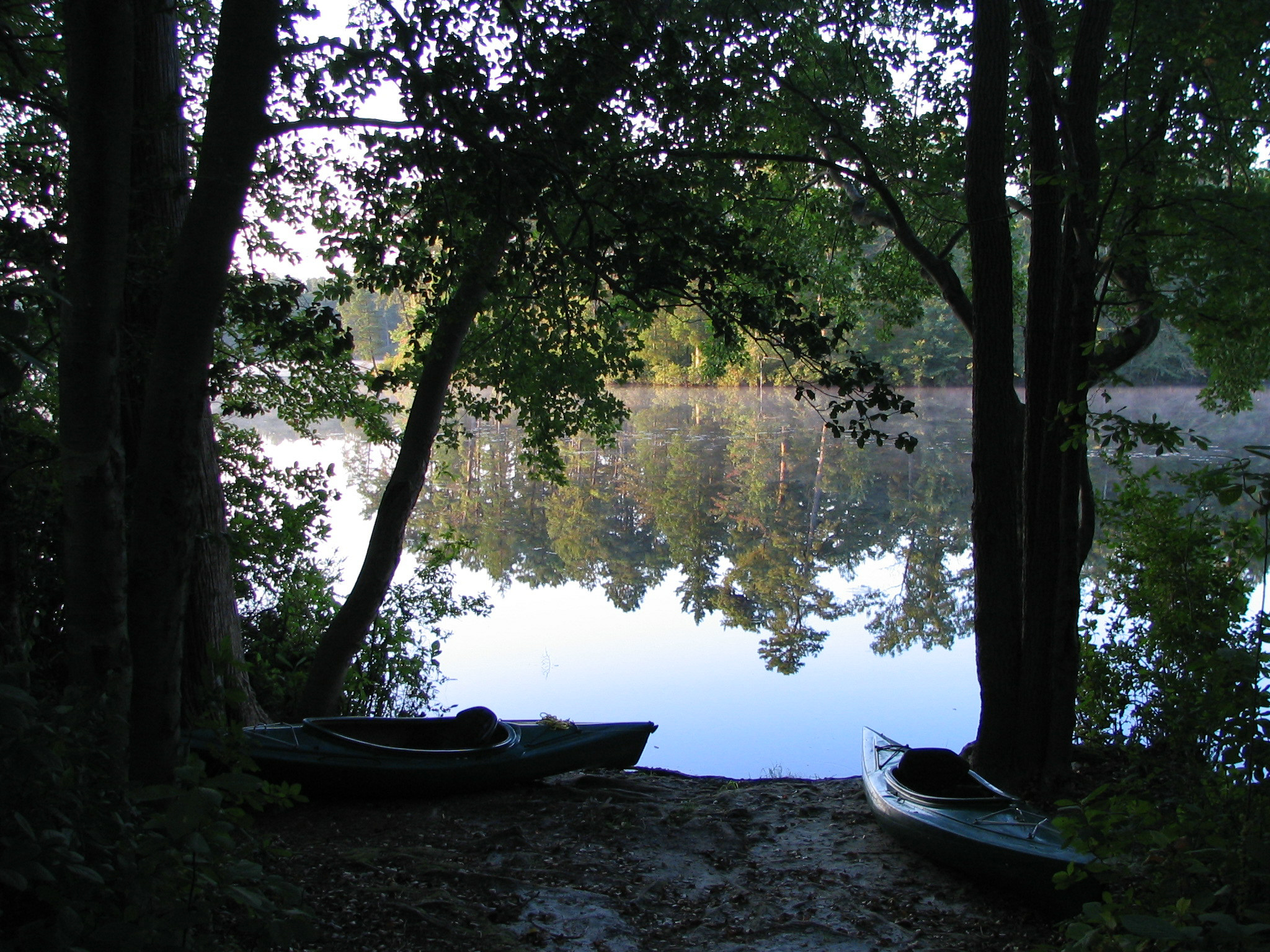
Atsion Recreation Area in Wharton State Forest

This is a list of state parks, forests, and historic sites in the U.S. state of New Jersey. The state park system comprises 430,928 acres (1,743.90 km^{2})—roughly 7.7% of New Jersey's land area—and serves over 17.8 million annual visitors.

The New Jersey State Parks unit of the New Jersey Division of Parks and Forestry, established in 1923, manages over 50 protected areas designated as state parks, state forests, recreation areas, and other properties. The agency also owns and manages 38 historical sites (some located within the boundaries of state parkland), five public marinas, and four public golf courses. New Jersey's state park system includes properties as small as the 32-acre (0.13 km^{2}) Barnegat Lighthouse State Park and as large as the 115,000-acre (470 km^{2}) Wharton State Forest.

== History ==
=== Forests and the Forest Park Reservation Commission ===
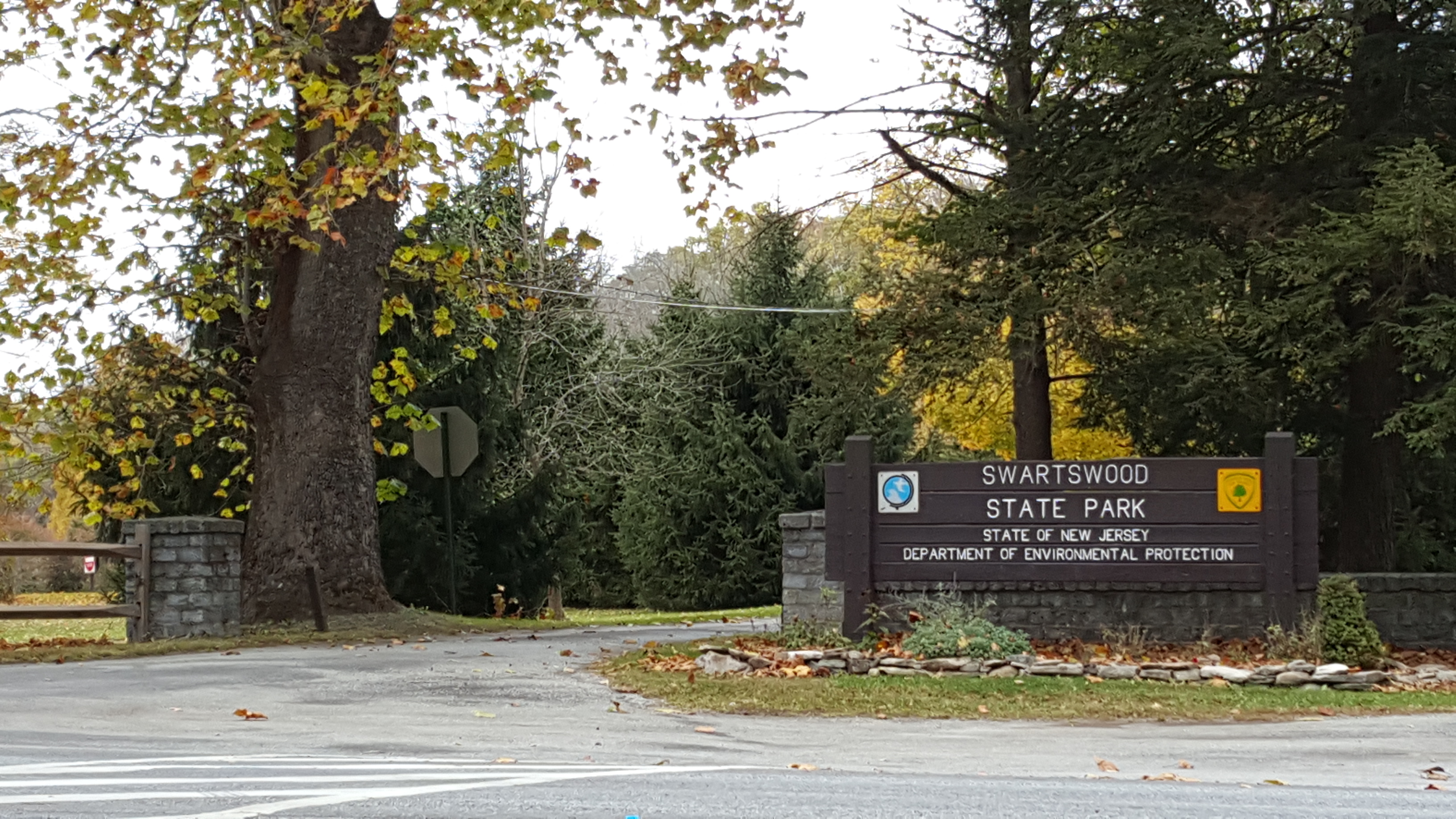
Entry gate and sign at Swartswood State Park--New Jersey's first state park

At the beginning of the twentieth century, New Jersey did not have much of a lumber or forestry industry. The value of its trees was insignificant and undermined by destruction by uncontrolled forest fires, and after decades of clear-cutting forests to fuel iron forges, furnaces, and other industrial operations. In 1896, the state geologist recommended the acquisition of land for parks in order to protect water supplies and to provide natural recreation to the state's increasing urban populations. After several years of reports and advocacy of geologists and naturalists (including, notably, U.S. forester Gifford Pinchot), New Jersey governor Edward C. Stokes established the Forest Park Reservation Commission in 1905 to protect forest land and create a system of park reserves within the state. At the commission's meeting on September 12, 1905, the commissioners adopted the Salem Oak (of Salem, New Jersey) as a symbol of New Jersey's parks. The commissioners acquired two tracts in southern New Jersey, near Mays Landing and along the Bass River, as the first state forest reserves. The Mays Landing tract was sold in 1916 after opposition from local officials and landowners made acquisition and expansion on adjacent lands impossible. The Bass River tract became the core of Bass River State Forest. In 1907, the commissioners would also acquire 5,000 acres (20 km^{2}) on Kittatinny Mountain near Culver's Gap, supplemented by a gift from Governor Stokes, which would become the core of Stokes State Forest. The reservations, which by 1912 comprised 13,720 acres (55.5 km^{2}) became sites for studying forests, reforestation projects, and scientific forestry. With the acquisition of a tract that included Swartswood Lake in Stillwater Township, the commission began developing parks for the purposes of recreation by providing boating, fishing, camping, and picnicking. In the Commission's 1915 Annual Report, they stated "It is intended to make Swartswood a public playground. Boat liveries and picnic shelters to be maintained under proper control will make it available to a large number of people". The Forest Park Reservation Commission was consolidated with other agencies into the Department and Board of Conservation and Development on April 8, 1915.

=== State Park Service ===
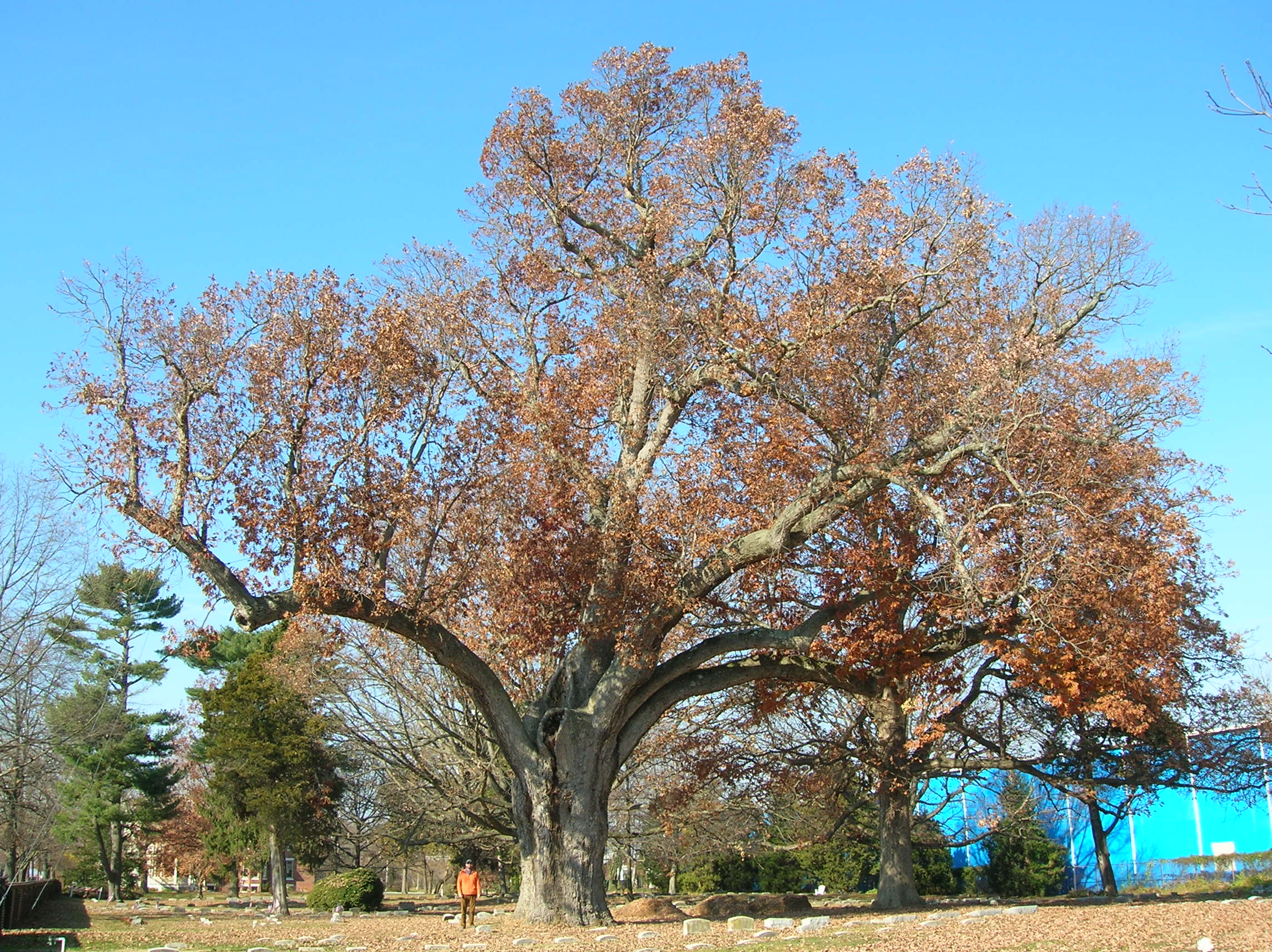
The Salem Oak, which was alive in 1675 when John Fenwick founded Salem, New Jersey, has been the symbol of New Jersey's state parks since 1905.

In 1923, the legislature authorized the creation of the State Park Service to administer the state parks and forests. New Jersey began to redirect its efforts from the development of these and other properties for recreational purposes instead of protecting or promoting the commercial potential of forested land. The state legislature established a commission to create a historic park along the Delaware River above Trenton, at the location where George Washington and Continental Army crossed the river on December 25, 1776 before the surprise attack on Hessian troops at the Battle of Trenton and the Battle of Princeton (January 3, 1777). The initial plans were defeated by a public referendum, but there was increased desire to complete these plans to establish a Washington Crossing Memorial Park in time for the 150th anniversary of American independence in 1926. The park was officially dedicated and opened to the public on June 4, 1927. In the wake of World War I, state forester Alfred Gaskill proposed a new public park along Kittatinny Mountain, "as the State’s memorial to its sons who had made the supreme sacrifice in the Great War". A few years later, Colonel Anthony R. Kuser donated his mountaintop estate at High Point (the state's highest elevation) to the state for a public park with an additional gift of $500,000 to erect a granite-clad obelisk to honor veterans. Construction of the monument began in 1928 and was completed in 1930.

According to the New Jersey Conservation Foundation, the New Jersey Division of Parks and Forestry administers and manages 430,928 acres (1,743.90 km^{2}) in its state parks, forests, and other areas. These areas, during the state's 2006 fiscal year (from July 1, 2005 to June 30, 2006) recorded 17,843,541 visitors.

=== Planning future parks ===
In 2006, the Division of Parks and Forestry began planning and preliminary work two new state parks: Great Falls State Park in Paterson, and Capital State Park in Trenton. The state's only other urban park is Liberty State Park in Jersey City. According to the master plan prepared by Philadelphia-based planning and urban design firm Wallace Roberts & Todd, Capital State Park would incorporate areas around the state's capitol complex in Trenton and the city's Delaware River and Assunpink Creek waterfronts to provide "a long-term strategy to revitalize Trenton by reestablishing connections to the downtown and reclaiming its riverfront." Great Falls subsequently became Paterson Great Falls National Historical Park.

In 2009, the state also purchased 1,174 acres (4.75 km^{2}) in Jefferson Township the former site of the Mount Paul monastery and seminary belonging to Paulist Fathers (from 1924–2009). The tract, which will be developed into a state park, is located in the state's Highlands region on the eastern side of Sparta Mountain and featuring mountain streams that flow into the Russia Brook (a tributary of the Rockaway River).

In 2021, Governor Phil Murphy approved the state purchase of part of an abandoned right-of way from Norfolk Southern Railway for the purpose of converting it into a new state park tentatively named the Essex - Hudson Greenway . The park will run from Montclair to Jersey City. Largely facilitated by the Open Space Institute, the park will also be a crucial section of the East Coast Greenway as well as part the 9/11 Memorial Trail, which will connect Shanksville, The Pentagon, and One World Trade Center. It will connect to the proposed Hackensack River Greenway and possibly the Hudson River Waterfront Walkway. The park may also incorporate a "transitway, a project proposed in NJ Transit's "Innovation Challenge", which aims to add a new, creative transportation solutions to The Meadowlands

== Recreation and facilities ==
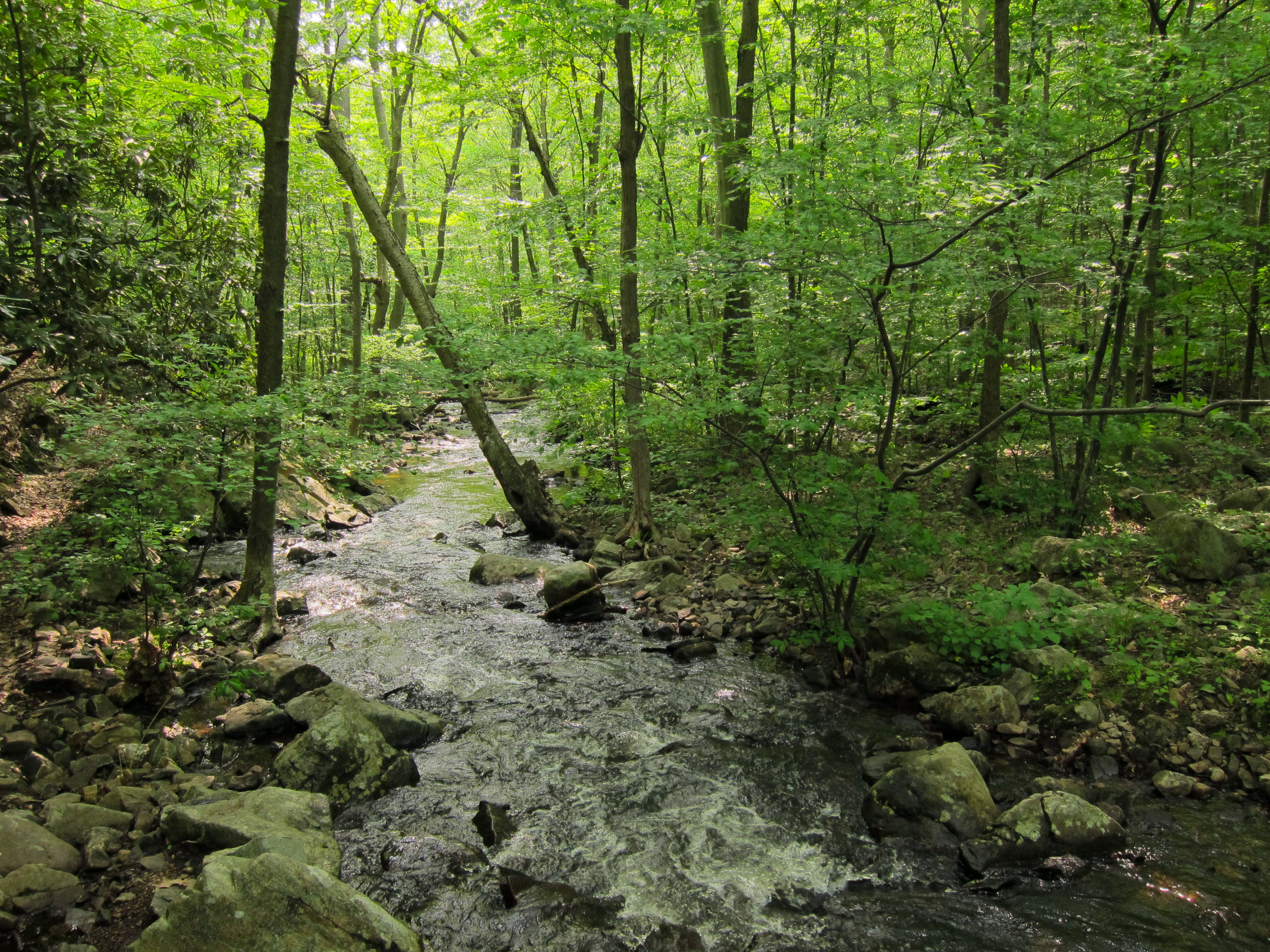
Post's Brook along the Lower Trail in Norvin Green State Forest

The State Park Service asks its visitors to embrace the "Carry In, Carry Out" philosophy in order to "keep the parks clean and beautiful by carrying out the trash you carry in".

Fishing and hunting are permitted in several of the state parks and forest.

=== Golf courses ===
The State Park System also includes four golf courses that are open to the public. Each of the four courses include associated restaurant and banquet facilities and is operated under contract between a private management company and the New Jersey Division of Parks and Forestry. Centerton Golf Course, located in Pittsgrove Township in Salem County is located within Parvin State Park. Cream Ridge Golf Course is located in Cream Ridge in Monmouth County and was acquired by the state in 2006. Spring Meadow Golf Course in Farmingdale in Monmouth County was privately developed and operated beginning in the 1920s and acquired by the state five decades later.

- White Oaks Golf Course - Gloucester County 2951 Dutch Mill Road Newfield, NJ 08344

Several of these properties were acquired as part of open space preservation initiatives managed by the New Jersey Department of Environmental Protection's Green Acres Program.

== State parks ==
Park name	Image	Location	County	Year established	Area	Remarks
Allaire		Howell and Wall Townships; 40°09′44″N 74°07′54″W	Monmouth	1941	3,205 acres (12.97 km^{2})	Features restored nineteenth-century ironworks, Allaire Village; ecosystem and geography of New Jersey's coastal plains region and Manasquan River floodplain—habitat for over 200 species of wildflowers, trees and plants, and birds; includes high-iron and acidic podzolic soils and bog iron deposits. Hosts the Pine Creek Railroad, an excursion rail line operated by the New Jersey Museum of Transportation.
Allamuchy Mountain		Allamuchy, Byram, Green, and Mount Olive Townships; 40°55′16″N 74°46′56″W	Morris Sussex Warren	1966	9,092 acres (36.79 km^{2})	Located along Allamuchy Mountain and Musconetcong River, features 2,440-acre (9.9 km^{2}) Allamuchy Natural Area of mature mixed oak-hardwood forests, natural fields; 14 miles (23 km) of marked and 20 miles (32 km) of unmarked trails including Sussex Branch Trail and Highlands Trail.
Barnegat Lighthouse		Barnegat Light; 39°45′47″N 74°06′29″W	Ocean	1951	32 acres (0.13 km^{2})	The site of Barnegat Lighthouse (1859); offers marine birdwatching and saltwater fishing, located along on New Jersey Coastal Heritage Trail Route.
Cape May Point		Lower Township; 38°55′59″N 74°57′39″W	Cape May	1972	244 acres (0.99 km^{2})	The site of Cape May Lighthouse (1859); premier location in North America for observing fall bird migration to the south.
Cheesequake		Old Bridge Township; 40°26′06″N 74°16′13″W	Middlesex	1940	1,610 acres (6.5 km^{2})	Transitional zone between two different ecosystems featuring open fields, saltwater and freshwater marshes, Pine Barrens white cedar swamp, and northeastern hardwood forest.
Corson's Inlet		Ocean City,Strathmere, and Upper Township; 39°13′02″N 74°38′47″W	Cape May	1963	341 acres (1.38 km^{2})	One of the last undeveloped tracts along the state's oceanfront; features primary and secondary sand dune systems, shoreline overwash, marine estuaries; migratory and residential wildlife species; hiking, fishing, crabbing, boating and sunbathing.
Delaware and Raritan Canal		Various towns in Central Jersey; 40°22′07″N 74°36′58″W	Hunterdon Mercer Middlesex Somerset	1974	6,595 acres (26.69 km^{2})	Delaware and Raritan Canal mileage including the 36-mile (58 km) main canal between New Brunswick and Trenton and 22-mile (35 km) feeder canal between Trenton and Frenchtown; many historic structures including buildings, locks, spillways, and towpath; described as "the longest (and narrowest) recreation area in the state. A greenway that snakes through one of the most heavily populated regions in the world."
Double Trouble		Berkeley and Lacey Townships; 39°53′52″N 74°13′17″W	Ocean	1964	8,495 acres (34.38 km^{2})	Provides "a window into the Pine Barrens history" and region's ecosystem; preserved historic village associated with New Jersey cranberry agriculture and Atlantic White Cedar logging and milling industries.
Farny		Rockaway Township; 40°57′45″N 74°27′29″W	Morris	1943	4,866 acres (19.69 km^{2})	Adjacent to Splitrock Reservoir; features mature mixed oak hardwood forest, swamps, and streams characteristic of the Highlands physiographic province; provides habitat for the endangered red-shouldered hawk and threatened barred owl.
Fort Mott		Pennsville Township; 39°36′11″N 75°33′09″W	Salem	1951	124 acres (0.50 km^{2})	Coastal defense battery built 1872–1902 to protect the Delaware River and Philadelphia after the American Civil War. Troops were stationed at site from 1897 to 1922.
Hacklebarney		Chester and Washington Townships; 40°44′53″N 74°43′56″W	Morris	1924	1,186 acres (4.80 km^{2})	The glacial valley and gorge of the Black River; features the rock strewn landscape of the glacial moraine from the Wisconsinan glaciation; features three endangered species: American ginseng, leatherwood and Virginia pennywort
High Point		Montague and Wantage Townships; 41°17′N 74°41′W	Sussex	1923	16,091 acres (65.12 km^{2})	Donated by Colonel Anthony R. Kuser and wife Susie Dryden Kuser; landscaping designed by the Olmsted Brothers of Boston, sons of Frederick Law Olmsted, designer of New York City's Central Park. Features the highest elevation in New Jersey, High Point, a 1,803-foot (550 m) prominence of Kittatinny Mountain marked by a 220-foot (67 m) granite obelisk erected as veterans memorial.
Hopatcong		Hopatcong and Roxbury Township; 40°54′52″N 74°39′55″W	Morris Sussex	1922	163 acres (0.66 km^{2})	Two separate parcels of land, one on the southwestern shore of state's largest freshwater lake, Lake Hopatcong, another on Lake Musconetcong; the park features remnants of the Morris Canal and Lake Hopatcong Historical Museum.
Island Beach		Berkeley Township; 39°54′19″N 74°04′53″W	Ocean	1953	3,003 acres (12.15 km^{2})	Island Beach is a narrow 10-mile (16 km) barrier island between Atlantic Ocean and Barnegat Bay featuring untouched primary dunes, thicket, freshwater wetlands, maritime forest and tidal marshes; also New Jersey's largest osprey colony, peregrine falcons, wading birds, shorebirds, waterfowl, and migrating songbirds.
Kittatinny Valley		Andover and Andover Township; 41°00′59″N 74°44′38″W	Sussex	1994	5,656 acres (22.89 km^{2})	Features glacial lakes and limestone outcroppings at the headwaters of the Pequest River; part of the Sussex Branch Trail passes through park; site of the Aeroflex–Andover Airport, a New Jersey Forest Fire Service airbase for aerial wildfire suppression.
Liberty		Jersey City; 40°42′14″N 74°03′13″W	Hudson	1976	1,212 acres (4.90 km^{2})	Created to commemorate country's bicentennial celebration, features Central Railroad of New Jersey Terminal (CRRNJ); sweeping view of the Hudson River and Manhattan skyline; Liberty Science Center; "Empty Sky" Memorial for the September 11 terrorist attacks; ferry service to Ellis Island and the Statue of Liberty.
Long Pond Ironworks		West Milford; 41°08′28″N 74°18′33″W	Passaic	1974	6,911 acres (27.97 km^{2})	Features Monksville Reservoir and ruins of Long Pond Ironworks, an eighteenth- and nineteenth-century ironworking community (1766–1882) along the Wanaque River.
Monmouth Battlefield		Freehold and Manalapan Townships; 40°15′22″N 74°19′15″W	Monmouth	1961	1,818 acres (7.36 km^{2})	Site of the June 28, 1778, Battle of Monmouth during the American Revolution. George Washington and Continental Army attacked the rear of a British Army column commanded by Lieutenant General Sir Henry Clinton; features interpretative center, annual reenactment battle held in June, the Craig House (1746), the Rhea-Applegate house (1745), and a pick-your-own fruit orchard.
Parvin		Pittsgrove Township; 39°30′39″N 75°07′58″W	Salem	1931	2,092 acres (8.47 km^{2})	Features Pine Barrens swamp hardwood and pine forest ecosystem along Muddy Run (Maurice River tributary). Features over 200 flowering plant species including blossoming dogwood, laurel, holly, magnolia, wild azalea. Historically, the home of a CCC camp (1933–1941), summer displacement camp for Japanese-American children during World War II; prisoner-of-war camp for German soldiers, and housing for Kalmyk refugees who escaped Eastern Europe and the USSR in 1952.
Pigeon Swamp		South Brunswick; 40°23′13″N 74°28′26″W	Middlesex		1,078 acres (4.36 km^{2})	Located in the watershed of Lawrence Brook, an undeveloped park featuring open ponds and hardwood forests that were a major nesting site for the now-extinct passenger pigeon.
Princeton Battlefield		Princeton; 40°19′51″N 74°40′37″W	Mercer	1777	681 acres (2.76 km^{2})	Site of the Battle of Princeton fought between British and American on January 3, 1777 — a victory that proved decisive in restoring American morale during American Revolution. Includes the Clarke House where General Hugh Mercer died from his wounds nine days later despite the efforts of Dr. Benjamin Rush.
Rancocas		Westampton; 40°00′27″N 74°50′00″W	Burlington	1965	1,252 acres (5.07 km^{2})	Located along the North Branch of the Rancocas Creek and an extensive freshwater tidal marsh.
Ringwood		Ringwood; 41°08′11″N 74°15′22″W	Passaic	1937	4,444 acres (17.98 km^{2})	Located on Ramapo Mountain, features historic Ringwood Manor, New Jersey Botanical Garden at Skylands Manor, and Shepherd Lake Recreation Area.
Stephens		Hackettstown and Mount Olive Township; 40°52′09″N 74°48′36″W	Morris Warren	1937	805 acres (3.26 km^{2})	Located along Musconetcong River, features remnants of one of 23 locks and section of towpath of the Morris Canal. Highlands Trail runs through the park.
Stow Creek		Bridgeton	Cumberland		1,091 acres (4.42 km^{2})	
Swartswood		Stillwater Township; 41°04′25″N 74°49′08″W	Sussex	1914	3,460 acres (14.0 km^{2})	New Jersey's first state park. The focus of the park was a place for recreation at the state's third-largest freshwater lake, Swartswood Lake (a glacial lake).
Tall Pines State Preserve		Deptford and Mantua Townships; 39°46′41″N 75°08′31″W	Gloucester	2015	110 acres (0.45 km^{2})	Former golf course with over 4 miles of asphalt and grass walking trails through unmaintained natural areas. Mantua Creek runs through its center.
Voorhees	lakeside pavilion at Voorhees State Park in New Jersey in autumn foliage	Glen Gardner; 40°41′46″N 74°53′14″W	Hunterdon	1927	1,336 acres (5.41 km^{2})	Former New Jersey governor Foster M. Voorhees created the park with donation of his 325-acre (1.32 km^{2}) farm; scenic views of Round Valley Reservoir and Spruce Run Reservoir; an observatory and astronomy education center, operated by the New Jersey Astronomical Association, offers the largest working telescope accessible to the public in the state—a 26-inch Cassegrain reflector.
Washington Crossing		Hopewell Township; 40°18′40″N 74°51′49″W	Mercer	1912	3,575 acres (14.47 km^{2})	Commemorates site where General George Washington and the Continental Army crossed the Delaware River on the night of December 25–26, 1776, before the Battle of Trenton during the American Revolution.
Washington Rock	Winter view from Washington Rock State Park	Green Brook Township; 40°36′48″N 74°28′24″W	Somerset	1932	52 acres (0.21 km^{2})	Site of a lookout used by George Washington in 1777 monitor British troop movements around New York City and northern New Jersey when the Continental Army was stationed at the Middlebrook encampment.
Wawayanda		Vernon Township and West Milford; 41°11′53″N 74°23′52″W	Passaic Sussex	1960	35,524 acres (143.76 km^{2})	Wawayanda offers 60 miles (97 km) of trails including a 20-mile (32 km) segment of the Appalachian Trail. Features 1,325-acre (5.36 km^{2}) Bearfort Mountain Natural Area, 399-acre (1.61 km^{2}) Wawayanda Hemlock Ravine Natural Area (399 acres (1.61 km^{2})), and 2,167-acre (8.77 km^{2}) Wawayanda Swamp Natural Area

== Future state parks ==
Park name	Image	Location	County	Year established	Size	Remarks
Capital		Trenton	Mercer	2006	-	Park currently being developed, includes buildings and areas of Trenton's capitol complex, waterfront areas along Delaware River and Assunpink Creek; celebrate Trenton's Native American, Colonial, Revolutionary War, ethnic, and industrial heritage

== State forests ==
Forest name	Image	Location	County	Year established	Size	Features and activities
Abram S. Hewitt	A group of hikers overlook a lake in Abram S. Hewitt State Forest in New Jersey.	West Milford; 41°11′09″N 74°19′53″W	Passaic	1951	2,001 acres (8.10 km^{2})	Accessible only by foot, this park is located on Bearfort Mountain, the eastern terminus of the Wawayanda Plateau, between Greenwood Lake and Upper Greenwood Lake and features a portion of the Appalachian Trail
Bass River	View of densely-vegetated Atlantic White Cedar bog at Bass River State Forest	39°37′14″N 74°25′29″W	Burlington	1906	29,147 acres (117.95 km^{2})	Bass River is New Jersey's first state forest. Features the 67-acre (0.27 km^{2}) man-made Lake Absegami, the remains of the Civilian Conservation Corps Camp S-55 (1933–1942), a 3,830 acres (15.5 km^{2}) portion of Pine Barrens pygmy forest in the West Pine Plains Natural Area, and the pine/oak woods and a small Atlantic white cedar bog of the Absegami Natural Area
Belleplain	Acadian Flycatcher at Belleplain State Forest in New Jersey, during spring migration 2008.	Woodbine; 39°14′57″N 74°50′28″W	Cape May Cumberland	1928	21,324 acres (86.30 km^{2})	Features young pine, oak and Atlantic white cedar, and the remains of three CCC camps, and Lake Nummy, formerly the Meisle Cranberry Bog
Brendan T. Byrne	"Cranberry Bog in the middle of Brendan T. Byrne State Forest	Woodland Township; 39°53′28″N 74°34′47″W	Ocean	1908	37,242 acres (150.71 km^{2})	Features the site of Lebanon Glass Works (1851–1867); Whitesbog Village, an active nineteenth- and twentieth-century cranberry and blueberry producing community where the high bush blueberry was developed.
Jenny Jump		Hope Township; 40°55′19″N 74°55′32″W	Warren	1931	4,466 acres (18.07 km^{2})	The park features the 1,112-foot (339 m) high, 6-mile (10 km) long Jenny Jump Mountain ridge, large glacial boulders and outcroppings from the Wisconsin glaciation, and because the area enjoys the darkest skies in New Jersey, the park is home to the United Astronomy Clubs of New Jersey's Greenwood Observatory, open for public stargazing.
Norvin Green		Bloomingdale, Ringwood and West Milford; 41°04′08″N 74°19′32″W	Passaic	1946	5,416 acres (21.92 km^{2})	Located near Wanaque Reservoir and part of the Wyanokie Wilderness Area, this state forest features Wyanokie High Point and views of the Manhattan skyline is part of the Northeastern coastal forests ecoregion and accessible only by foot.
Penn		Washington Township; 39°44′04.90″N 74°29′28.82″W	Burlington	1910	3,366 acres (13.62 km^{2})	Features Oswego Lake and River and a former Civilian Conservation Corps camp, as well as part of New Jersey's pygmy forest.
Ramapo Mountain		Various towns 41°01′58″N 74°15′07″W	Bergen Passaic	-	4,269 acres (17.28 km^{2})	Former estate of Clifford MacEvoy on Ramapo Mountain, includes the 120-acre (0.49 km^{2}) Ramapo Lake Natural Area
Stokes		Frankford, Montague, and Sandyston Townships; 41°11′04″N 74°47′50″W	Sussex	1917	16,025 acres (64.85 km^{2})	Created with a donation of land by New Jersey Governor Edward C. Stokes, this state forest on Kittatinny Mountain includes the Tillman Ravine Natural Area, and New Jersey School of Conservation (operated by Montclair State University)
Wharton	Kayaking on the Mullica River, pine trees in background	Various towns 39°38′38″N 74°38′48″W	Burlington Camden Atlantic	1954	115,000 acres (470 km^{2})	New Jersey's largest state forest, features the Atlantic coastal pine barrens ecoregion as well as the New Jersey Pinelands National Reserve, and the watershed of the Mullica River, including historic Batsto Village, a former bog iron and glass manufacturing site from 1766 to 1867, and extensive hiking trails.
Worthington		Hardwick and Knowlton Townships; 40°59′36″N 75°05′08″W	Warren	1954	6,421 acres (25.98 km^{2})	Part of the former estate of Charles Campbell Worthington, features Mount Tammany (elevation 1,527 feet (465 m)), the New Jersey side of the Delaware Water Gap and southern areas of Kittatinny Mountain, including the 1,085-acre (4.39 km^{2}) Dunnfield Creek Natural Area (a Wild Trout stream) and Sunfish Pond, a glacial lake

== Recreation areas ==
Recreation area name	Image	Location	County	Date established	Size	Description
Atsion		Shamong Township; 39°44′28″N 74°43′59″W	Burlington	-	-	Located in Wharton State Forest
Bulls Island		Delaware Township; 40°24′35″N 75°02′14″W	Hunterdon	-	80 acres (0.32 km^{2})	Located in Delaware and Raritan Canal State Park
Round Valley		Clinton and Lebanon Townships; 40°36′50″N 74°49′22″W	Hunterdon	1968	3,684 acres (14.91 km^{2})	Trails for hiking, horseback riding, and mountain biking; camping, fishing, hunting (waterfowl only), picnicking, boating/canoeing (gas motors limited 10 hp), swimming, scuba and skin diving, cross-country skiing, ice fishing, sledding
Spruce Run		Clinton and Union Townships; 40°39′46″N 74°56′20″W	Hunterdon	1974	1,290 acres (5.2 km^{2})	-
Warren Grove	-	Warren Grove; 39°45′12.29″N 74°23′13.9″W	Burlington	1972	617 acres (2.50 km^{2})	Administered by the Bass River State Forest, this site was acquired from the National Park Service in 1972. This site is part of what is known as the "Pygmy Forest", featuring the groves of Pitch Pine that is part of the Dwarf Pine Plains Habitat in the New Jersey Pine Barrens. Features the endangered broom crowberry (Corema conradii) and other rare plant species.

== State marinas ==
Marina	Image	Location	Berths	Maximum vessel length	Draft	Description	Links
Forked River	-	Forked River in Lacey Township, Ocean County; 39°50′05.59″N 74°11′42.07″W	125	50 feet (15 m)	6 feet (1.8 m)	Access to Atlantic Ocean via Barnegat Inlet, near "BB" Buoy, Barnegat Bay and the Intracoastal Waterway	
Fortescue	-	Fortescue, Downe Township, Cumberland County; 39°14′36″N 75°10′21″W	125	50 feet (15 m)	9 feet (2.7 m)	Access to Delaware Bay and Atlantic Ocean.	
Leonardo	-	Leonardo in Middletown Township, Monmouth County; 40°25′20.74″N 74°03′40.26″W	176	50 feet (15 m)	6 feet (1.8 m)	Located next to Sandy Hook, access to the Atlantic Ocean and New York Bay	
Island Beach	-	Seaside Park, Ocean County	80	31 feet (9.4 m)	-		
Liberty Landing	-	Liberty State Park in Jersey City, Hudson County; 40°42′35.46″N 74°03′05.40″W	200	50 feet (15 m)	18 feet (5.5 m)	Located in Liberty State Park across from Manhattan, with access to Liberty Science Center, and by ferry to the Statue of Liberty, Ellis Island and New York City.	
Senator Frank S. Farley	-	Atlantic City, Atlantic County; 39°22′40.30″N 74°25′47.58″W	640	300 feet (91 m)	12 feet (3.7 m)	Located on Clam Creek and Huron Avenue across the street from the Golden Nugget (formerly Trump Marina Hotel and Casino) in Atlantic City, access to the Atlantic Ocean through Absecon Inlet or the Intracoastal Waterway	

== Golf courses ==
Golf course	Image	Location	Description	Links
Centerton	-	Pittsgrove Township, Salem County	-	
Cream Ridge	-	Cream Ridge, Monmouth County	-	
Spring Meadow	-	Farmingdale, Monmouth County	-	
White Oaks	-	Newfield, Gloucester County	-	

== State-owned historic sites ==
These are state-owned historical sites in New Jersey.

Historical site	Image	Location	County	Built	Acquired	Description
Absecon Lighthouse		Atlantic City; 39°21′58″N 74°24′50″W	Atlantic	1856	-	-
Allaire Village		Wall Township 40°09′31″N 74°07′44″W	Monmouth	1750	1941	Located within Allaire State Park
Atsion Mansion		Shamong Township	Burlington	1826	1955	Greek Revival summer home of ironmaster Samuel Richards
Barnegat Lighthouse		Barnegat Light 39°45′52″N 74°06′22″W	Ocean	1835	1944	Located within Barnegat Lighthouse State Park
Batsto Village		Washington Township 39°38′30″N 74°38′52″W	Burlington	1766	1954	Located within Wharton State Forest
Boxwood Hall		Elizabeth 40°39′49″N 74°12′37″W	Union	About 1750	1930s	Home of Elias Boudinot, president of the Continental Congress; site of George Washington's luncheon before his inauguration; home of Jonathan Dayton, signer of the Declaration of Independence
Cape May Lighthouse		Lower Township 38°55′59″N 74°57′37″W	Cape May	1859	1992	Located within Cape May Point State Park
Carranza Memorial		Tabernacle Township 39°46′38.6″N 74°37′56.6″W	Burlington	1931	-	Located within Wharton State Forest
Central Railroad of New Jersey Terminal		Jersey City 40°42′30″N 74°02′39″W	Hudson	1889	1965	Located within Liberty State Park
Clarke House		Princeton 40°19′44″N 74°40′29″W	Mercer	1772	1946	Farmhouse that served as a hospital where General Hugh Mercer died, located within Princeton Battlefield State Park
Craig House		Freehold Township 40°16′29″N 74°17′51″W	Monmouth	1746	1965	Farmhouse located in Monmouth Battlefield State Park
Delaware and Raritan Canal		Various towns in Central Jersey	Hunterdon Mercer Middlesex Somerset	1834	1974	Located within Delaware and Raritan Canal State Park
Double Trouble Village	-	Bayville	Ocean	1909	1964	Located within Double Trouble State Park
Drumthwacket		Princeton	Mercer	1835	1966	
Edison Memorial Tower	-	Edison	Middlesex	1938	-	-
Fort Mott	-	Pennsville Township	Salem	1900	1947	-
Grover Cleveland Birthplace		Caldwell	Essex	1832	1934	-
Hancock House		Hancock's Bridge	Salem	1734	1931	Quaker home and site of a massacre during the American Revolution
Hereford Inlet Lighthouse		North Wildwood	Cape May	1874	1960	
The Hermitage		Ho-Ho-Kus	Bergen	1848	1970	A stone house where George Washington stayed during the American Revolutionary War, it was later the site of the wedding of Aaron Burr and Theodosia Prevost. Now a museum.
High Point Monument		Wantage and Montague Townships	Sussex	1930	1930	Located within High Point State Park
Indian King Tavern		Haddonfield	Camden	1750	1903	
James Lawrence House		Burlington	Burlington	-	-	Childhood home of Naval Captain James Lawrence
Dr. James Sill Office						
Johnson Ferry House		Washington Crossing; 40°17′57″N 74°52′05″W	Mercer	1700s	-	Washington Crossing State Park
Keens Mill						
Long Pond Ironworks Historic District		West Milford	Passaic	1766	-	-
Lusscroft Farm		Wantage Township	Sussex	1914	1931	
The Marshall House						
Monmouth Battlefield		Manalapan and Freehold Townships	Monmouth	1778	1961	Site of the June 28, 1778, Battle of Monmouth during the American Revolutionary War where the legend of Molly Pitcher (Mary Hays) started, located within Monmouth Battlefield State Park
Monocacy Battle Monument						
Navesink Twin Lights		Highlands; 40°23′46.4″N 73°59′8.8″W	Monmouth	1862	1962	A twin light station that guided ships into New York Harbor and was the first use of Fresnel lenses in the United States.
Old Dutch Parsonage		Somerville	Somerset	1751	1947	Home of two local Dutch Reformed clergymen, John Frelinghuysen and Jacob Rutsen Hardenbergh - who served as the first president of Queen's College (now Rutgers), and Frederick Frelinghuysen, a Revolutionary War officer, later a Senator
Prallsville Mills		Prallsville	Hunterdon	1790	1974	Located within Delaware and Raritan Canal State Park
Princeton Battle Monument						
Princeton Battlefield		Princeton 40°19′44″N 74°40′29″W	Mercer	1777	1946	Site of an American victory during the Revolutionary War, located within Princeton Battlefield State Park
Proprietary House						
Ringwood Manor		Ringwood	Passaic	1739	1966	Manor of ironmaster Robert Erskine, who served George Washington, located within Ringwood State Park
Rockingham		Franklin Township	Somerset	c. 1710	1935	-
Skylands Manor		Ringwood	Passaic	1922	1966	Located within Ringwood State Park
Somers Mansion		Somers Point	Atlantic	1725	-	-
Steuben House		River Edge	Bergen	1752	1928	-
Trenton Battle Monument		Trenton	Mercer	1893	-	-
Van Nest-Hoff-Vannatta Farm						
Wallace House		Somerville; 40°34′8″N 74°37′19″W	Somerset	1776	1947	An eight-room Georgian mansion built on the "Hope Farm" estate of John Wallace in 1778–79. During the second Middlebrook encampment, George Washington used the home as his headquarters in the first half of 1779 and used it to host foreign dignitaries and plan military strategy during the American Revolution.
Walt Whitman House		Camden; 39°56′33″N 75°07′26″W	Camden	c. 1848	1947	The final residence of poet Walt Whitman
Washington Crossing		Hopewell Township; 40°18′40″N 74°51′49″W	Mercer	-	-	New Jersey location of George Washington's crossing of the Delaware River leading up to the Battle of Trenton on December 26, 1776, includes Washington Crossing Historic Park in Pennsylvania, located within Washington Crossing State Park
Waterloo Village		Byram Township; 40°54′56″N 74°45′22″W	Sussex	1820	1966	Restored eighteenth- and nineteenth-century village associated with the iron industry and Morris Canal, located in Allamuchy Mountain State Park
Whitesbog Village		Browns Mills	Burlington	1870s	1908	-

== See also ==
- List of New Jersey wildlife management areas
- List of Registered Historic Places in New Jersey
- Palisades Interstate Park - a protected area overseen by both New York and New Jersey along the Hudson River.
