= Barnegat Lighthouse State Park =

Park on Long Beach Island in Ocean County, New Jersey, US

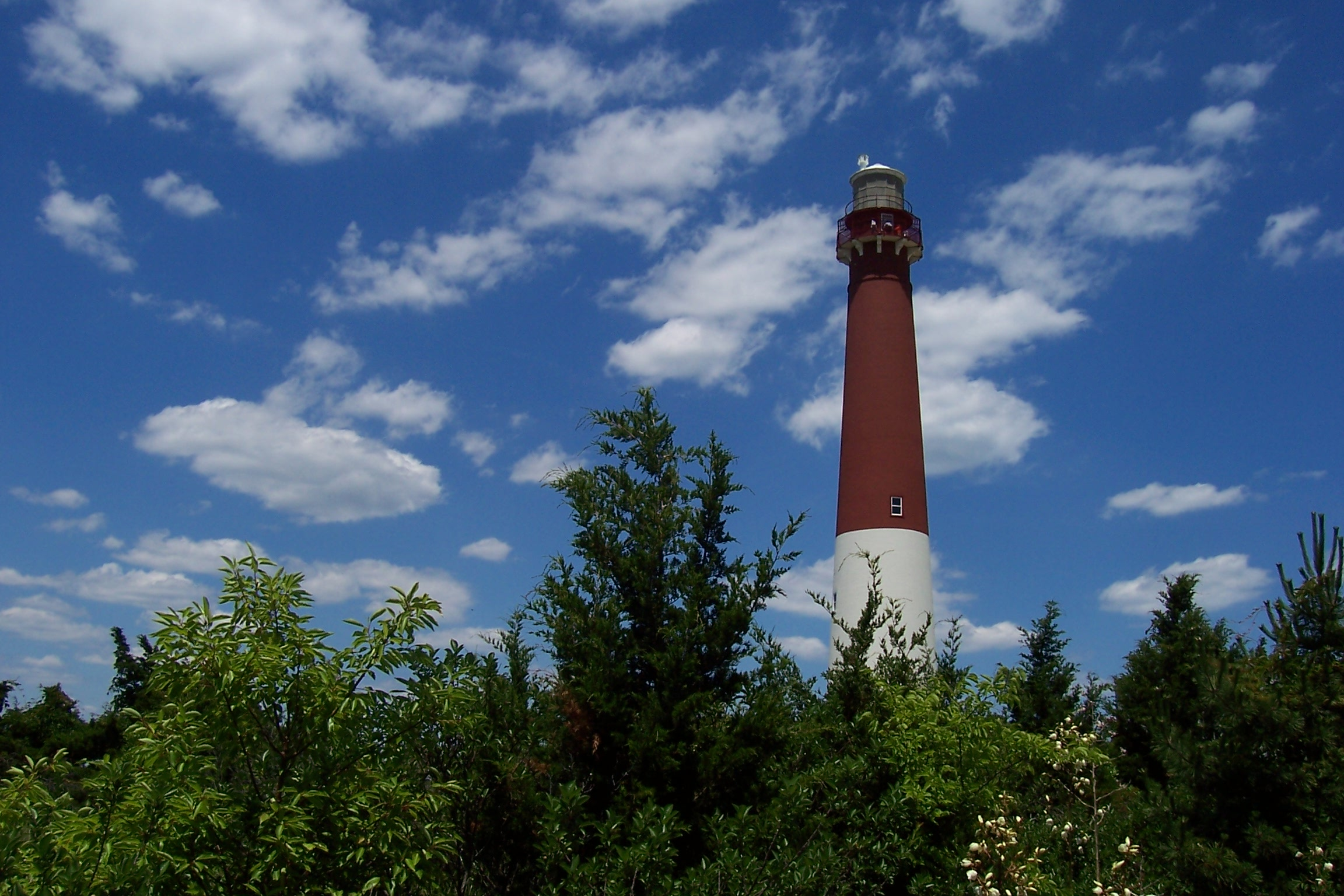

- Location within New Jersey Location within the United States
- Location: Ocean County, New Jersey, United States
- Coordinates: 39°45′47″N 74°06′29″W
- Area: 0.13 acres (0.053 ha)
- Established: 1951
- Operator: New Jersey Division of Parks and Forestry
- Website: Official website

Barnegat Lighthouse State Park is located on the northern tip of Long Beach Island in Ocean County, New Jersey, United States. The area where the lighthouse stands was regarded as one of the most important navigational points for ships bound to and from New York Harbor. The ships were dependent upon the Barnegat Lighthouse to avoid the shoals extending from the shoreline. The fast currents, shifting sandbars, and offshore shoals challenged sailors. The park is included as a maritime site on the New Jersey Coastal Heritage Trail. The park is operated and maintained by the New Jersey Division of Parks and Forestry.

== Features ==
=== Barnegat Lighthouse ===
The lighthouse is a popular tourist site due to its view of the surrounding areas. The lighthouse is open seasonally, weather permitting.

=== Trails ===
The Maritime Forest Trail is a 1/5-mile long, self-guided loop trail through maritime forest on Long Beach Island, classified as easy to moderate.

=== Interpretive Center ===
The Barnegat Lighthouse Interpretive Center is open to those wishing to learn the history and environment surrounding the Barnegat Lighthouse.
