= List of New Jersey wildlife management areas =

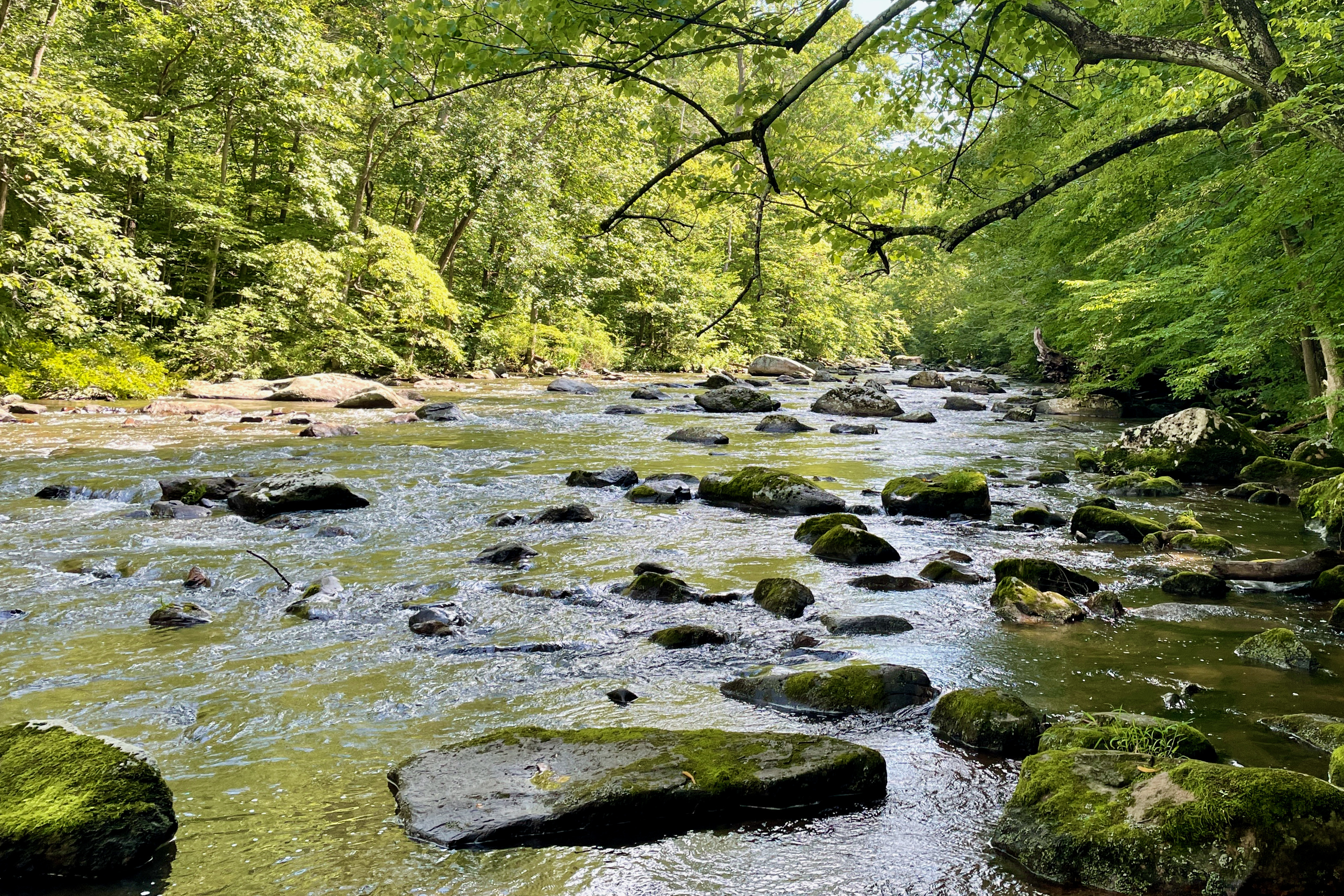
Ken Lockwood Gorge Wildlife Management Area

The state of New Jersey in the United States owns and administers over 354,000 acres (1,430 km^{2}) of land designated as "Wildlife Management Areas" (abbreviated as "WMA") throughout the state. These areas are managed by the New Jersey Division of Fish and Wildlife, an agency in the New Jersey Department of Environmental Protection. These protected areas are not part of the state's public parks and forests system, and while managed as fish and wildlife habitat with a focus on recreational fishing and hunting activities, these multi-use sites are also "prime locations for birding, wildlife viewing and photography, cross country skiing, hiking and mountain biking". All individuals partaking in these activities should familiarize themselves with all local fishing and hunting regulations, found on the NJDEP website as well as New Jersey wildlife management area regulations which can also be found on the NJDEP website. WMA regulations include restricted hours, motor vehicle, boating, biking, and horseback riding guidelines, among other restrictions and regulations. According to state wildlife education specialist Paul Tarlowe, the wildlife management areas reflect the varied and diverse terrain across the state, including "extremely rugged terrain (Wildcat Ridge WMA) to level woods roads (along the South Branch of the Raritan River through Ken Lockwood Gorge WMA) to sandy tracts in the Pinelands (Greenwood Forest and Stafford Forge WMAs) to coastal marshes (Cape May Wetlands WMA)." As of July 2015, there are 121 areas throughout the state and new properties and additions to existing properties are continually being added.

A majority of the wildlife management area properties are acquired through funding raised through the state's Green Acres Program. In association with public and private entities, the program aims to create "a system of interconnected open spaces, whose protection will preserve and enhance New Jersey's natural environment and its historic, scenic, and recreational resources for public use and enjoyment."

Several of the state's wildlife management areas are stocked with fish or game. Pheasants are raised at the Rockport Pheasant Farm and various fish species (including trout) are hatched and raised at the Pequest Trout Hatchery and Natural Resource Education Center and Charles O. Hayford State Fish Hatchery. All three facilities are located near Hackettstown in Warren County and operated by the Division of Fish and Wildlife. No state tax dollars are used to fund these facility's operations and the costs are raised through the sale of pheasant/quail stamps or trout stamp endorsements to state-issued hunting or fishing licenses to hunters and anglers.

== List of wildlife management areas ==
Wildlife Management Area	Location	Area
Abbotts Meadow Wildlife Management Area	Salem County	1,460.98 acres (591.24 ha)
Absecon Wildlife Management Area	Atlantic County	3,946.05 acres (1,596.91 ha)
Alexauken Creek Wildlife Management Area	Hunterdon County	689.24 acres (278.93 ha)
Alpha Grasslands Preserve Wildlife Management Area	Warren County	128.00 acres (51.80 ha)
Amwell Lake Wildlife Management Area	Hunterdon County	85.41 acres (34.56 ha)
Andaloro Wildlife Management Area	Gloucester County	53.00 acres (21.45 ha)
Assunpink Wildlife Management Area	Monmouth County	6,373.44 acres (2,579.24 ha)
Baldwin Lake Wildlife Management Area	Mercer County	47.33 acres (19.15 ha)
Bear Swamp Wildlife Management Area	Sussex County	2,976.91 acres (1,204.71 ha)
Beaver Brook Wildlife Management Area	Warren County	606.92 acres (245.61 ha)
Beaver Swamp Wildlife Management Area (Note: includes separate North and South tracts)	Cape May County	2,930.69 acres (1,186.01 ha)
Belvidere Access Wildlife Management Area	Warren County	7.15 acres (2.89 ha)
Berkshire Valley Wildlife Management Area	Morris County	2,030.33 acres (821.65 ha)
Black River Wildlife Management Area	Chester Township, Morris County	3,077.77 acres (1,245.53 ha)
Buckhorn Creek Wildlife Management Area	Warren County	682.94 acres (276.38 ha)
Buckshutem Wildlife Management Area	Cumberland County	4,003.40 acres (1,620.12 ha)
Budd Lake Wildlife Management Area	Morris County	80.00 acres (32.37 ha)
Butterfly Bogs Wildlife Management Area	Ocean County	165.83 acres (67.11 ha)
Cape Island Wildlife Management Area (Note: includes separate North and South tracts)	Cape May County	415.45 acres (168.13 ha)
Cape May Coastal Wetlands Wildlife Management Area (Note: includes separate Cape May, Cape May Courthouse, Marmora, Sea Isle City, Wildwood tracts)	Cape May County	17,417.41 acres (7,048.58 ha)
Capoolong Creek Wildlife Management Area	Hunterdon County	67.61 acres (27.36 ha)
Cedar Lake Wildlife Management Area	Atlantic County	329.18 acres (133.21 ha)
Cedarville Ponds Wildlife Management Area	Cumberland County	42.18 acres (17.07 ha)
Clarks Pond Wildlife Management Area	Cumberland County	201.19 acres (81.42 ha)
Clinton Wildlife Management Area (Note: includes separate east and west tracts)	Hunterdon County	2,021.17 acres (817.94 ha)
Cohansey River Wildlife Management Area	Cumberland County	992.94 acres (401.83 ha)
Colliers Mills Wildlife Management Area	Ocean County	12,906.63 acres (5,223.13 ha)
Columbia Wildlife Management Area	Warren County	1,098.07 acres (444.37 ha)
Cox Hall Creek Wildlife Management Area	Cape May County	315.6 acres (127.7 ha)
Culvers Brook Access Wildlife Management Area	Sussex County	4.13 acres (1.67 ha)
Dennis Creek Wildlife Management Area	Cape May County	8,086.70 acres (3,272.57 ha)
Dix Wildlife Management Area	Cumberland County	4,657.24 acres (1,884.72 ha)
D.O.D. Ponds Wildlife Management Area (Note: on lease from the United States Army)	Salem County	335.54 acres (135.79 ha)
Egg Island Wildlife Management Area	Cumberland County	8,991.91 acres (3,638.90 ha)
Elmer Lake Wildlife Management Area	Salem County	385.80 acres (156.13 ha)
Featherbed Lane Wildlife Management Area	Salem County	190.65 acres (77.15 ha)
Flatbrook-Roy Wildlife Management Area	Sussex County	2,092.85 acres (846.95 ha)
Forked River Mt. Wildlife Management Area	Ocean County	4,370.07 acres (1,768.50 ha)
Fortescue Wildlife Management Area	Cumberland County	1,297.92 acres (525.25 ha)
Gibson Creek Wildlife Management Area (Note: combined into Maple Lake Wildlife Management Area)	Atlantic County	-
Glassboro Wildlife Management Area	Gloucester County	2,392.90 acres (968.37 ha)
Great Bay Boulevard Wildlife Management Area	Ocean County	5,976.43 acres (2,418.58 ha)
Great Egg Harbor River Wildlife Management Area (Note: includes separate Buena Vista 1, Buena Vista 2, Folsom, Hamilton, Hamilton South, Weymouth tracts)	Atlantic County	5,635.77 acres (2,280.72 ha)
Greenwood Forest Wildlife Management Area	Ocean County	32,148.26 acres (13,009.94 ha)
Gum Tree Corner Wildlife Management Area	Salem and Cumberland counties	2,223.78 acres (899.93 ha)
Hackettstown Hatchery Wildlife Management Area	Warren County	235.18 acres (95.17 ha)
Hainesville Wildlife Management Area	Sussex County	643.84 acres (260.55 ha)
Hamburg Mountain Wildlife Management Area	Sussex County	3,644.05 acres (1,474.69 ha)
Hammonton Creek Wildlife Management Area (Note: includes separate East and West tracts)	Atlantic County	4,073.92 acres (1,648.66 ha)
Harmony Access Wildlife Management Area	Warren County	26.88 acres (10.88 ha)
Harrisonville Lake Wildlife Management Area	Salem and Gloucester counties	295.90 acres (119.75 ha)
Heislerville Wildlife Management Area	Cumberland County	7,209.91 acres (2,917.75 ha)
Higbee Beach Wildlife Management Area	Cape May County	1,152.12 acres (466.25 ha)
Holland Church Access Wildlife Management Area	Hunterdon County	21.49 acres (8.70 ha)
Honey Run Wildlife Management Area	Warren County	134.08 acres (54.26 ha)
Hummers Beach Access Wildlife Management Area	Warren County	3.20 acres (1.29 ha)
Imlaystown Lake Wildlife Management Area	Monmouth County	30.00 acres (12.14 ha)
Ken Lockwood Gorge Wildlife Management Area	Hunterdon County	498.76 acres (201.84 ha)
Knowlton Access Wildlife Management Area	Warren County	14.20 acres (5.75 ha)
Little Flatbrook Access Wildlife Management Area	Sussex County	6.57 acres (2.66 ha)
Lizard Tail Swamp Preserve Wildlife Management Area	Cape May County	378.99 acres (153.37 ha)
Lockatong Wildlife Management Area	Hunterdon County	764.56 acres (309.41 ha)
Logan Pond Wildlife Management Area	Gloucester County	86.95 acres (35.19 ha)
Mad Horse Creek Wildlife Management Area	Salem County	9,388.83 acres (3,799.52 ha)
Makepeace Lake Wildlife Management Area	Atlantic County	11,625.77 acres (4,704.78 ha)
Malibu Beach Wildlife Management Area	Atlantic County	95.70 acres (38.73 ha)
Manahawkin Wildlife Management Area	Ocean County	1,642.00 acres (664.49 ha)
Manasquan River Wildlife Management Area	Ocean and Monmouth counties	744.33 acres (301.22 ha)
Manchester Wildlife Management Area	Ocean County	3,802.00 acres (1,538.61 ha)
Mantua Creek Wildlife Management Area	Gloucester County	107.33 acres (43.43 ha)
Maple Lake Wildlife Management Area	Atlantic County	4,862.14 acres (1,967.64 ha)
Maskells Mill Pond Wildlife Management Area	Salem County	1,155.60 acres (467.65 ha)
Medford Wildlife Management Area	Burlington County	214.07 acres (86.63 ha)
Menantico Ponds Wildlife Management Area	Cumberland County	474.14 acres (191.88 ha)
Millville (Bevans) Wildlife Management Area	Cumberland County County	16,373.29 acres (6,626.04 ha)
Musconetcong River Wildlife Management Area (Note: includes separate Bethlehem, Butlers Park, Hackettstown, Holland, Lebanon, Pohatcong, Washington tracts)	Hunterdon, Morris, and Warren counties	1,555.98 acres (629.68 ha)
Nantuxent Wildlife Management Area	Cumberland County	1,098.73 acres (444.64 ha)
Navesink River Wildlife Management Area	Monmouth County	66.93 acres (27.09 ha)
New Sweden Wildlife Management Area	Cumberland County	2,684.05 acres (1,086.20 ha)
Oyster Creek Access Wildlife Management Area	Ocean County	14.11 acres (5.71 ha)
Paulinskill River Wildlife Management Area	Sussex County	2,523.36 acres (1,021.17 ha)
Peaslee Wildlife Management Area	Cumberland and Cape May counties	33,887.14 acres (13,713.64 ha)
Pemberton Lake Wildlife Management Area	Burlington County	81.75 acres (33.08 ha)
Penbryn Pond Wildlife Management Area	Camden County	354.63 acres (143.51 ha)
Pennsauken Access Wildlife Management Area	Camden County	0.68 acres (0.28 ha)
Pequest Wildlife Management Area	Warren County	5,054.92 acres (2,045.65 ha)
Pleasant Run Wildlife Management Area	Burlington, Mercer, and Monmouth counties	500.00 acres (202.34 ha)
Pohatcong Creek Wildlife Management Area	Warren County	129.54 acres (52.42 ha)
Point Pleasant Fishing Access Wildlife Management Area	Ocean County	6.60 acres (2.67 ha)
Pork Island Wildlife Management Area	Atlantic County	867.20 acres (350.94 ha)
Port Republic Wildlife Management Area	Atlantic County	1,470.91 acres (595.26 ha)
Prospertown Lake Wildlife Management Area	Ocean County	858.40 acres (347.38 ha)
Raccoon Creek Wildlife Management Area	Gloucester County	272.74 acres (110.37 ha)
Rainbow Lake Wildlife Management Area	Salem County	91.12 acres (36.87 ha)
Ratzman Access Wildlife Management Area	Warren County	7.42 acres (3.00 ha)
Rockaway River Wildlife Management Area	Morris County	3,667.16 acres (1,484.05 ha)
Rockport Wildlife Management Area	Warren County	1,274.40 acres (515.73 ha)
Rowands Pond Wildlife Management Area	Camden County	12.98 acres (5.25 ha)
Salem River Wildlife Management Area (Note: includes separate Mannington East, Mannington West, Salem, and Woodstown tracts)	Salem County	3,230.40 acres (1,307.30 ha)
Sawmill Creek Wildlife Management Area	Bergen and Hudson counties	727.00 acres (294.21 ha)
Sedge Islands Wildlife Management Area	Ocean County	192.33 acres (77.83 ha)
South Branch Wildlife Management Area (Note: includes separate Catanzaretti, Merck, North, Rockaway Creek, South tracts)	Hunterdon and Morris counties	1,946.51 acres (787.72 ha)
Sparta Mountain Wildlife Management Area	Sussex County	3,461.20 acres (1,400.70 ha)
Spicers Creek Access Wildlife Management Area	Cape May County	17.60 acres (7.12 ha)
Splitrock Reservoir Access Wildlife Management Area	Morris County	-
Stafford Forge Wildlife Management Area	Ocean County	11,925.93 acres (4,826.25 ha)
Swan Bay Wildlife Management Area	Burlington County	3,642.95 acres (1,474.25 ha)
Thundergut Pond Wildlife Management Area	Salem County	2,426.51 acres (981.97 ha)
Trout Brook Wildlife Management Area	Sussex County	1,843.60 acres (746.08 ha)
Tuckahoe (MacNamara) Wildlife Management Area	Cape May and Atlantic counties	17,370.73 acres (7,029.69 ha)
Turkey Swamp Wildlife Management Area	Monmouth County	3,932.00 acres (1,591.22 ha)
Union Lake Wildlife Management Area	Cumberland and Salem counties	5,129.21 acres (2,075.72 ha)
Upper Barnegat Bay Wildlife Management Area	Ocean County	357.04 acres (144.49 ha)
Van Nest Refuge Wildlife Management Area	Mercer County	98.00 acres (39.66 ha)
Wading River Wildlife Management Area	Burlington County	159.26 acres (64.45 ha)
Walpack Wildlife Management Area	Sussex	387.54 acres (156.83 ha)
Wanaque Wildlife Management Area (Note: Property no longer a Wildlife Management Area, transferred to the Division of Parks and Forestry)	Passaic County	N/A
Weldon Brook Wildlife Management Area	Sussex County	1,555.11 acres (629.33 ha)
White Lake Wildlife Management Area	Warren County	984.45 acres (398.39 ha)
White Oak Branch Wildlife Management Area	Gloucester County	2,764.20 acres (1,118.63 ha)
Whiting Wildlife Management Area	Ocean County	1,206.62 acres (488.30 ha)
Whittingham Wildlife Management Area	Sussex County	1,930.15 acres (781.10 ha)
Wildcat Ridge Wildlife Management Area	Morris County	10,368.90 acres (4,196.14 ha)
Winslow Wildlife Management Area	Camden and Gloucester counties	8,381.89 acres (3,392.03 ha)

== See also ==
- New Jersey Division of Parks and Forestry
- List of New Jersey state parks
- National Wildlife Refuge
