= New Jersey Coastal Heritage Trail Route =

300-mile trail along the eastern and southern coast of New Jersey

Coordinates: 39.1343°N 74.7702°W

The New Jersey Coastal Heritage Trail Route extends along eastern and southern coast of New Jersey for nearly 300 miles (480 km). It travels along the Raritan Bay from Perth Amboy to Sandy Hook, along Jersey Shore at the Atlantic Ocean to Cape May, and along the Delaware Bay to the Delaware Memorial Bridge. The trail encompasses a variety of New Jersey state parks along with facilities under the jurisdiction of the National Park Service.

== Regions ==
=== Raritan Bayshore Sandy Hook Region ===
Middlesex County

- Cheesequake State Park
- Perth Amboy Harbor Walk

Monmouth County

- Allaire State Park
- Belford Seafood CO-OP
- Leonardo State Marina
- Mount Mitchell Scenic Overlook
- Twin Lights State Historic Site
- Sandy Hook, Gateway National Recreation Area
- Sea Bright–Monmouth Beach Seawall
- Steamboat Dock Museum

=== Barnegat Bay Region ===
Ocean County

- Barnegat Bay Decoy & Baymen's Museum
- Barnegat Lighthouse State Park
- Cattus Island Park
- Double Trouble State Park
- Eno's Pond County Park
- Forked River State Marina
- Great Bay Boulevard WMA
- Island Beach State Park
- Toms River Seaport Society Museum
- U.S. Coast Guard Station, Barnegat Light

=== Absecon Region ===
Atlantic County

- Edwin B. Forsythe National Wildlife Refuge
- Senator Frank S. Farley State Marina
- U.S. Coast Guard Station, Atlantic City

Cape May County

- Cape May Point State Park
- Corson's Inlet State Park
- Cape May Migratory Bird Refuge (The Nature Conservancy's William D. & Jane C. Blair Jr.)
- The Wetlands Institute
- Higbee Beach Wildlife Management Area
- Tuckahoe Wildlife Management Area
