= Bayville, New Jersey =

Place in Ocean County, New Jersey, United States

- Unincorporated community
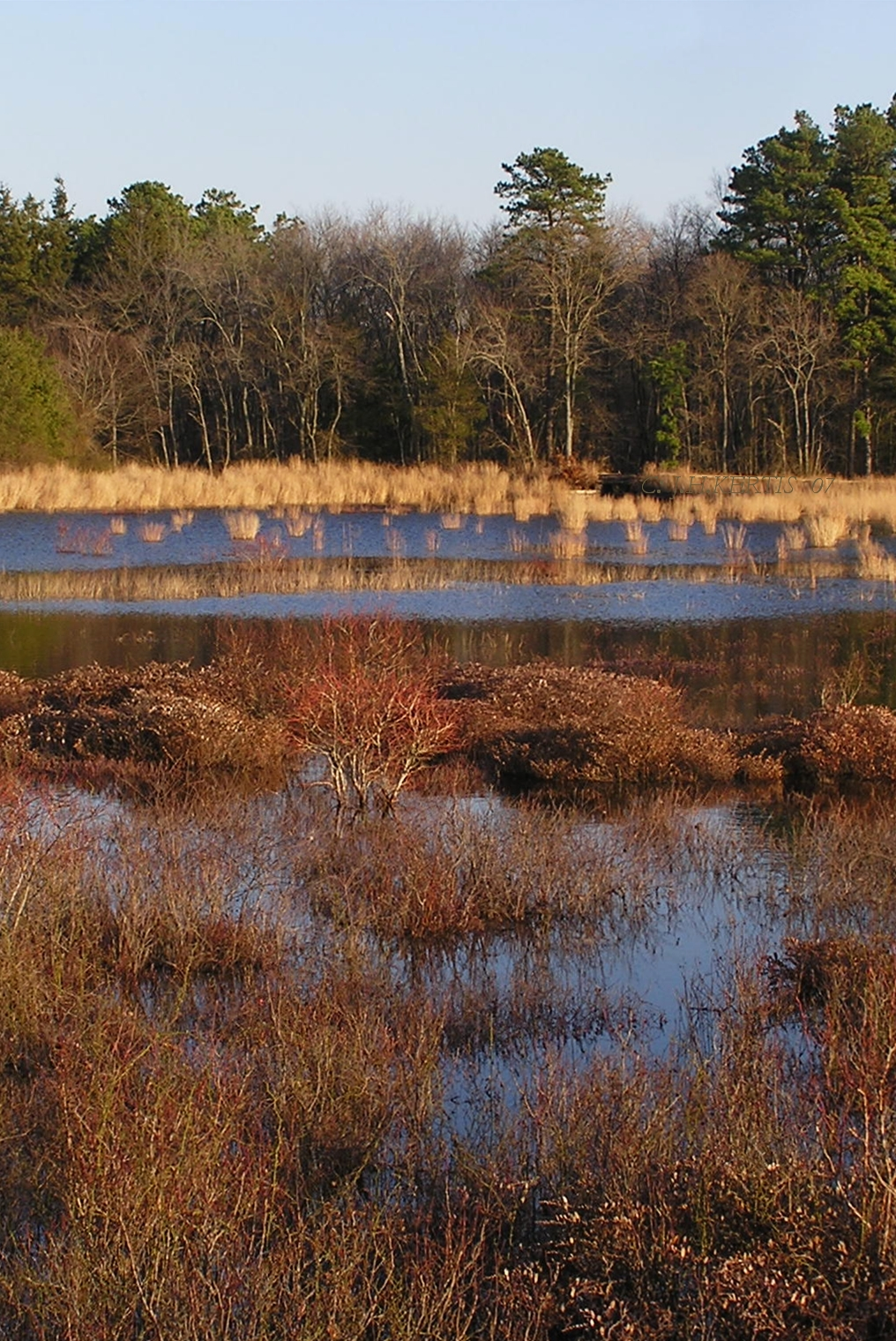
- Double Trouble State Park

- Bayville's location in Ocean County (Inset: Ocean County in New Jersey) Bayville, New Jersey (New Jersey) Bayville, New Jersey (the United States)
- Coordinates: 39°54′33″N 74°09′18″W
- Country: United States
- State: New Jersey
- County: Ocean
- Township: Berkeley
- Elevation: 36 ft (11 m)

Population (2010 Census)
  - Total: 20,512
- ZIP code: 08721
- GNIS feature ID: 0874560

Bayville is an unincorporated community located within Berkeley Township in Ocean County, New Jersey, United States. The area is served as United States Postal Service ZIP Code 08721. As of the 2010 United States census, the population for ZIP Code Tabulation Area (ZCTA) 08721 was 20,512. Central Regional High School is the local high school for the area.

Bayville is home to the majority of Double Trouble State Park, where Ocean Spray manages a cranberry bog. The area is said to be haunted by the mythical Jersey Devil and Glenn "The Maniac" Strange.

Bayville received 21 inches (530 mm) of snow in the January 2022 North American blizzard, the most of any place in the state.

WOBM-FM radio started broadcasting from Bayville in March 1968. The station relocated to studios in Toms River in 2013.

== Notable people ==
People who were born in, residents of, or otherwise closely associated with Bayville include:

- Tom DeBlass (born 1982), Brazilian jiu-jitsu practitioner, submission grappler and mixed martial artist
- Jazmyn Foberg (born 2000), artistic gymnast who was the 2014 US Junior National All-Around and Uneven Bars Champion.
- Al Leiter (born 1965), baseball pitcher.
- Phil Longo (born 1968), American football coach who is offensive coordinator and quarterbacks coach for the North Carolina Tar Heels football team.
- Megan McCafferty (born 1973), author best known for her Jessica Darling series.
