= Barnegat Light Public School =

- U.S. National Register of Historic Places
- New Jersey Register of Historic Places
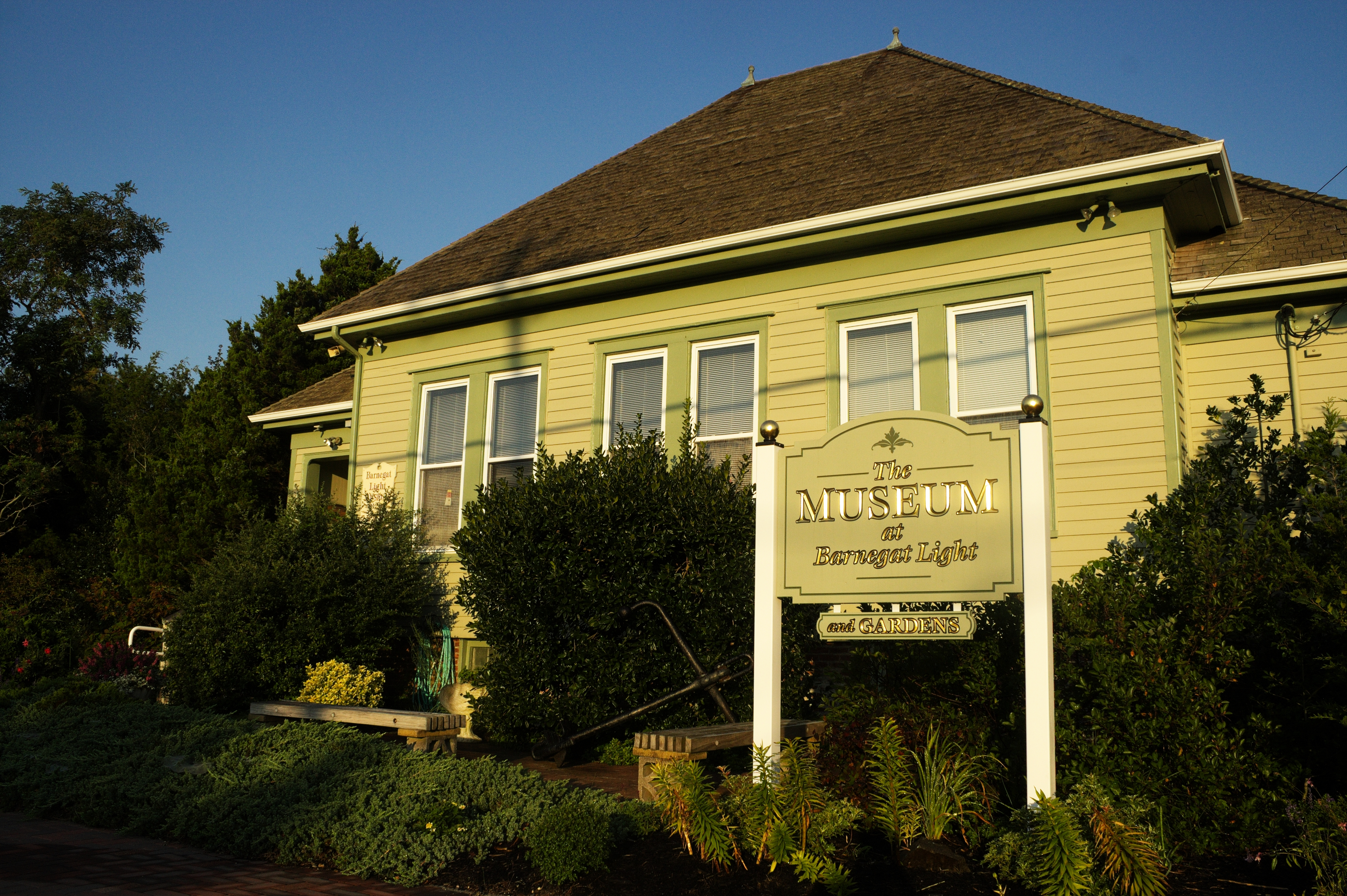

- Location within Ocean County, New Jersey Location within New Jersey Location within the United States
- Location: 501 Central Avenue, Barnegat Light, New Jersey
- Coordinates: 39°45′35.9″N 74°6′18.9″W
- Built: 1904
- NRHP reference No.: 76001178
- NJRHP No.: 2270

Significant dates
- Added to NRHP: June 7, 1976
- Designated NJRHP: December 8, 1975

The Barnegat Light Public School was the one-room schoolhouse for the borough of Barnegat Light in Ocean County, New Jersey, United States, from 1903 until June 15, 1951. It became the Barnegat Light Historical Society Museum in 1954. The schoolhouse was added to the National Register of Historic Places on June 7, 1976, for its significance in education.

== History and description ==
The one-room schoolhouse was completed in 1904. It was used as a schoolhouse until 1951, replaced by the Long Beach Island Consolidated School. The building was dedicated as the Barnegat Light Museum in 1954. Among other things, the museum houses the first degree Fresnel lens from Barnegat Lighthouse.

== See also ==
- National Register of Historic Places listings in Ocean County, New Jersey
- List of museums in New Jersey
