= Rancocas State Park =

State park in Burlington County, New Jersey

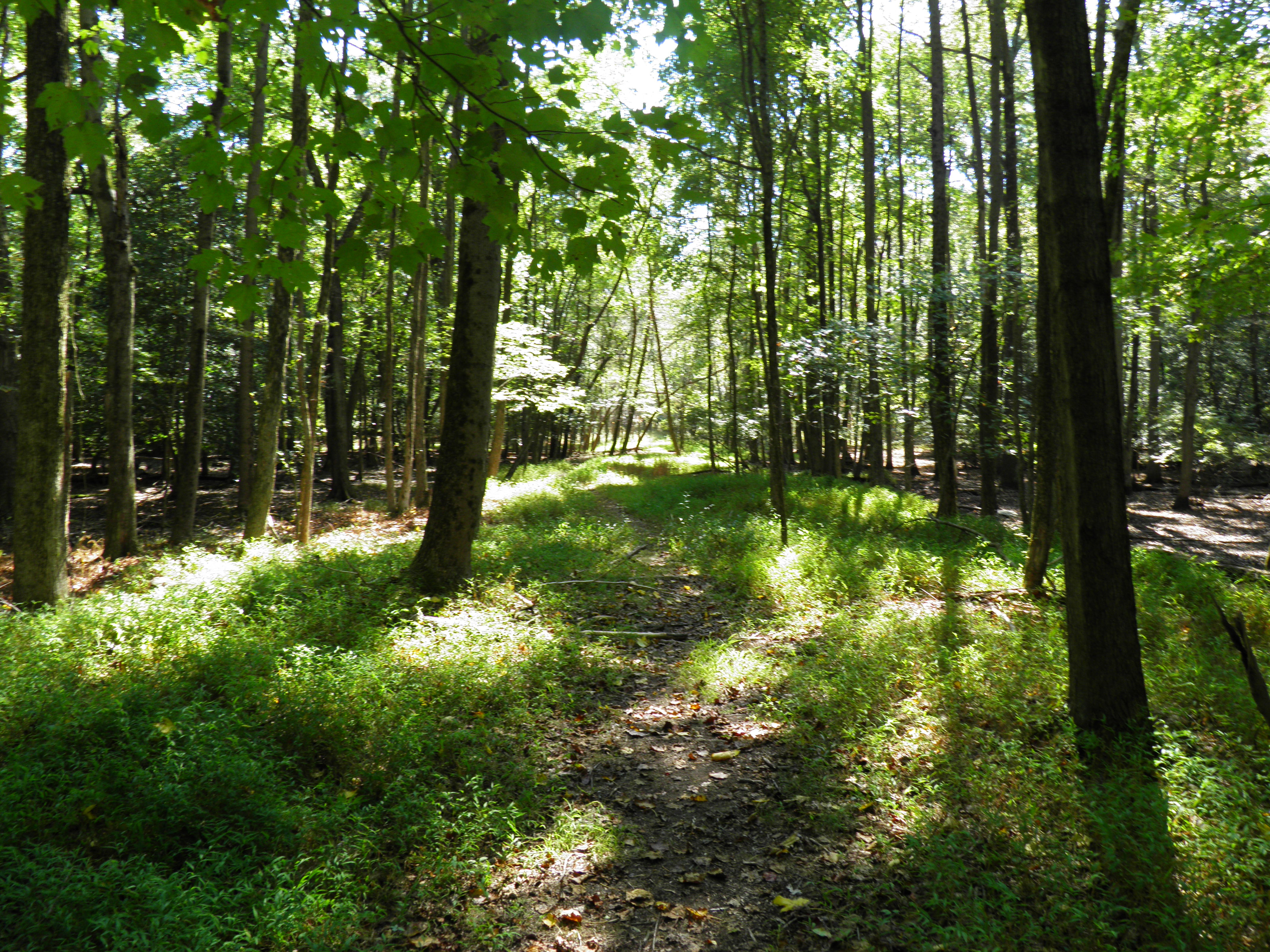
- Rancocas State Park in September 2010

- Location within New Jersey Location within the United States
- Location: Mount Laurel, Hainesport and Westampton, Burlington County, New Jersey
- Coordinates: 40°00′27″N 74°50′00″W
- Area: 1,252 acres (5.07 km^{2})
- Opened: 1965
- Operator: New Jersey Division of Parks and Forestry
- Website: Official website

Rancocas State Park is a 1,252 acres (5.07 km^{2}) protected area designated as a state park with sections located within Mount Laurel, Hainesport and Westampton townships in Burlington County, New Jersey, United States. Established in 1965, it is overseen and operated by the New Jersey Division of Parks and Forestry. The park is located near the confluence of the South and North branches of the Rancocas Creek and an extensive freshwater tidal marsh.
