= New Jersey Division of Fish and Wildlife =

Government agency in New Jersey, United States

- Logo of NJDFW

Division overview
- Formed: March 8, 1892; 134 years ago (as Fish and Game Commission)
- Jurisdiction: Government of New Jersey
- Division executive: Dave Golden, Assistant Commissioner
- Parent department: New Jersey Department of Environmental Protection
- Website: https://dep.nj.gov/njfw/

The New Jersey Division of Fish and Wildlife is a government agency in the U.S. state of New Jersey overseen by the cabinet-level New Jersey Department of Environmental Protection (NJDEP). The division is "dedicated to the protection, management and wise use of New Jersey's fish and wildlife resources". The division issues licenses, stamps and permits for hunting, fishing and trapping and the proceeds from such sales directly fund the division's operations, specifically includes the operation of two fish hatcheries and associated stocking programs, a pheasant farm, enforcement of fish and wildlife regulations, habitat protection, fish and wildlife research, wildlife management area maintenance and improvement, education, and other programs and activities".

== Divisions ==
The Division, through its Bureau of Land Management, administers the state's 121 Wildlife Management Areas (WMA) totaling over 354,000 acres (1,430 km^{2}).

The division's duties are divided into several administrative bureaus, including:

- Bureau of Freshwater Fisheries
- Bureau of Land Management
- Bureau of Law Enforcement
- Bureau of Marine Fisheries
- Bureau of Shellfisheries
- Bureau of Wildlife Management
- Bureau of Information and Education
- Bureau of Fisheries Production
- Endangered and Nongame Species Program
- Office of Administration
- Office of Environmental Review
- Office of Fish and Wildlife Health and Forensics

== See also ==
- List of law enforcement agencies in New Jersey
- List of state and territorial fish and wildlife management agencies in the United States
