= Craig House (New Jersey) =

Historic house in New Jersey, United States

- U.S. Historic district – Contributing property
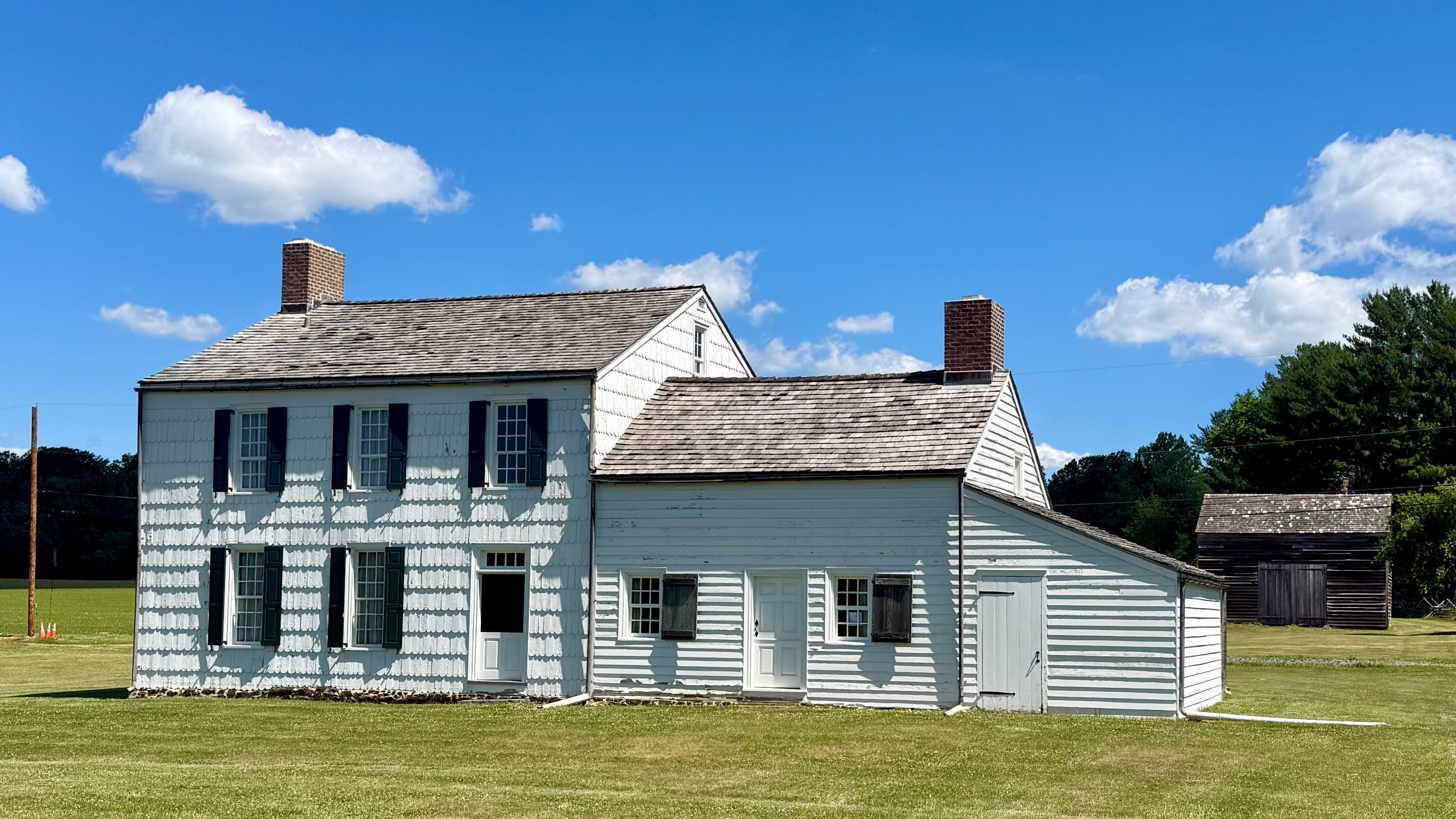
- Craig House on Monmouth Battlefield in 2026

- Location within Monmouth County, New Jersey Location within New Jersey Location within the United States
- Coordinates: 40°16′28.6″N 74°17′50.7″W
- Part of: Monmouth Battlefield Historic District (ID66000467)
- Designated CP: October 15, 1966

The Craig House is the name of a restored colonial era farmhouse in western Monmouth County, New Jersey, which was located on the site of the Battle of Monmouth during the Revolutionary War in June 1778. Utilized during the battle by the British Army as a hospital, it is one of many 18th century farmhouses that have been preserved at Monmouth Battlefield State Park. The Craig House is located in Freehold Township. Monmouth Battlefield is administered by the New Jersey State Park Service.

== History ==
=== Colonial history ===
In 1664, the Duke of York (later James II & VII) granted the Monmouth Tract to Sir George Carteret and various Scottish Presbyterian and English Quaker settlers, fleeing religious persecution at home. In 1693, along with Middletown and Shrewsbury, Freehold was established by act of legislature as one of the three original townships in Monmouth County.

Among the first Scottish settlers in modern-day western Monmouth County was John Craig Sr. (ca. 1650–1724) of Perth Amboy, New Jersey, who settled with his family in 1685. He acquired in 1695 a plot of land named by locals as "Topinemes".

John Sr.'s son Archibald Craig (1678-1751) bought the premises of what would be the Craig Farmstead in 1720. His son Samuel (1708–1746) inherited the farm in 1744 and set out to construct what would be the Craig House in 1746.

Samuel died later in 1746, with the ownership of the farm reverting to his father Archibald. When Archibald died in 1751, he bequeathed the estate to his grandson (and Samuel's son) John Jr. (1737-1824); however, he was not of adult age to claim his inheritance. The farm had to be rented out to tenants until John Jr. turned 21 in 1758.

Sometime around 1770, John Jr., now married to his wife Ann Craig (1739-1824) with a child, had added an addition to the house. He added a two-story Georgian style section adjacent to the older single-story Dutch style section of the house. This brought the house to its modern proportions and to what it would've looked like at the time of the Battle of Monmouth, roughly seven years later.

=== American Revolutionary War ===
During the Revolutionary War, John Craig was in the Continental Army. This left his wife Ann as the sole protector of their property during the battle. Once it became clear that the British were heading towards Monmouth, she escaped with her child, two slaves, and her household goods to Upper Freehold, New Jersey. Ann decided not to take her prized possessions of silver and gold, out of fears that it would weigh her down on that treacherous journey. She instead placed them underneath the open well. She hid her buckets and chain in the hay mow in the barn. These efforts ended up in no avail, as the British shortly after reaching the farmstead were able to find the mineral wealth at the bottom of the well. This was mainly due to the fact of how severely hot it was on the day of that fated battle, the soldiers' first priority would have been to get fresh water from the well. During that battle, the abandoned Craig House was quartered by the British and utilized as a hospital.

As the family returned after the battle, they were stunned to see that the house was still standing but also equally saddened that their hidden prized possessions had vanished. The iron kettle that the jewelry were placed in to hide under the well has been preserved.

British soldiers were buried at the Craig House's premises.

=== Later history ===
Panorama of the Craig House and the battlefield in 2026

With the house left intact, the family were able to continue farming for 50 years after the battle. John Craig, Jr. died in 1824, his inheritance was divided amongst his children, Jonathan (who received a half of the share) and his daughters Amelia and Mary (who both inherited one-quarter share each). When Mary died in 1839, Jonathan and his brother Samuel (who inherited property in New York) legally granted full ownership of the property to Amelia and her husband Peter Bowne. Amelia and Peter birthed a daughter, Anna Maria Bowne. Anna married Enoch L. Cowart, birthed a son named Samuel Craig Cowart in 1854, and inherited the property upon her mother's death in 1855.

Samuel Craig Cowart (1854-1943), was active in the community. Hailing from Freehold Borough, New Jersey, he was a prestigious lawyer. A charter member of the National Society of the Sons of the American Revolution, he had a deep passion for history. When his mother Anna Maria died in 1898, the property was bequeathed to his father Enoch, before being passed down to Samuel upon Enoch's death in 1908. While despite Samuel not residing in the Craig House (he would rent it out to tenant farmers) he was still very enamored with the homestead's rich history and the role it played during the Battle of Monmouth. The iron kettle that held the legendary jewelry of his ancestors was actually retrieved and restored by Samuel. After Samuel's death in 1943, his widowed wife sold the farm to Ernest Tark, who used what he renamed as 'Battleground Farm' to hire migrants to cultivate the agriculture. The farmland was maintained but the home itself deteriorated.

The State of New Jersey acquired the house in 1965. It is a contributing property of the Monmouth Battlefield Historic District, which was added to the National Register of Historic Places in 1966. The Craig House was restored to its Revolutionary War era appearance in 1993 (thanks in part to the advocacy of preserving historic structures at Monmouth Battlefield, by the Friends of Monmouth Battlefield). The home reopened that same year as a museum, and remains a notable fixture at Monmouth Battlefield. The museum is located near Schibanoff Park and Ride on U.S. Route 9.

Despite the restoration in 1993, the home has not been maintained that much since. There have been calls to restore the home again, especially with the 250th anniversary of American independence fast approaching. Historian and President of the Friends of Monmouth Battlefield society Dr. David G. Martin, has expressed concern for all of the structures on the Battlefield's premises, but is particularly concerned for the Craig House and thinks that should be the beneficiary of any grants from the state. For the time being, the home's rustic charm still invokes a calling to the area's colonial agrarian past.

== Facilities ==
- Craig House – Open on Sundays from 1-4PM (as of 2022)
- Barn – Closed to the public

== See also ==
- Battle of Monmouth
- Covenhoven House
- Oakley Farmhouse
- Old Tennent Church
- Village Inn
- Jockey Hollow
- List of the oldest buildings in New Jersey
