= Barnegat Inlet =

Inlet in New Jersey

Coordinates: 39°46′00″N 74°06′12″W

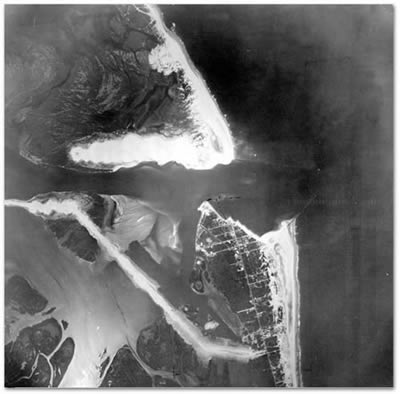
Aerial photo of the Barnegat Inlet in 1944

Barnegat Inlet is a small inlet connecting the Barnegat Bay with the Atlantic Ocean in Ocean County, New Jersey. It separates Island Beach State Park and the Barnegat Peninsula from Long Beach Island. The Barnegat Lighthouse sits at the northern end of Long Beach Island along the inlet.

The area surrounding the Barnegat Bay and Barnegat Inlet were described by Henry Hudson, in 1609, as "...a great lake of water, as we could judge it to be ... The mouth of the lake hath many shoals, and the sea breaketh on them as it is cast out of the mouth of it." The inlet was originally named in 1614 "Barendegat," or "Inlet of the Breakers," by Dutch explorers of the coastline, referring to the waterway's turbulent channel.

Historically the inlet has been important to commerce to the Barnegat Bay region, allowing ships to access centers of commerce like Toms River. More recently, shipwrecks have attracted scuba divers to the area. The inlet is also a popular destination for birdwatchers.

The continued threat of storms such as the Ash Wednesday Storm of 1962 reinforced concerns about the stability of the shoreline along the inlet. The construction of the existing jetty in the 1990s added a significant amount of land to the town of Barnegat Light, much of which was designated as parkland and now includes a bird sanctuary. The jetty has provided stabilization to the shoreline along the inlet, but requires frequent dredging.

== See also ==
- Barnegat Bay
- Barnegat Light, New Jersey
- Barnegat Lighthouse
- Barnegat Peninsula
- Long Beach Island
