= Double Trouble State Park, New Jersey =

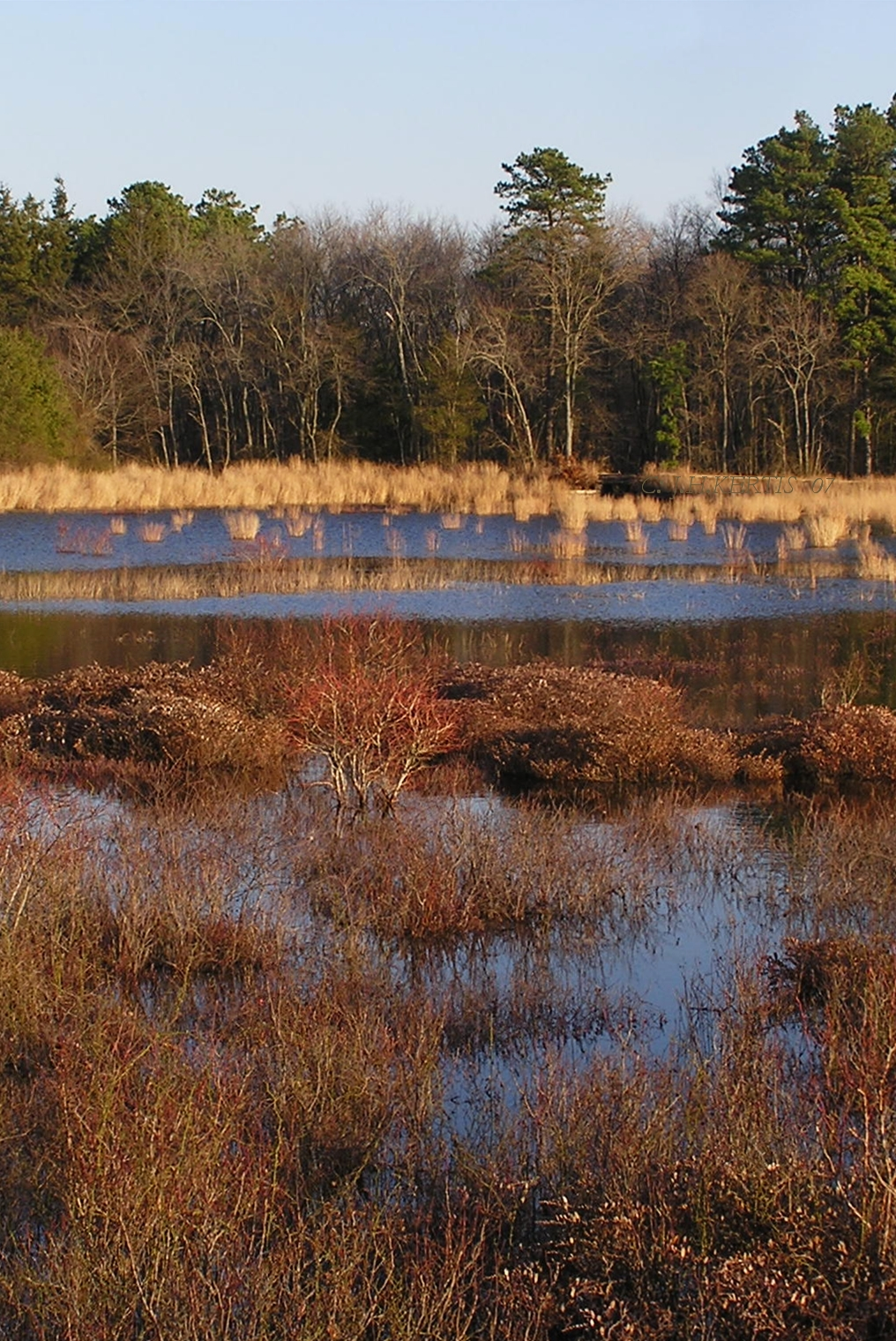
- Double Trouble cranberry bog

- Location within Ocean County, New Jersey Location within New Jersey Location within the United States
- Location: Ocean County, New Jersey
- Coordinates: 39°53′52″N 74°13′17″W
- Area: 8,495 acres (34.38 km^{2})
- Opened: 1964
- Operator: New Jersey Division of Parks and Forestry
- Website: Official website

Double Trouble State Park is located in Berkeley and Lacey Townships in Ocean County, in the U.S. state of New Jersey. The park was once the Double Trouble company's company town. The park's wilderness is part of the Pine Barrens ecosystem. The park is operated and maintained by the New Jersey Division of Parks and Forestry.

== Double Trouble Historic Village ==
The Double Trouble Historic Village was originally a cranberry farm and packing plant. The Double Trouble Company was formed by Edward Crabbe in 1909 to sell timber, millwork products, and cranberries. Many sawmills have been in the town since the mid-18th century. The village consists of cranberry bogs and fourteen restored historic structures dating from the late 19th century through the early 20th century including a general store, a schoolhouse and houses. The sawmill was restored in 1995, and the cranberry sorting and packing house were completed in 1996.

The town was named for the fact that muskrats breached a local dam twice in one week.

- Double Trouble Historic District
- U.S. National Register of Historic Places
- U.S. Historic district
- New Jersey Register of Historic Places
- Area: 200 acres (81 ha)
- NRHP reference No.: 78001787
- NJRHP No.: 2276

Significant dates
- Added to NRHP: February 23, 1978
- Designated NJRHP: October 14, 1977

== Double Trouble Historic District ==
The Double Trouble Historic District was added to the National Register of Historic Places on February 23, 1978 for its significance in agriculture and industry.

== Cedar Creek ==
Cedar Creek's headwaters start from the Greenwood Forest Management Area to its mouth at Barnegat Bay. Cedar Creek provides the water needed for cranberry culture and provides a source of water for wildlife.

== Trail ==
The Double Trouble State Park Nature Trail is a 1.5 miles (2.4 km) loop trail. (This trail is not rated by the New Jersey Department of Environmental Protection). The trail is part of the New Jersey Coastal Heritage Route.

== See also ==
- List of New Jersey state parks
