= Sparta Mountains =

Mountain range in Sussex County, New Jersey

- Location within New Jersey

Highest point
- Elevation: 1,230 ft (370 m) NGVD 29

Geography
- Country: United States
- State: New Jersey
- Counties: Sussex
- Range coordinates: 41°02.35′N 74°37.00′W
- Parent range: New York–New Jersey Highlands; New England province; Appalachian Highlands
- Borders on: Sparta Valley
- Topo map: USGS Franklin
- Biome: Eastern Temperate Forests (Level I); Northern Forests (Level II); Northeastern Highlands (Level III)

Geology
- Orogeny: Grenville orogeny
- Rock age: Stenian period of the Mesoproterozoic era
- Rock types: Crystalline metamorphic rock and gneiss

The Sparta Mountains are a range of the New York-New Jersey Highlands region of the Appalachian Mountains. The summit, reaching a height of 1,230 feet (375 metres), lies within Sussex County, New Jersey.

== Geography ==
The Sparta Mountains are bordered by the Sparta Valley to the north-west, drained by the Wallkill River.

== Geology ==
The Sparta Mountains are part of the Reading Prong of the New England Upland subprovince of the New England province of the Appalachian Highlands. The rocks that form the Sparta Mountains are from the same belt as those that make up other mountains near-by. This belt, i.e. the Reading Prong, consists of ancient crystalline metamorphic rocks. The New England province as a whole, along with the Blue Ridge province further south, are often together referred to as the Crystalline Appalachians. The Crystalline Appalachians extend as far north as the Green Mountains of Vermont and as far south as the Blue Ridge Mountains, although a portion of the belt remains below the Earth's surface through part of Pennsylvania. The Crystalline Appalachians are distinct from the parallel Sedimentary Appalachians which run from Georgia to New York. The Kittatinny Mountains are representative of these sedimentary formations.
