= Barnegat Lighthouse =

Lighthouse in New Jersey, United States

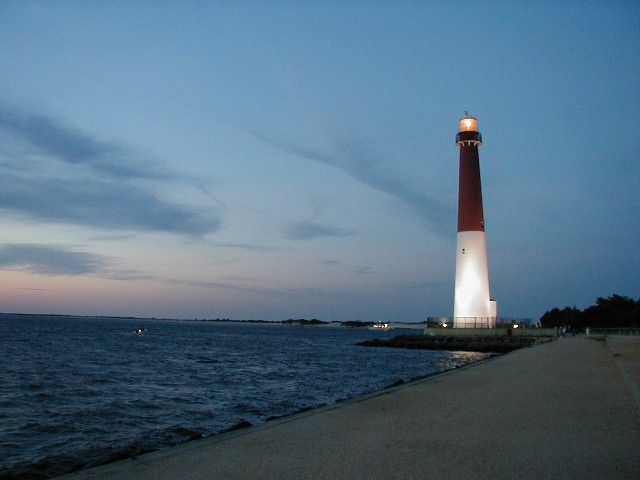
- Barnegat Lighthouse, bordering the Atlantic Ocean
- Location: North end of Long Beach Island, off Broadway Avenue, Barnegat Light, New Jersey
- Coordinates: 39°45′52″N 74°06′22″W

Tower
- Constructed: 1835
- Foundation: Granite crib
- Construction: Brick / iron
- Automated: 1927
- Height: 169 ft (52 m)
- Shape: Conical
- Markings: White bottom half Red top half White lantern
- Heritage: National Register of Historic Places listed place

Light
- First lit: 1857 (current tower)
- Deactivated: 1944–2009
- Focal height: 163 ft (50 m)
- Lens: 4th order Fresnel lens (original), 1st order Fresnel lens (1857), VRB-25 (current)
- Range: 22 nmi (41 km; 25 mi)
- Characteristic: Flashing white, 10s
- Barnegat Lighthouse
- U.S. National Register of Historic Places
- Area: less than one acre
- NRHP reference No.: 71000512
- Added to NRHP: January 25, 1971

Barnegat Lighthouse (or Barnegat Light, locally nicknamed Old Barney) is a historic lighthouse located in Barnegat Lighthouse State Park on the northern tip of Long Beach Island, in the borough of Barnegat Light, Ocean County, New Jersey, United States, on the south side of Barnegat Inlet.

== History ==
=== 19th century ===
The development of the original lighthouse began in June 1834 with the appropriation of $6,000 from Congress. The 40-foot-tall (12 m) lighthouse was commissioned the next year, though mariners at the time considered the building's non-flashing, fifth-class light to be inadequate. Because of the strong currents in the inlet, the lighthouse was built 900 feet (270 m) away from the water; but within ten years only 450 feet (140 m) separated the tower from the water.

In 1855, Lt. George G. Meade, an Army engineer and later Union general who defeated Robert E. Lee at the Battle of Gettysburg in the American Civil War, was assigned to design a new lighthouse. He was chosen largely because of his recent design of Absecon Light. Meade completed the construction plans in 1855 and work began in late 1856. Because of continuing erosion during its construction, the new lighthouse was located about 100 feet (30 m) south of the original structure, the site of which is now submerged. During construction, in June 1857, the light in the original structure was relocated to a temporary wooden tower located nearby. This was prompted by the encroaching seas which threatened the original lighthouse and ultimately caused the tower to collapse into the water later that year. Because of the rough waters of the area, several jetties have been built throughout the history of both lighthouses.

Barnegat Light was commissioned on January 1, 1859. The tower light was 172 feet (52 m) above sea level and the lighthouse itself was 163 feet (50 m) tall, four times taller than the original. The new light was a first-order flashing Fresnel lens, which stood about 12 feet (3.7 m) tall. The total cost of the project was about $40,000, with the lens alone costing $15,000. The current lighthouse is really two towers in one: the exterior conical tower covers a cylindrical tower on the inside.

=== 20th–21st centuries ===
The lighthouse's beacon remained a first-class navigational light until August 1927 when the Barnegat Lightship was anchored 8 nautical miles (15 km; 9.2 mi) off the coast. This prompted the automation and replacement of the first-order lens with a gas blinker. As a result, the tower's light was reduced by over 80 percent. The gas blinker was replaced several weeks later with a 250-watt electric bulb, though the gas apparatus can still be seen at the top of the tower.

The light was deactivated as a Coast Guard lookout tower in January 1944 and given to the State of New Jersey. Four years later, the local municipality, Barnegat City, renamed itself Barnegat Light. In 1954, the lens was returned to the borough of Barnegat Light and is now on exhibit in the Barnegat Light Museum. The area around the lighthouse was declared a state park and dedicated in 1957. The lightship was removed in 1969.

The structure was added to the National Register of Historic Places in 1971.

In 1988, the tower was closed for construction of the new south jetty, then reopened to visitors in 1991 with a new walkway on top of the jetty. The top of the lighthouse is accessible via its 217 steps and continues to attract in excess of half a million visitors year round.

In 2008, the Friends of Barnegat Lighthouse State Park, a local non-profit organization, raised funds to reactivate the lighthouse. A sum of $35,000 was raised, with $15,000 contributed by the Barnegat Light Borough Fraternal Order of Police Local Lodge No. 5. This supported the acquisition of a new $15,000 VRB-25 light system, as well as the replacement of ageing windows. Funding was raised entirely at the local level.

In October 2008, the VRB-25 system was installed. While physically smaller than the original light, the system has become a standard for US Lighthouses, with more than 100 installed.

On January 1, 2009, at 5:00 pm, the 150th anniversary of its opening, Barnegat Lighthouse activated its beacon for the first time since before World War II .

The lighthouse closed in March of 2022 for a seven-month renovation, though the museum and grounds remained open to the public.

The light now operates daily from dusk until dawn. There is a foghorn on Barnegat South Breakwater Light 7, at the ocean end of the south breakwater, which guards the inlet. The tower is flood-lit at night.

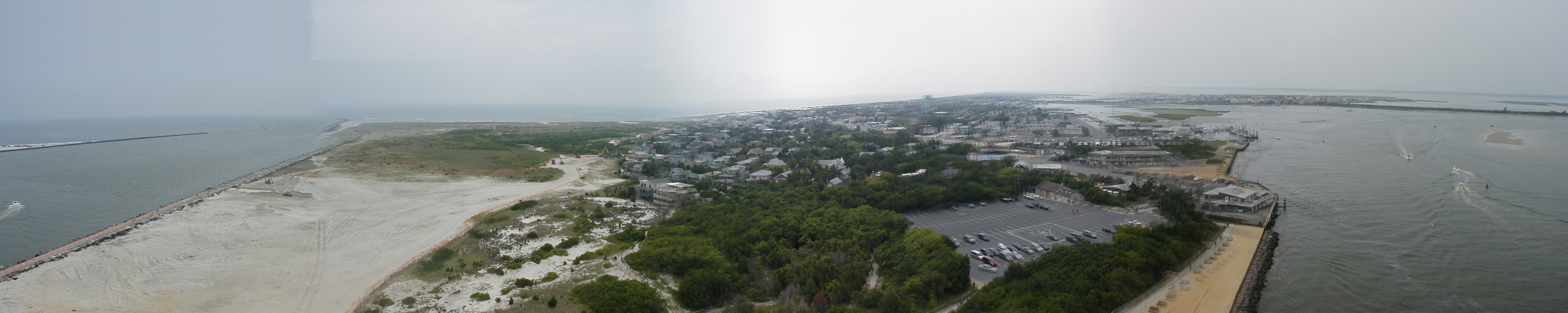
Looking south from the lighthouse

== Museums ==
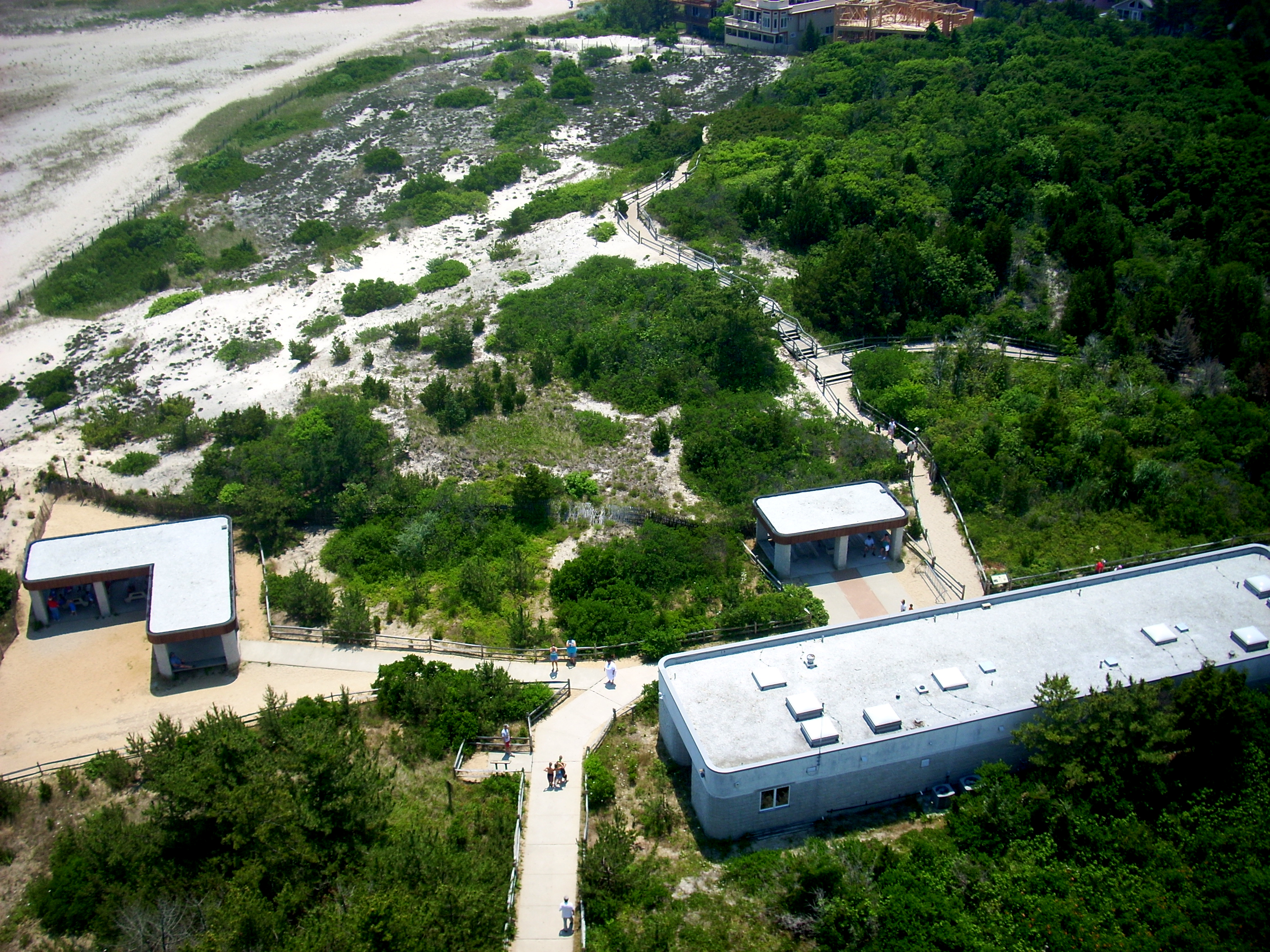
The Barnegat Light Interpretive Center, as seen from above

Adjacent to the lighthouse is the state's Barnegat Lighthouse Interpretive Center, open seasonally and staffed by volunteers from the nonprofit group Friends of Barnegat Lighthouse State Park. The center shows the history of Barnegat Lighthouse from shipwreck to first-class seacoast light. Exhibits focus on the history of the lighthouse, lighthouse technology, the duties of Barnegat Lighthouse's keepers, and efforts to protect Barnegat Lighthouse.

Several blocks away is the Barnegat Light Museum, operated by the Barnegat Light Historical Society. It houses the light's original first-order Fresnel lens, as well as related exhibits including images of Sinbad, the WWII Coast Guard dog who was enlisted in the service, retired to Barnegat, and is buried at the base of the old Coast Guard station flagpole.

== Popular culture ==
Barnegat Lighthouse is the subject of Keeper of the Tower, a suspense fiction novel by Barnegat resident Brett Scott Ermilio. The novel takes place circa 1919.

The lighthouse is depicted on New Jersey's "Shore Conservation" license plates and on the 1996–1997 Federal Duck Stamp.

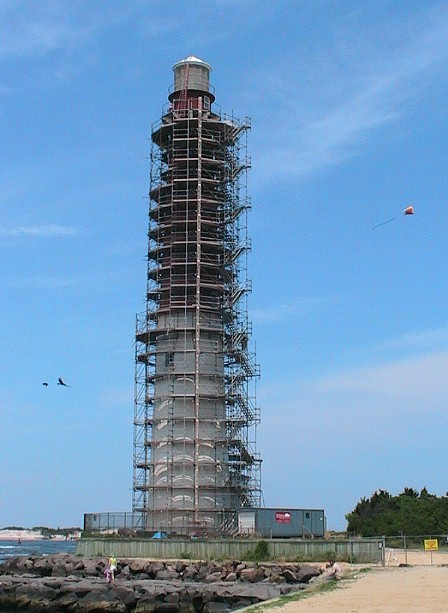
Restoration work in 2003

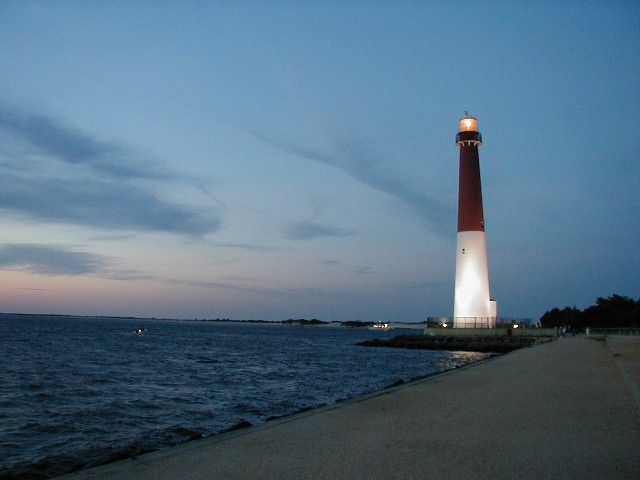
Alongside the Barnegat Inlet

From the northernmost tip of Long Beach Island

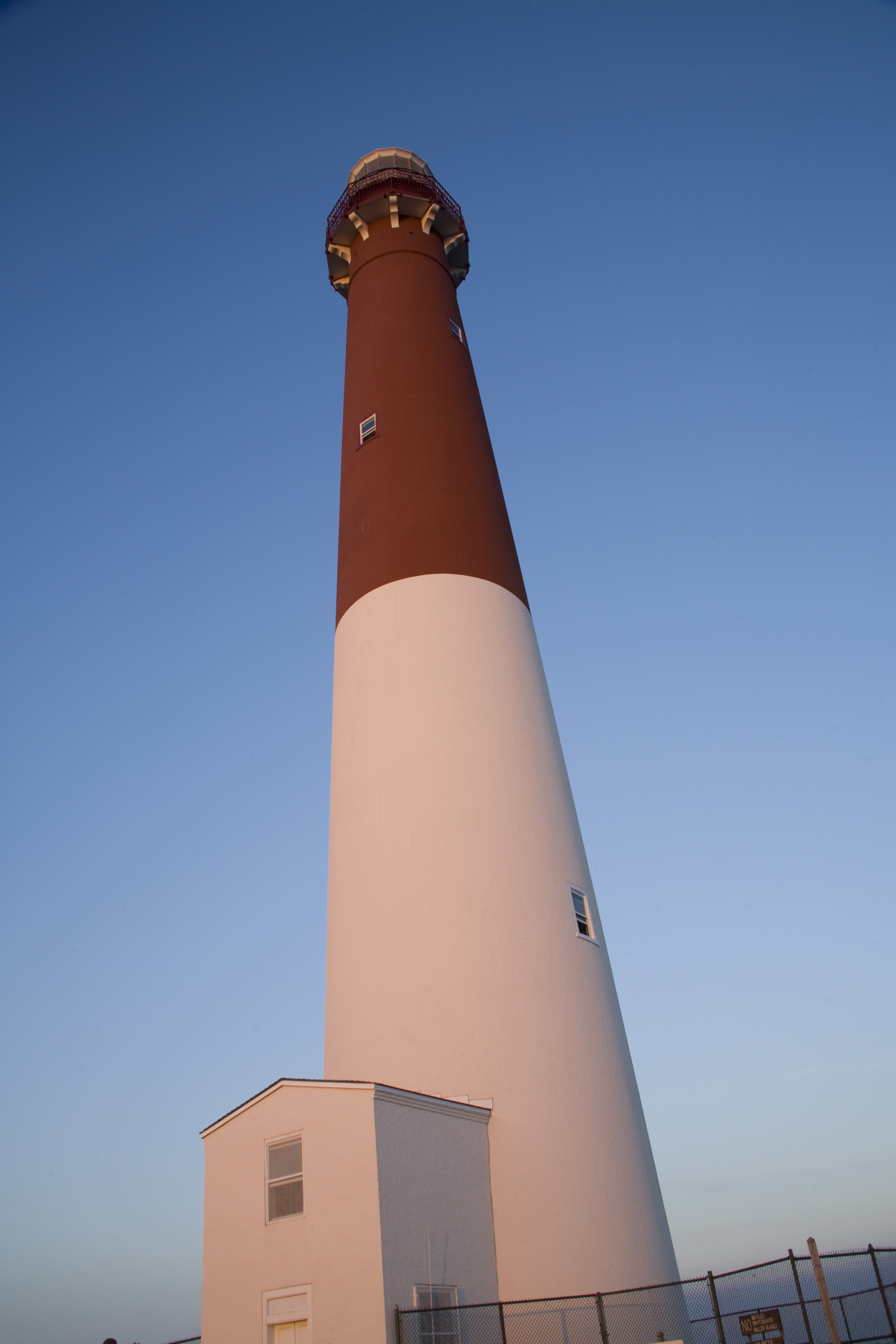
Barnegat Light at sunrise

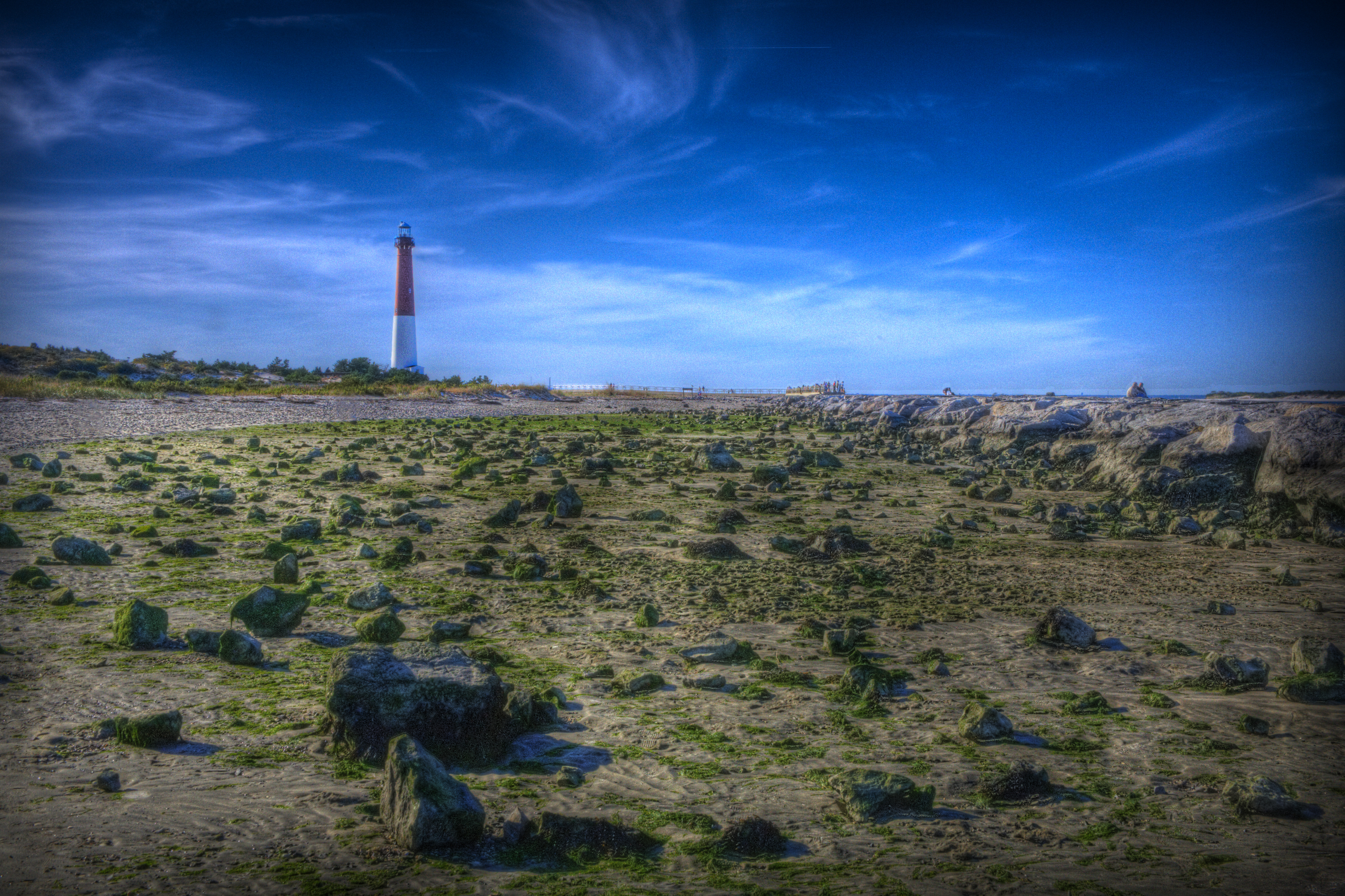
HDR image of Barnegate Light looking west.

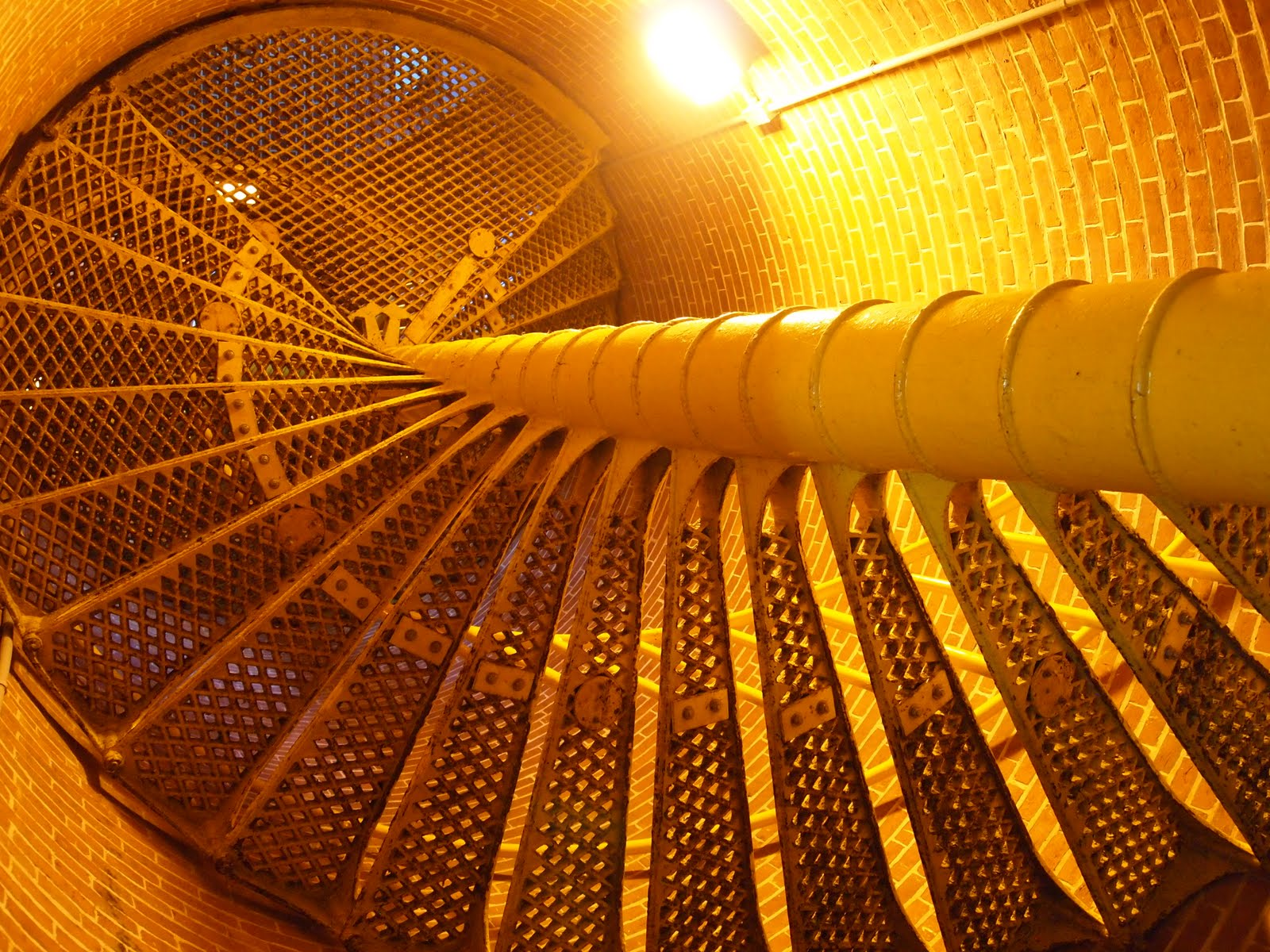
Interior view of the first and second level of the staircase.

== See also ==
- National Register of Historic Places listings in Ocean County, New Jersey
- List of museums in New Jersey
