= New Jersey Division of Parks and Forestry =

State agency of New Jersey, US

State of New Jersey Division of Parks and Forestry

Agency overview
- Jurisdiction: New Jersey
- Parent agency: New Jersey Department of Environmental Protection
- Child agencies: New Jersey Forest Service; New Jersey Forest Fire Service; New Jersey Office of Natural Lands Management; New Jersey State Park Police; New Jersey State Park Service
- Website: http://www.state.nj.us/dep/parksandforests/

In the state of New Jersey, the New Jersey Division of Parks and Forestry is an administrative division of the New Jersey Department of Environmental Protection. In its most visible role, the division is directly responsible for the management and operation of New Jersey's public park system which includes 42 state parks, 11 state forests, 3 recreation areas, and more than 50 historic sites and districts. However, its duties also include protecting state and private lands from wildfire, managing forests, educating the public about environmental stewardship and natural resources, as well as growing trees to maintain and restore forests in rural and urban areas, and to preserve the diversity of the trees within the forests.

The cultural and natural heritage of New Jersey is reflected in the diversity of its public parks, forests, and historic sites. The division is the steward of the historic homes, landscapes and battlefields where George Washington and the Continental Army spent almost half of the American Revolutionary War.

== History ==
- 1905: Forest Park Reservation Commission founded by Governor Edward C. Stokes.
- 1915: (April 8) Department and Board of Conservation and Development created, Forest Park Reservation Commission and other agencies merged into it.
- 1923: State Park Service formed.
- 1945: Department and Board of Conservation and Development became Division of Forestry, Geology, Parks and Historic Sites, Department of Conservation.; consisted of Division of Forests and Parks, of which the State Forester was chief, and the Division of Geology and Topography, in charge of the State Geologists. The department also administered the State Museum, the abandoned Morris Canal, and the Delaware and Raritan Canal.
- Historic Sites dropped from name in 1947, division absorbed into Division of Planning and Development, Department of Conservation and Economic Development.
- 1961, Name changed to the Division of Resource Development.
- 1961: Restored Division of Parks, Forestry and Recreation in Department of Conservation and Economic Development. Bureau of Forestry managed the State forests, growing trees for reforestation projects and stationing fire wardens throughout the State. The Bureau of Parks and Recreation maintained and operated the State Forests, Parks, and Historic Sites; Office of Natural Lands Management created.
- 1966: (May 27) Division of Parks, Forestry and Recreation was re-established in the Department of Conservation and Economic Development and authorized to develop, improve, protect, manage and administer all State forests, parks, recreation areas, historic sites, and natural areas.
- 1967: New Jersey Historic Trust established.
- 1967: (June 21) Historic Sites Council was established within the Division of Parks, Forestry and Recreation.
- 1968: New Jersey Natural Lands Trust established.
- 1970: New Jersey Department of Environmental Protection created (April 22) by Governor Cahill
- 1971: The Division of Parks, Forestry and Recreation joined the new Department of Environmental Protection and was designated the Division of Parks and Forestry in 1971.

== Agencies ==
=== New Jersey State Park Service ===
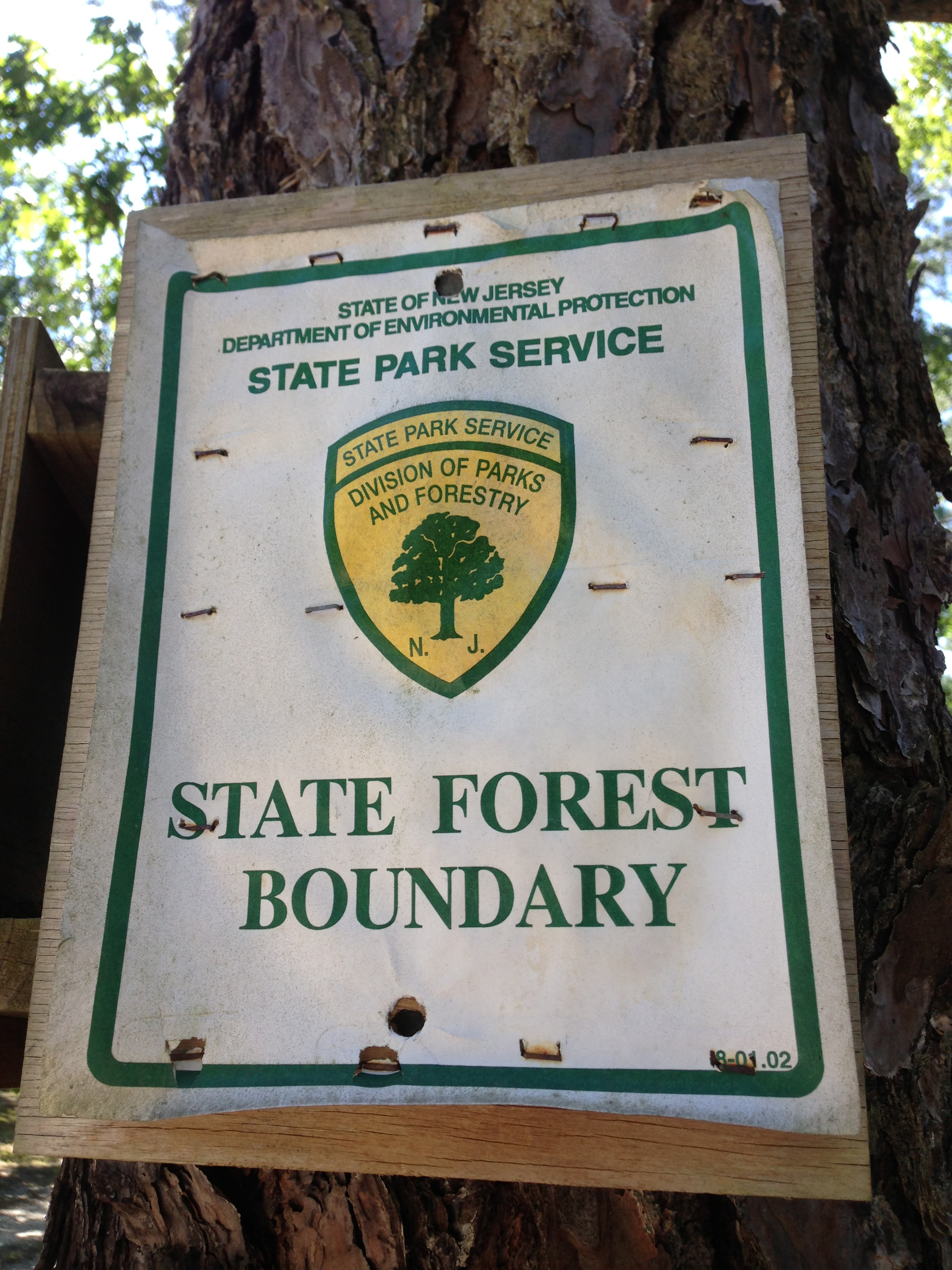

The State Park Service was organized in 1923 to manage three state parks, including with "four new employees in supervisory capacity and five others as helpers in subordinate positions" and between two and six additional laborers were used for special seasonal work from time to time. Today, the agency manages over 40 protected areas designated as state parks, state forests, recreation areas, marinas, and historic sites.

=== New Jersey Forest Fire Service ===
Founded in 1906 with a focus on wildland fire suppression and fire protection, the New Jersey Forest Fire Service is the largest firefighting department within the state of New Jersey in the United States with 85 full-time professional civil service positions, and approximately 2,000 trained part-time on-call wildland firefighters throughout the state. Its mission is to protect "life and property, as well as the state's natural resources, from wildfire." The New Jersey Forest Fire Service covers a primary response area of 3.72 million acres comprising 77% of the state's land area and administered by three regional divisions. This primary response area includes the state's rural and suburban areas, as well as its public state parks and forests. In 2014, the New Jersey Forest Fire Service responded to 1,063 wildfire events that destroyed 6,692 acres. The service conducted controlled burns or prescribed burns on 15,326 acres statewide.

== See also ==
- List of New Jersey Forest Fire Service fire towers
