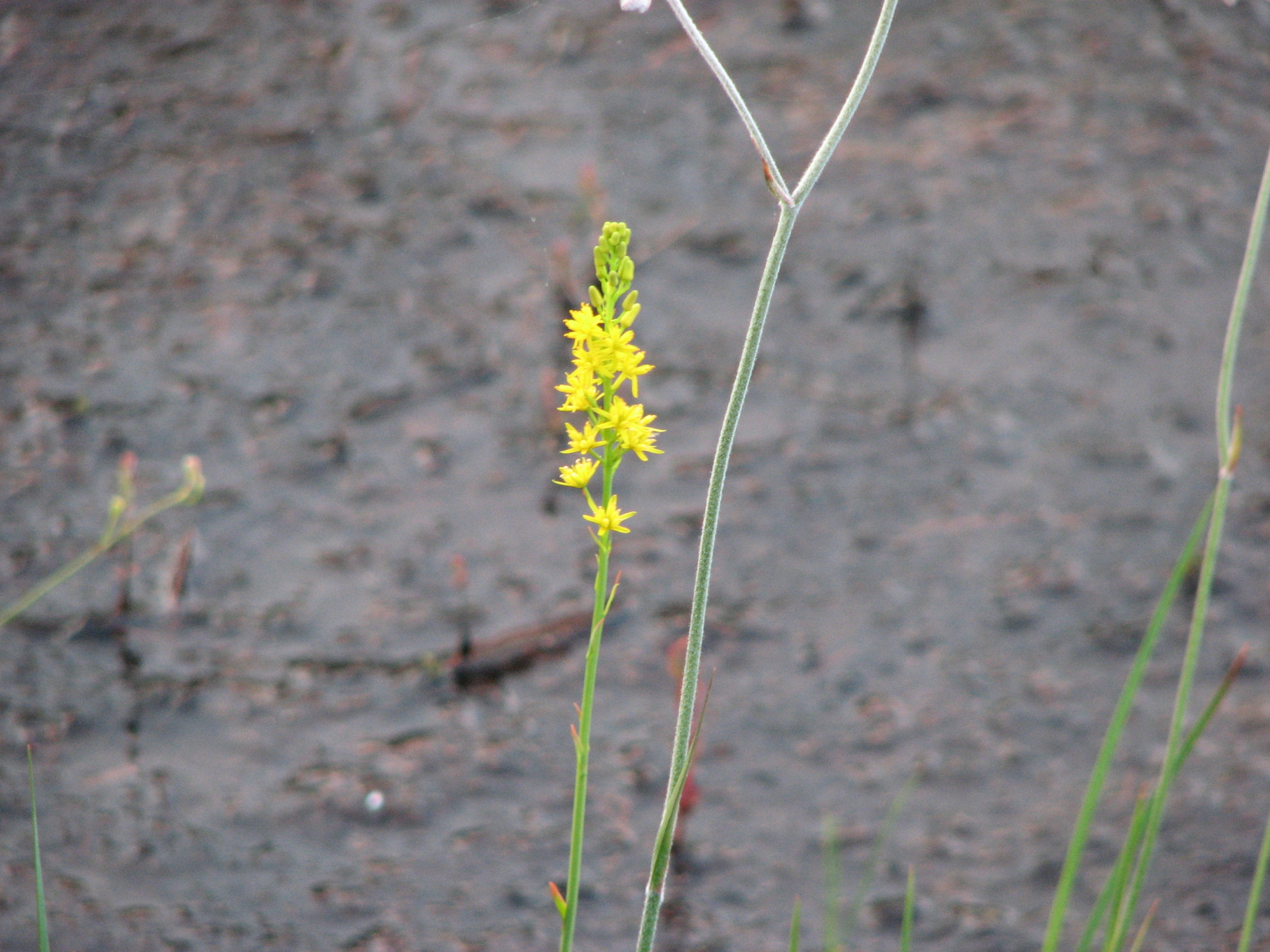

Conservation status
- Imperiled (NatureServe)

Scientific classification
- Kingdom: Plantae
- Clade: Tracheophytes
- Clade: Angiosperms
- Clade: Monocots
- Order: Dioscoreales
- Family: Nartheciaceae
- Genus: Narthecium
- Species: N. americanum

Binomial name
- Narthecium americanum Ker Gawl.

Synonyms
- Abama americana (Ker Gawl.) Morong; Abama montana Small; Narthecium ossifragum var. americanum (Ker Gawl.) A.Gray; Narthecium montanum (Small) Grey

= Narthecium americanum =

Species of flowering plant

Narthecium americanum is a species of flowering plant in the Nartheciaceae known by the common names yellow asphodel and bog asphodel. It is native to New Jersey in the United States. It is now apparently limited to that state, having likely been extirpated from Delaware, North Carolina, and South Carolina.

This rhizomatous perennial herb produces an erect stem 25 to 45 centimeters tall. It has narrow linear leaves up to 20 centimeters long by just a few millimeters wide around the base of the stem. Smaller leaves occur higher on the stem. The inflorescence is a dense raceme of yellow flowers that bloom in June and July. The fruit is a papery, beaked capsule a centimeter long or slightly longer. It contains yellow seeds.

This plant lives in the Pine Barrens of New Jersey, where it grows along three tributaries of the Mullica River, including the Wading and Batsto Rivers. It grows in bogs, wet savannas, swamps, and other wet habitat types. It may experience flooding, but it does not persist in standing water. It is more abundant in openings in the canopy than in shaded areas. Associated plant species include Oclemena nemoralis, Calamagrostis pickeringii, Calamovilfa brevipilis, Juncus caesariensis, Lophiola americana, Muhlenbergia torreyana, Platanthera integra, Pogonia ophioglossoides, Rhynchospora oligantha, Schizaea pusilla, and Tofieldia racemosa. Sphagnum mosses are also common in the habitat. This is the "asphodel, that greeny flower" of East Rutherford, New Jersey poet William Carlos Williams.

Degradation of the habitat is now the most important threat to the species. Habitat was lost when it was converted to agricultural uses, such as cranberry bogs, but direct habitat loss is not a major threat now. Most of the populations are now protected in the Pine Barrens. However, habitat degradation does occur via alteration of the local hydrology and the process of succession. Any lowering of the water table in the Pine Barrens is likely to impact the ecosystem, which requires a water table near the surface. Fire suppression is a likely cause of succession, characterized by the overgrowth of large and woody vegetation. This increases shade in the habitat, which negatively affects this and many other species in the herb layer. Other threats include off-road vehicles and picking and collecting of plants. Beaver dams may cause flooding of patches of habitat, which kills the plant.
