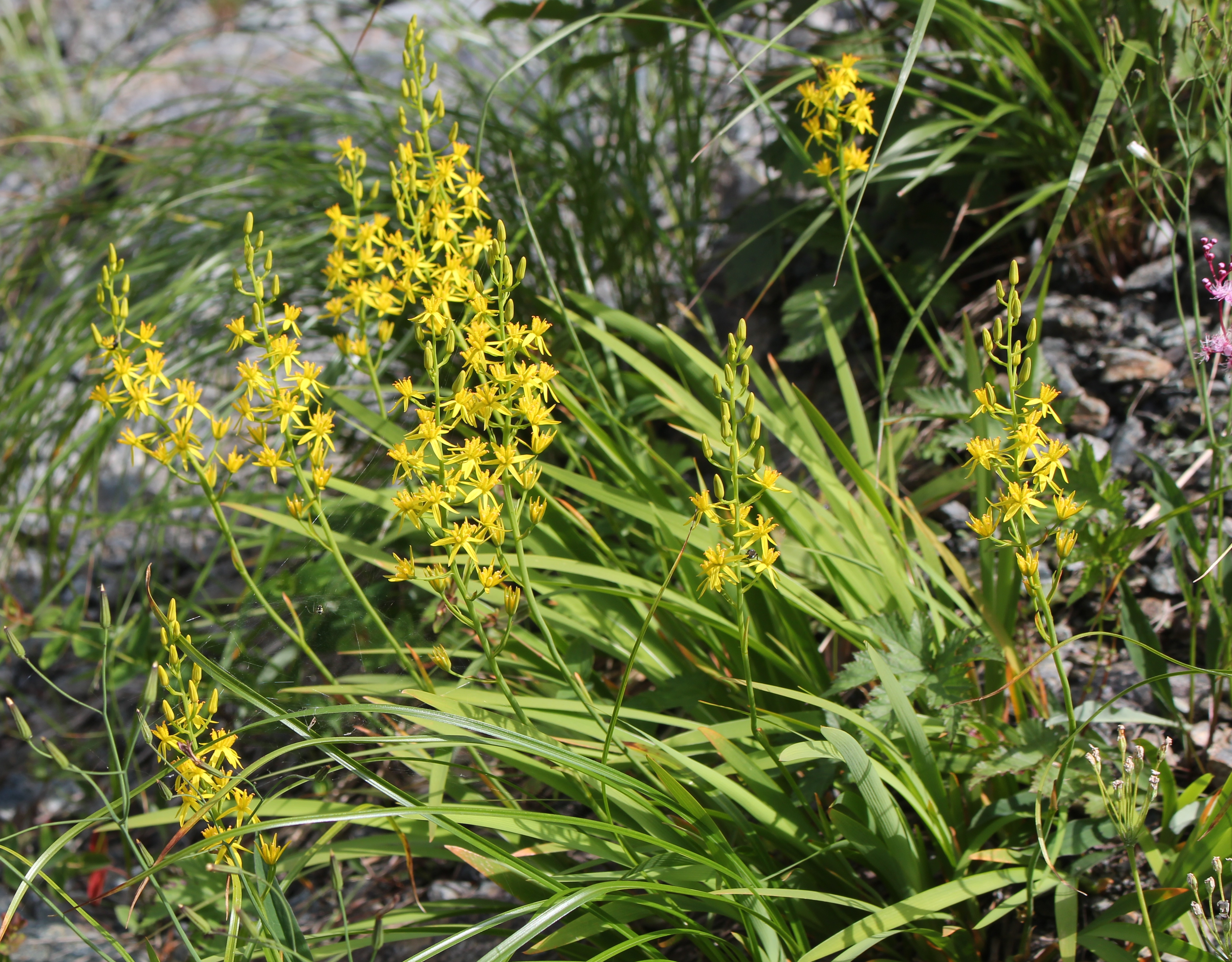

Scientific classification
- Kingdom: Plantae
- Clade: Tracheophytes
- Clade: Angiosperms
- Clade: Monocots
- Order: Dioscoreales
- Family: Nartheciaceae
- Genus: Narthecium
- Species: N. asiaticum

Binomial name
- Narthecium asiaticum Maxim.

Synonyms
- Abama asiatica (Maxim.) Makino

= Narthecium asiaticum =

Species of flowering plant

Narthecium asiaticum is a species of flowering plant in the family Nartheciaceae. It is endemic to Japan.
