= Aletris obovata =

Conservation status
- Apparently Secure (NatureServe)

Scientific classification
- Kingdom: Plantae
- Clade: Tracheophytes
- Clade: Angiosperms
- Clade: Monocots
- Order: Dioscoreales
- Family: Nartheciaceae
- Genus: Aletris
- Species: A. obovata

Binomial name
- Aletris obovata Nash

Species of flowering plant

Aletris obovata (southern colicroot or white colic-root) is a plant species native to the southeastern United States (Mississippi, Alabama, Florida, and Georgia).

Aletris obovata grows in moist areas, such as pine woodlands and savannahs. It is a perennial herb up to 100 cm tall, with a long spike of small, cylindrical flowers. Flowers are usually white or cream-colored with brownish tips on the corolla lobes, the lobes bent inwards to give the flower an overall rounded, ovoid or obovoid (egg-shaped) shape with only a narrow opening at the tip. It is usually pollinated by butterflies.
