= Tulpehocken =

Tulpehocken may refer to:

In New Jersey:

- Tulpehocken Creek (New Jersey), a tributary of the Wading River

In Pennsylvania:

- Tulpehocken Creek (Pennsylvania), a tributary of the Schuylkill River
- Tulpehocken station, a commuter rail station in the Northwest section of Philadelphia
- Tulpehocken Manor Plantation, historic farm in Myerstown
- Tulpehocken Station Historic District, Philadelphia
- Tulpehocken Township, Pennsylvania, a township in Berks County
- Upper Tulpehocken Township, Pennsylvania, a township in Berks County
