= Narthecium californicum =

Scientific classification
- Kingdom: Plantae
- Clade: Tracheophytes
- Clade: Angiosperms
- Clade: Monocots
- Order: Dioscoreales
- Family: Nartheciaceae
- Genus: Narthecium
- Species: N. californicum

Binomial name
- Narthecium californicum Baker

Species of flowering plant

Narthecium californicum is a species of flowering plant known by the common name California bog asphodel. It is native to the mountains of southern Oregon and northern California, where it grows in wet habitat such as streambanks and meadows. It is a rhizomatous perennial monocot producing an erect stem up to about 60 centimeters tall. The base of the plant is surrounded by linear, grasslike leaves up to 30 centimeters long. The inflorescence is a raceme of many yellow flowers with six pointed tepals no more than a centimeter long. The fruit is a lance-shaped capsule containing many bristle-tailed seeds.
