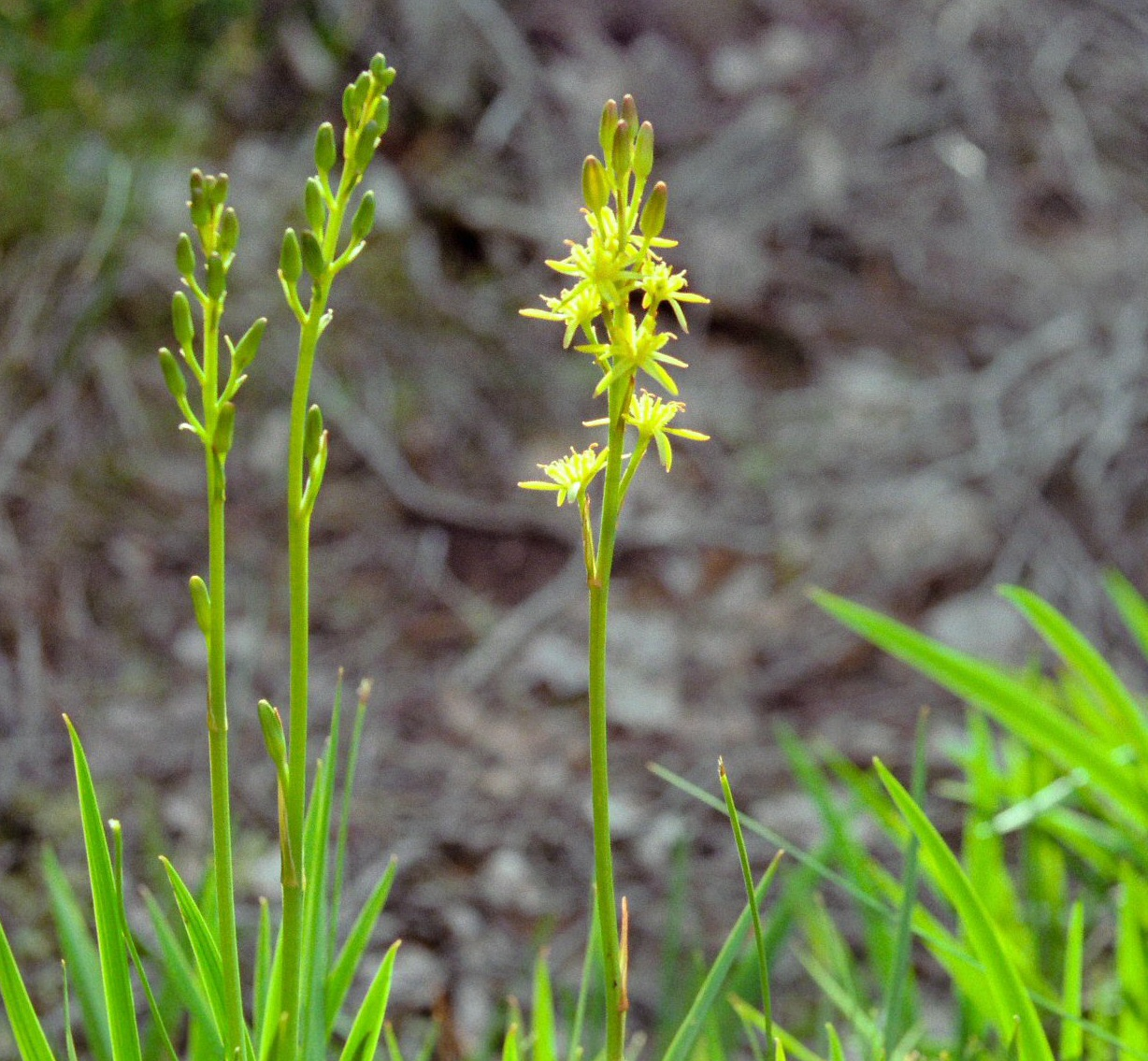

Scientific classification
- Kingdom: Plantae
- Clade: Tracheophytes
- Clade: Angiosperms
- Clade: Monocots
- Order: Dioscoreales
- Family: Nartheciaceae
- Genus: Narthecium
- Species: N. ossifragum

Binomial name
- Narthecium ossifragum (L.) Huds.

= Narthecium ossifragum =

Species of flowering plant in the family Nartheciaceae

Narthecium ossifragum, commonly known as bog asphodel, Lancashire asphodel or bastard asphodel, is a species of flowering plant in the family Nartheciaceae. It is native to Western Europe, found on wet, boggy moorlands up to about 1,000 m (3,300 ft) in elevation. It produces spikes of bright yellow flowers in summer. The bright orange fruits have been used as a colourant to replace saffron by Shetland Islanders. Despite the plant's English name "bog asphodel", it is not particularly closely related to the true asphodels. In addition to other forms of pollination, this plant is adapted to rain-pollination. The Latin specific name ossifragum means "bone-breaker", and refers to a traditional belief that eating the plant caused sheep to develop brittle bones. The probable origin of this story is that sheep eating a calcium-poor diet are likely to develop bone weakness, and N. ossifragum favours acidic low-calcium soils.

== Description ==
Bog asphodel is a tufted, hairless herbaceous perennial with a creeping rhizome. The leaves are up to 6 in (15 cm) long, narrow, flattened and sword-shaped, and often tinged with orange. The inflorescence is a spike with bright yellow, star-like flowers about 0.7 in (18 mm) across, which have short white hairs on the orange stamens. The fruits are deep orange.

== Biology ==
The plant can cause photosensitisation, a serious skin condition of sheep called alveld, "elf fire", in Norway. It can be relieved by moving stock into the shade. Not all stands of the plant are toxic, and the toxicity may be the side effect of the plant's response to a fungal infection.

== Distribution and habitat ==
The Bog asphodel has a temperate oceanic distribution in northern and western Europe. In the British Isles it occurs in Scotland, Northwest England, Wales, Southwest England and most of Ireland. It grows in wet soils and peats, in bogs, wet heaths and flushes. It can be found in purple moor grass and rush pastures.

== Gallery ==
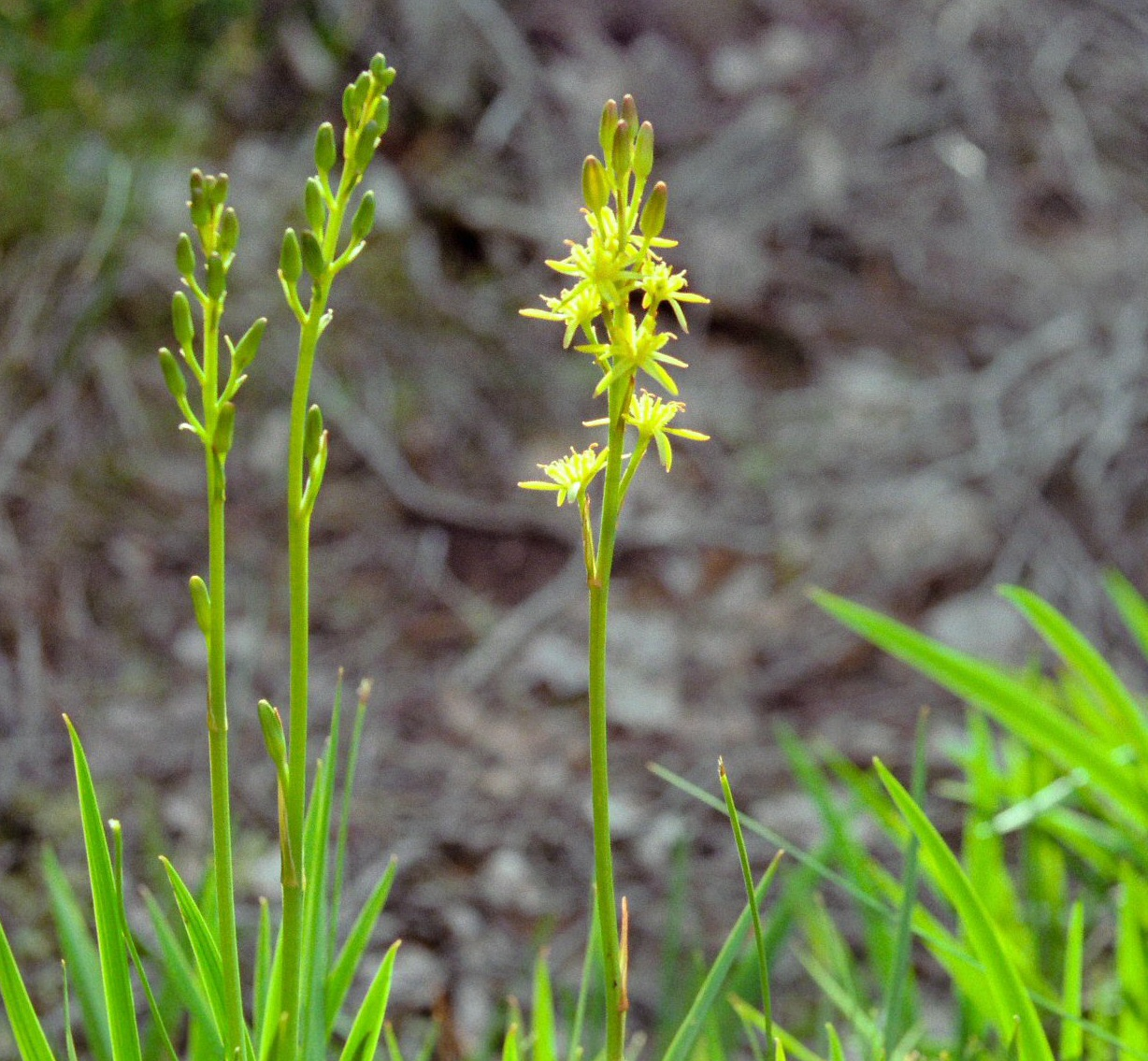

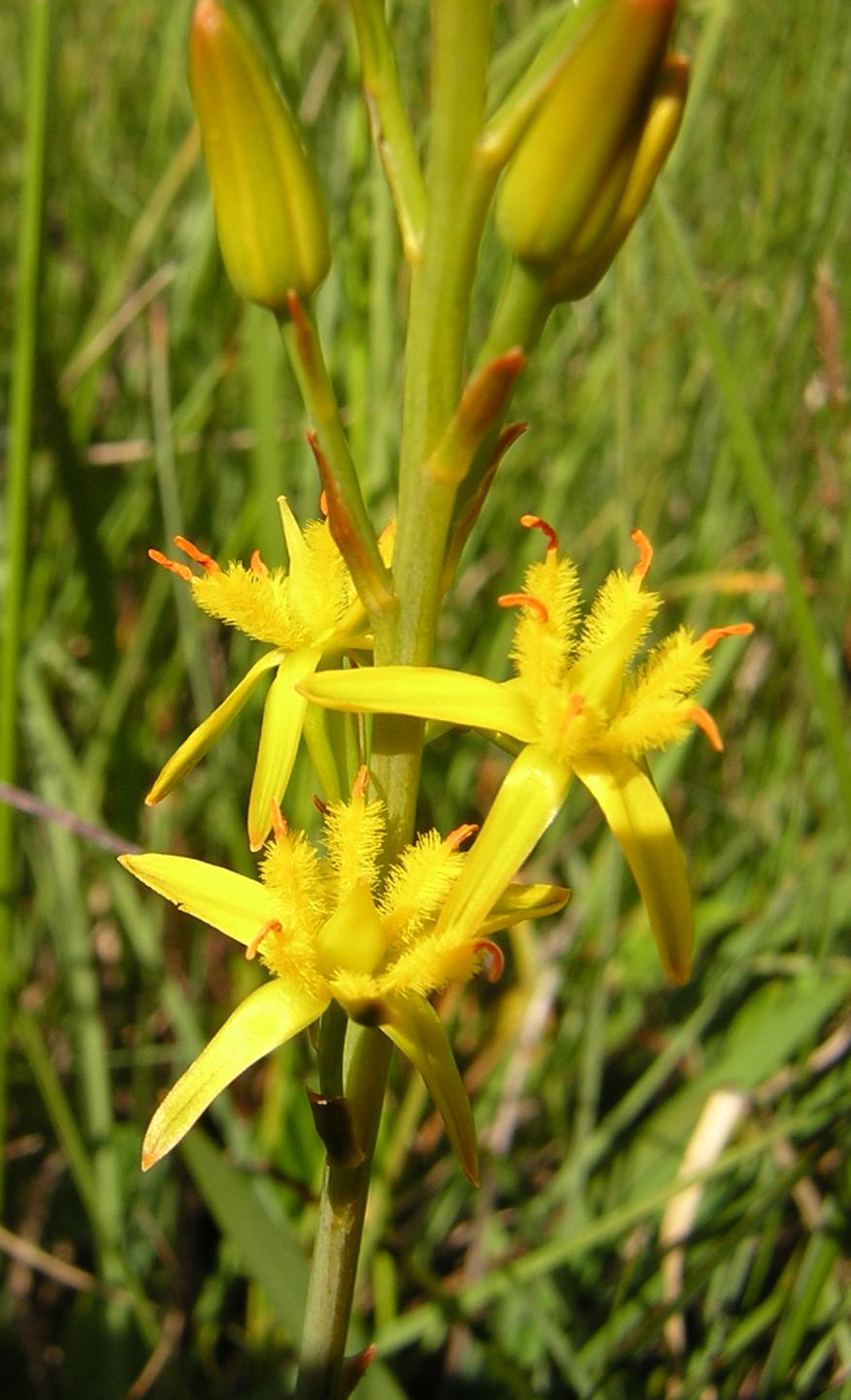

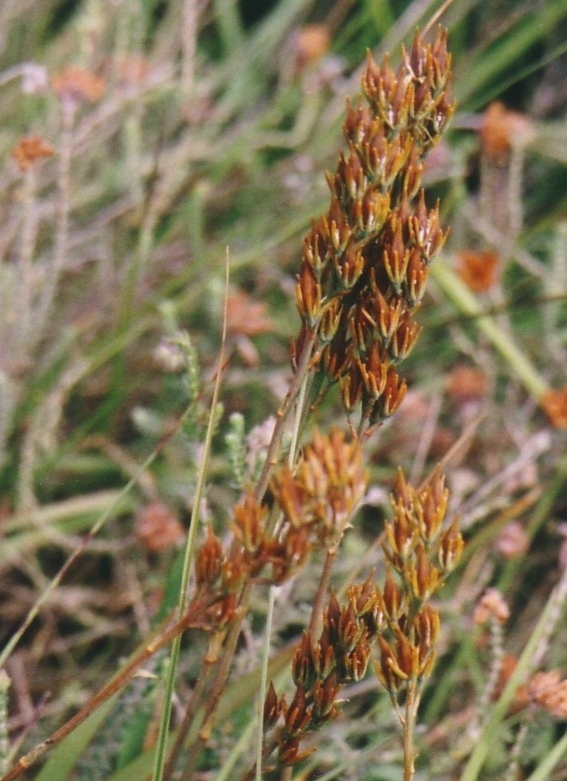
Fruiting

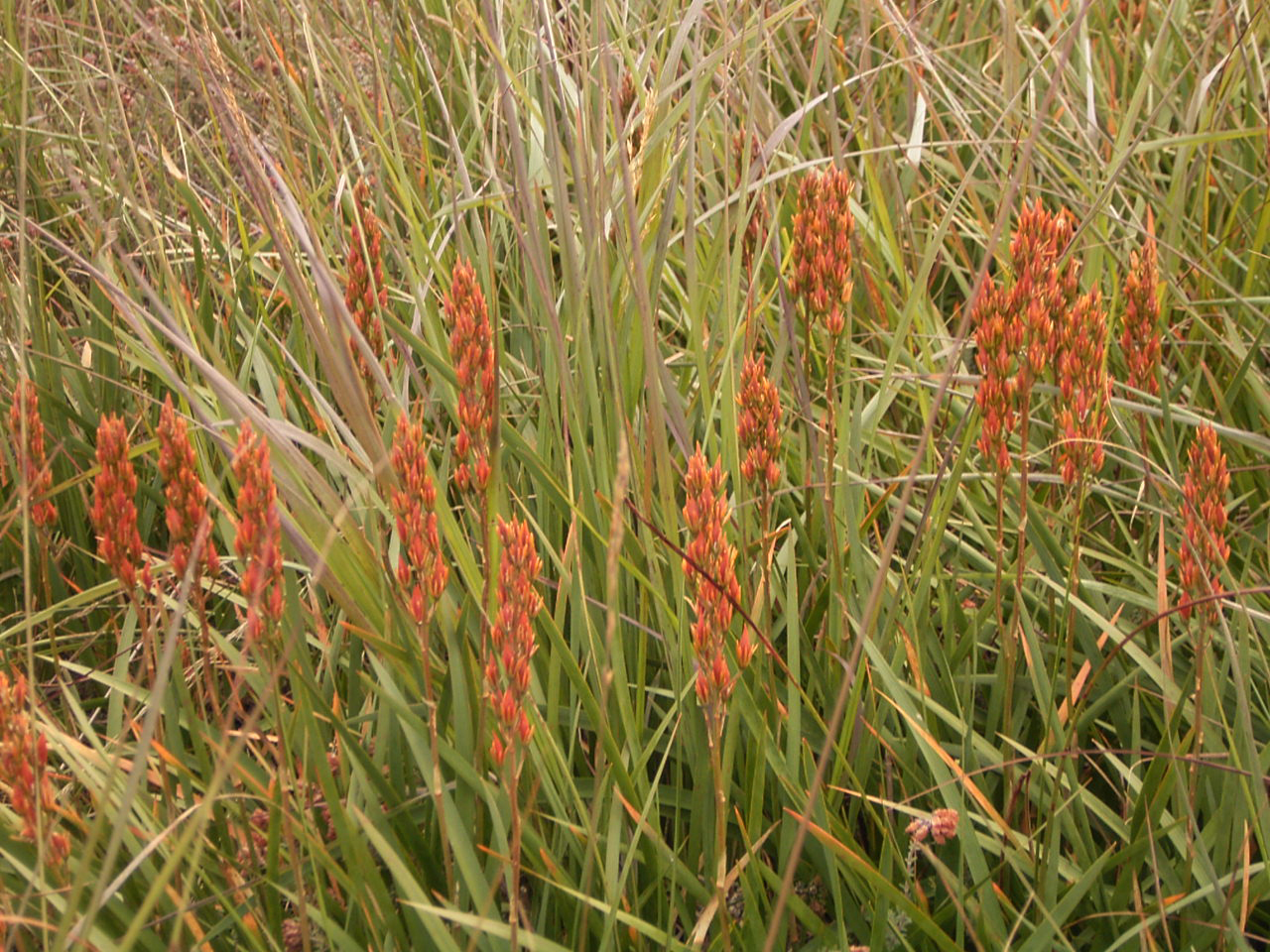
In fruit

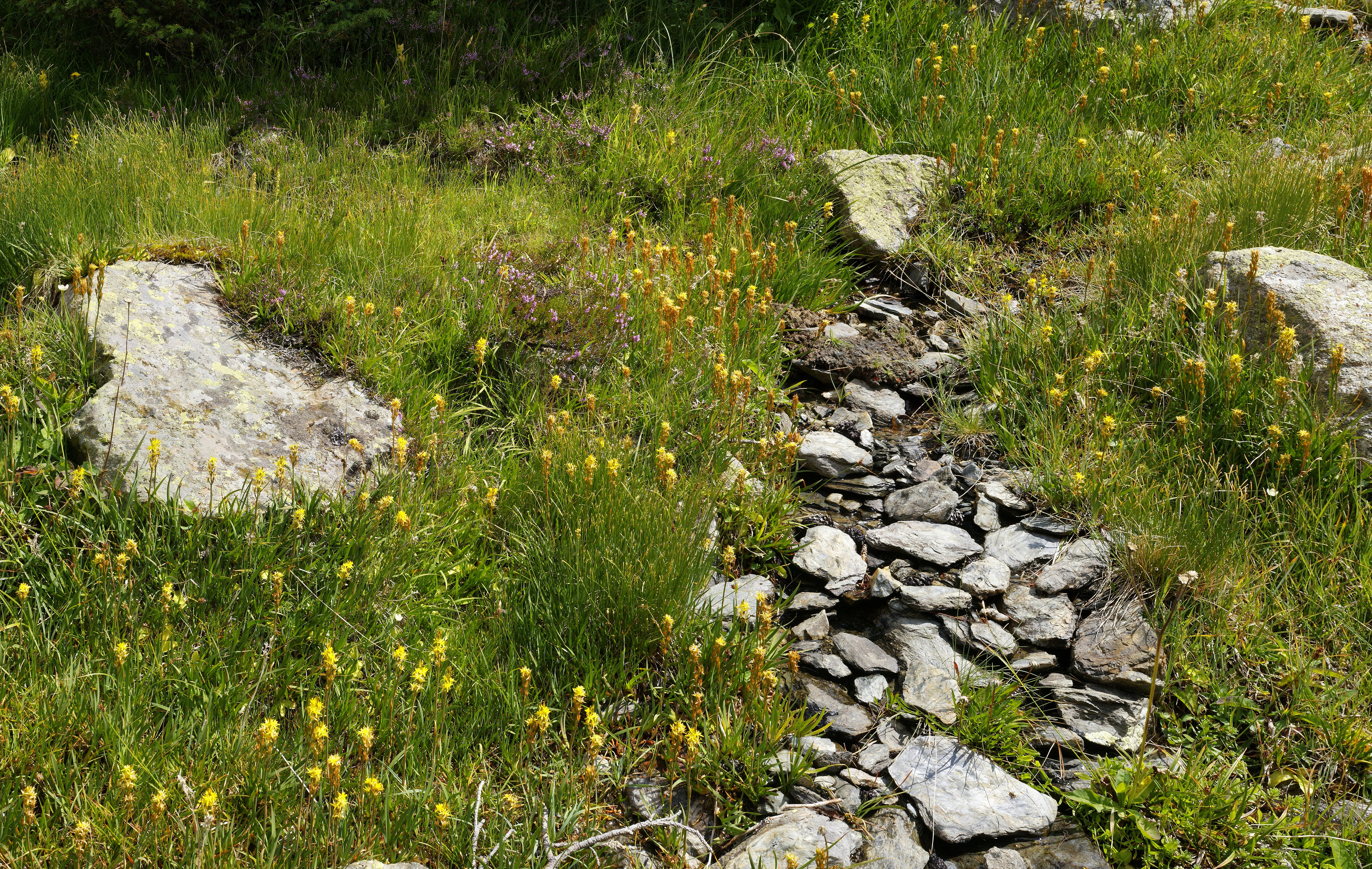
In situ near El Serrat, Andorra

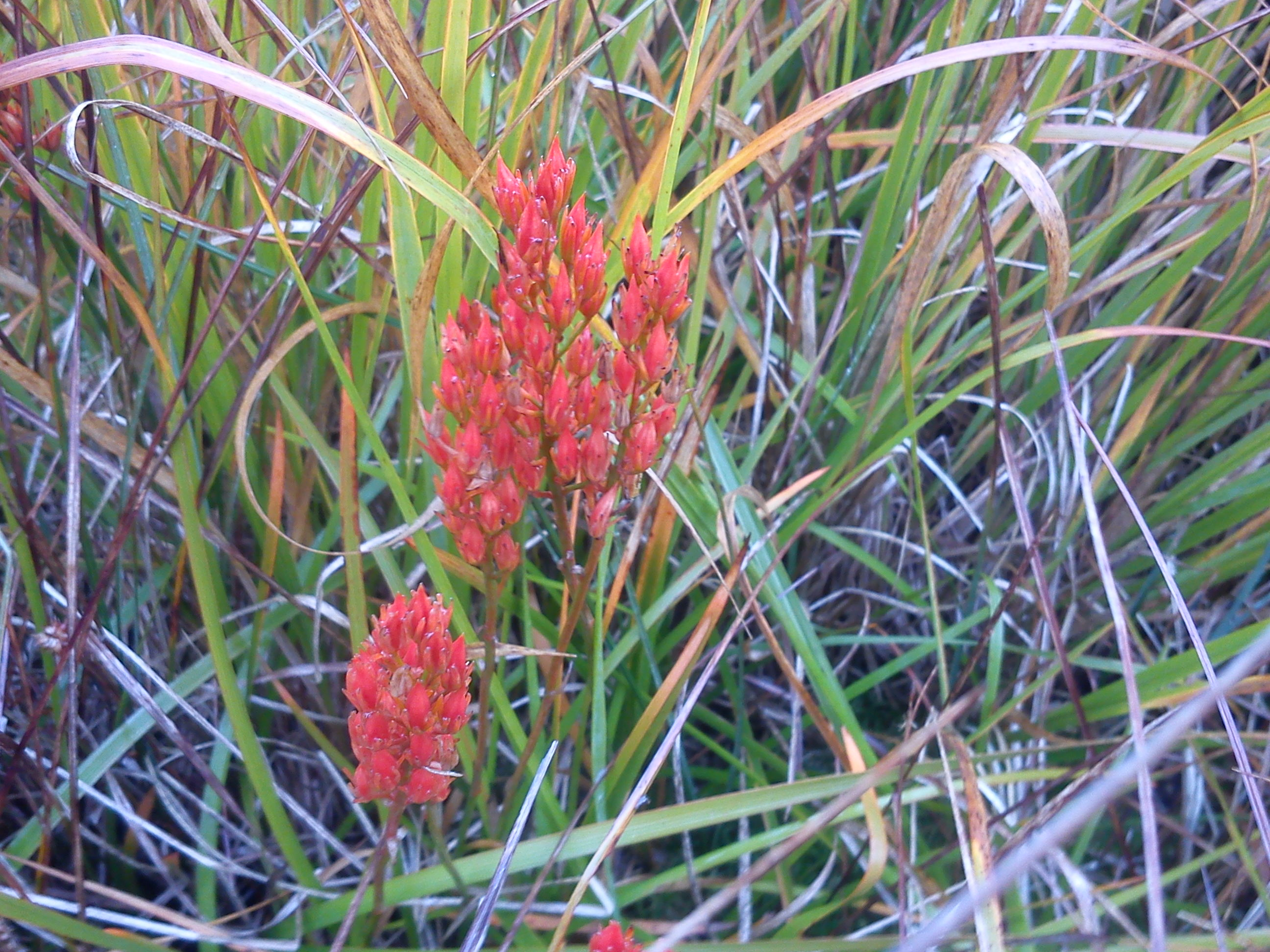
High Fens, Belgium

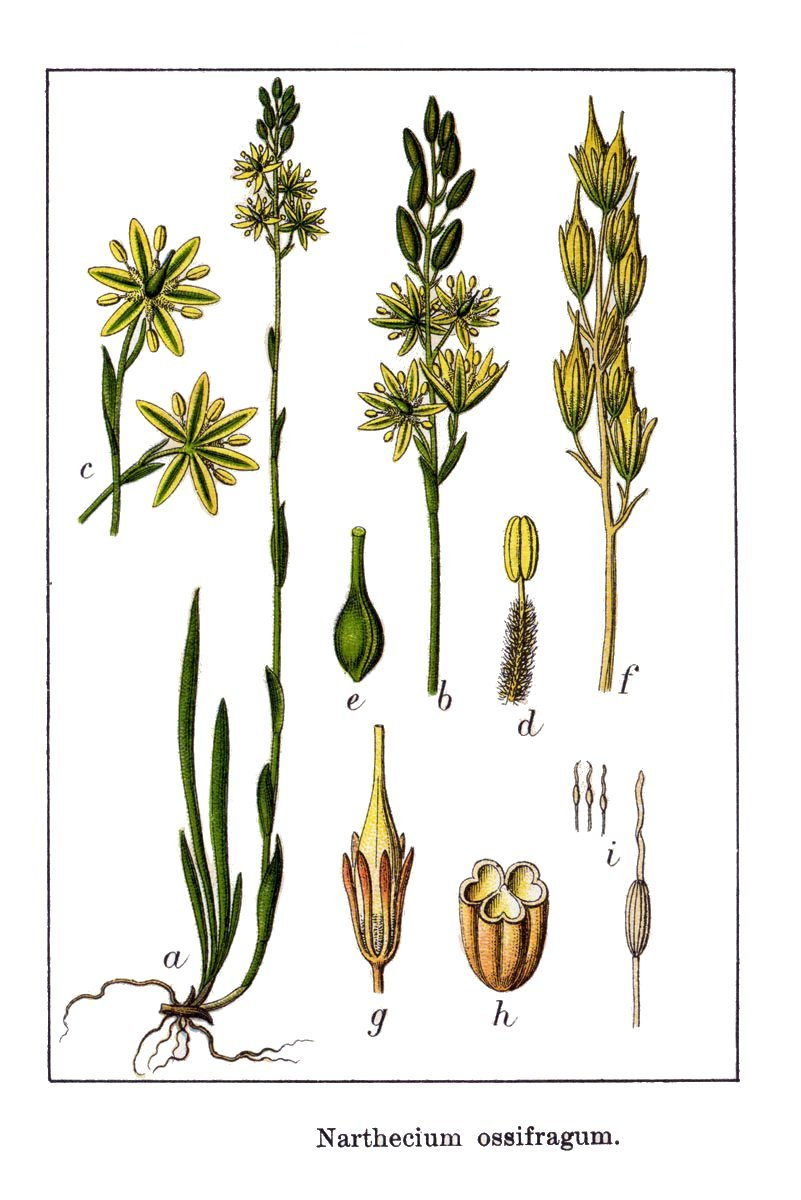
Illustration in Jakob Sturm: "Deutschlands Flora in Abbildungen", Stuttgart (1796)

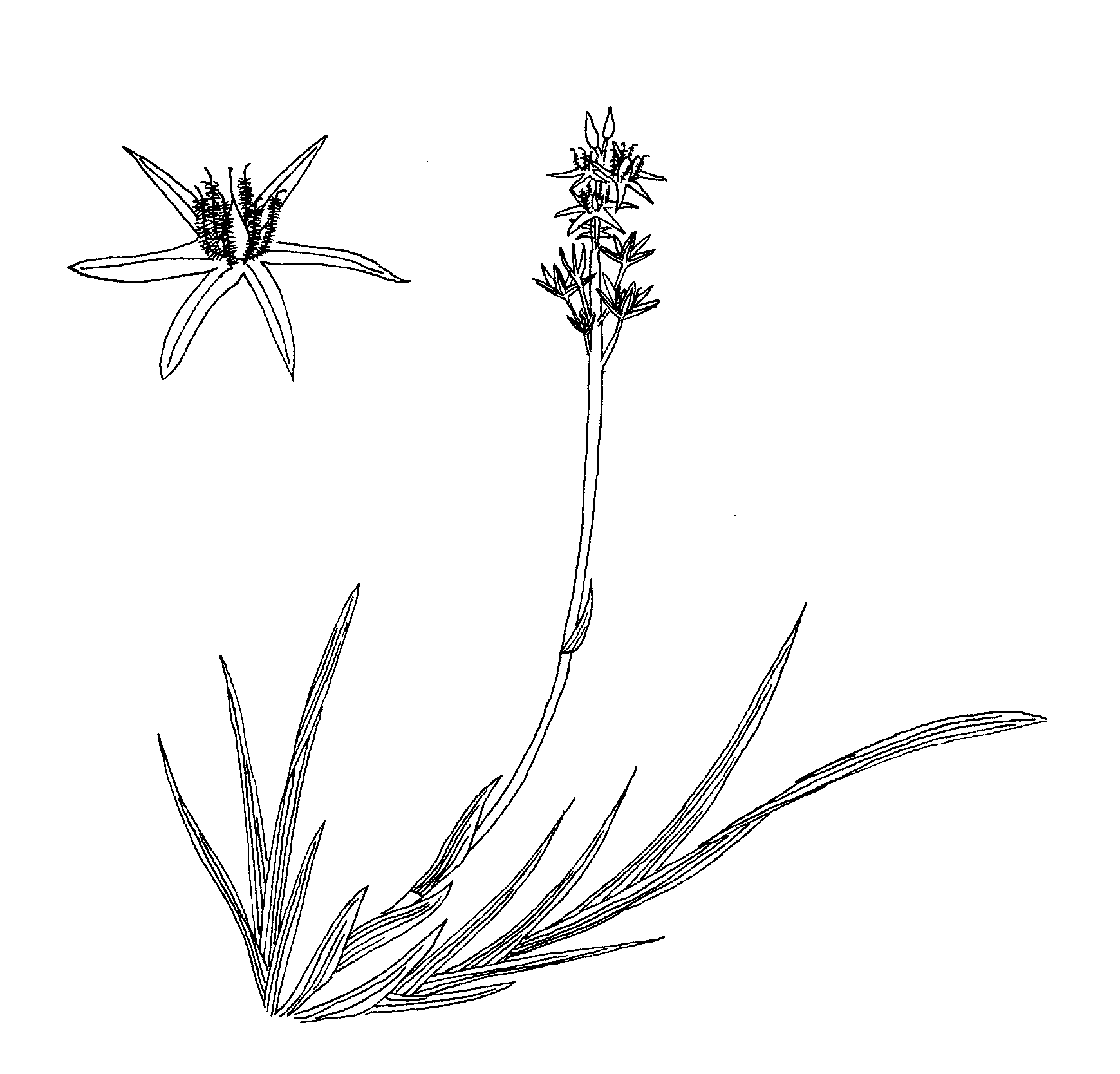
Drawing by Elly Waterman
