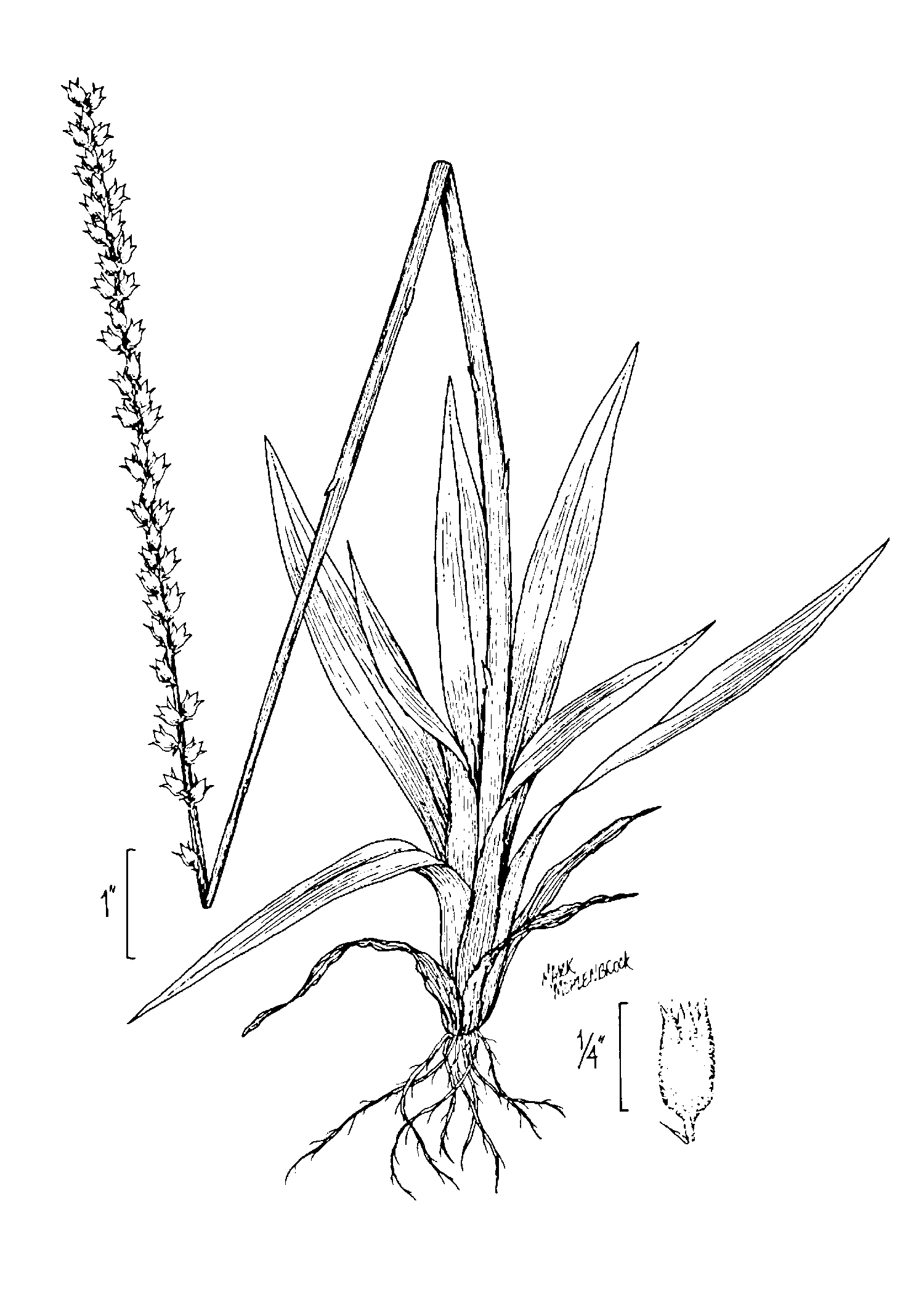
- Golden Unicorn Root

Conservation status
- Secure (NatureServe)

Scientific classification
- Kingdom: Plantae
- Clade: Tracheophytes
- Clade: Angiosperms
- Clade: Monocots
- Order: Dioscoreales
- Family: Nartheciaceae
- Genus: Aletris
- Species: A. aurea

Binomial name
- Aletris aurea Walter

Synonyms
- Wurmbea bullata (Walter) Willd.

= Aletris aurea =

Species of flowering plant

Aletris aurea (golden unicorn root) is a plant species native to the southeastern United States from eastern Texas and southeastern Oklahoma to Maryland.

Aletris aurea is a perennial herb up to 80 cm tall, with a long spike of small, golden-yellow, bell-shaped flowers.
