= Caboose (disambiguation) =

A caboose is a crewed railroad car at the end of a freight train in North America.

Caboose may also refer to:

- The Red Caboose/Caboose/CB, a character in ALW's Starlight Express musical.
- Caboose (ship's galley), a ship's kitchen above deck
- Caboose (Red vs. Blue), a character in the video series Red vs. Blue.
- Caboose (film), a 1996 Canadian film directed by Richard Roy.
- "Caboose", a song by Sugar Ray from Lemonade and Brownies.
- Mrs. Crabbople's Caboose a children's television series, with set design, and puppetry by Wayne White (artist), shortly before working on Pee-wee's Playhouse.

== Use as slang ==
- A slang for Buttocks, due to a caboose being the "rear end" of a train
- A slang for Bustle, which is a padded undergarment used to add fullness, or support the drapery, at the back of women's dresses in the mid-to-late 19th century.
