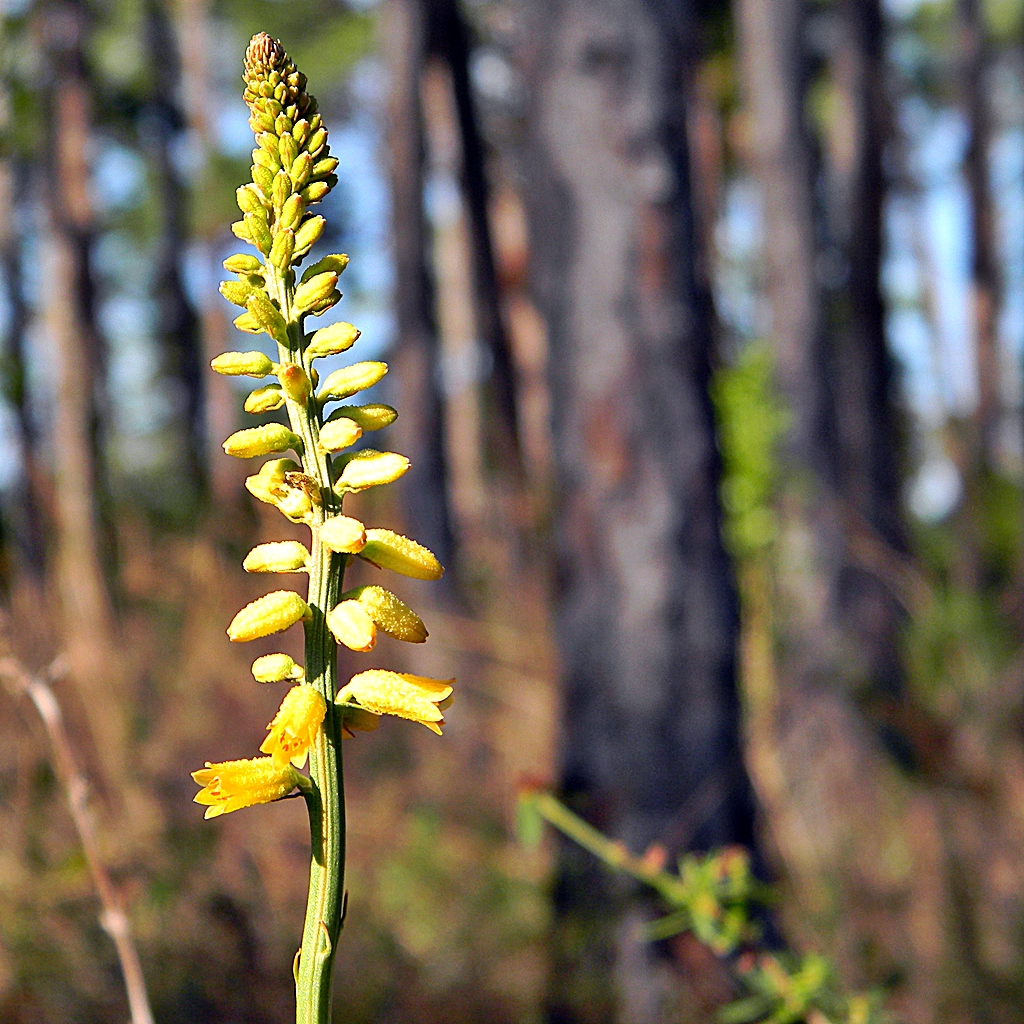
- Aletris lutea just starting to open in Palm Beach County, Florida.

Conservation status
- Apparently Secure (NatureServe)

Scientific classification
- Kingdom: Plantae
- Clade: Tracheophytes
- Clade: Angiosperms
- Clade: Monocots
- Order: Dioscoreales
- Family: Nartheciaceae
- Genus: Aletris
- Species: A. lutea

Binomial name
- Aletris lutea Walter

Synonyms
- Aletris lutea f. albiflora E.T.Browne

= Aletris lutea =

Species of flowering plant

Aletris lutea (Yellow colic-root) is a plant species native to the southeastern United States from Louisiana to Georgia.

Aletris lutea grows in wet areas, especially seasonally flooded pine forests near the coast. It is a perennial herb up to 100 cm tall, with a long spike of small, cylindrical flowers. Flowers are usually yellow but sometimes white.

== Ecology ==
Aletris lutea is insect pollinated and is recorded to have been visited in northern Florida by the bee species Megachile campanulae.
