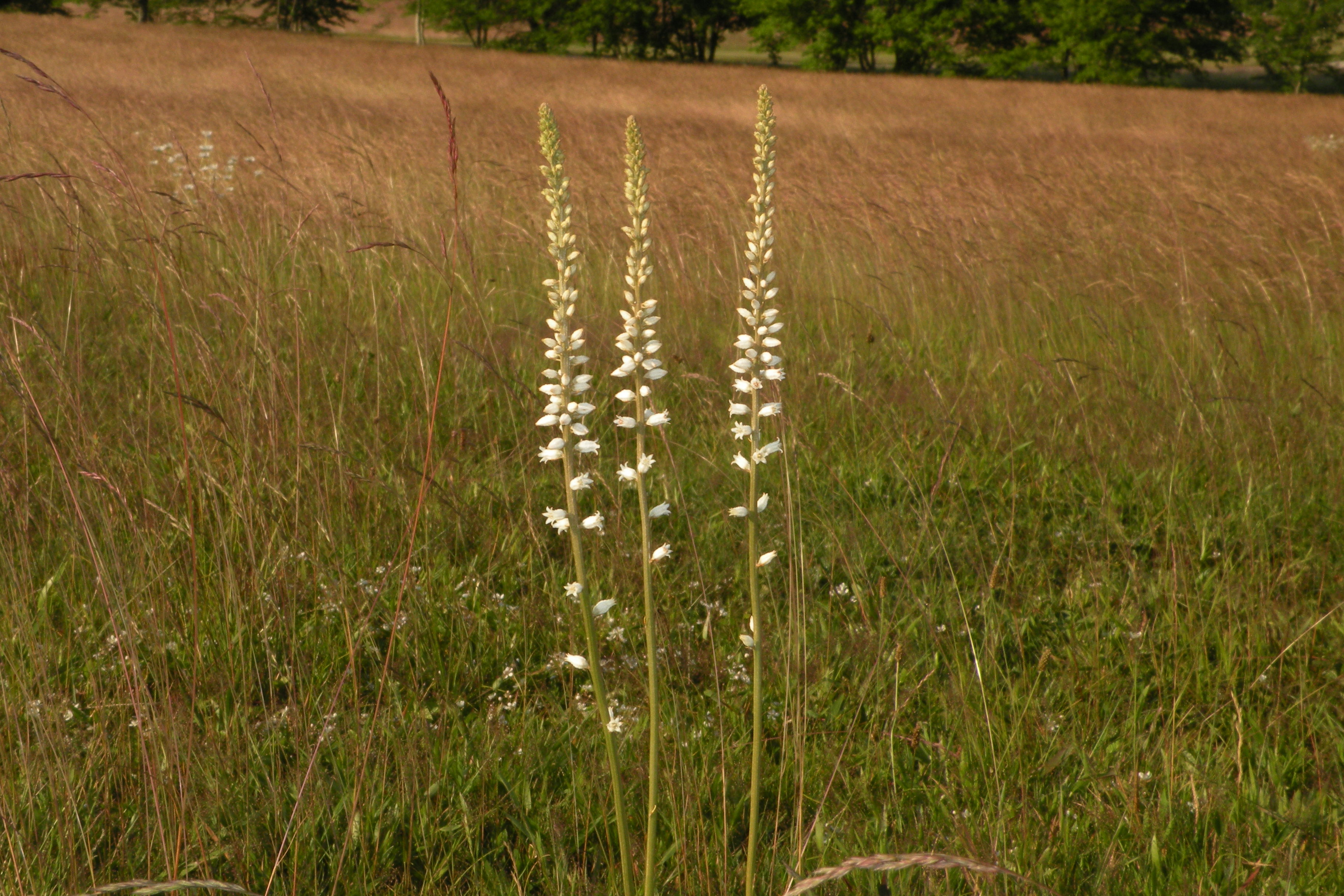
- Aletris farinosa in West Greenwich, Rhode Island

Scientific classification
- Kingdom: Plantae
- Clade: Tracheophytes
- Clade: Angiosperms
- Clade: Monocots
- Order: Dioscoreales
- Family: Nartheciaceae
- Genus: Aletris
- Species: A. farinosa

Binomial name
- Aletris farinosa L.

Synonyms
- Aletris alba Michx.; Aletris lucida Raf.

= Aletris farinosa =

Species of flowering plant

Aletris farinosa, called the unicorn root, true unicorn, crow-corn, white colic-root or white stargrass, is a plant species found across much of the eastern United States. It has also been reported from the southern part of Ontario, Canada. It is known from every state east of the Mississippi River except Vermont, as well as Texas, Oklahoma, Arkansas and Louisiana. Its native habitats include moist peaty, sandy or gravelly areas.

Aletris farinosa is a perennial herb spreading by means of underground rhizomes and forming rosettes of leaves. Leaves are narrow, up to 20 cm long, bright yellowish-green. Flowering stalks can be as much as 100 cm tall. Flowers are white, up to 10 mm long. Fruit is a dry capsule tapering at the tip.

== Gallery ==
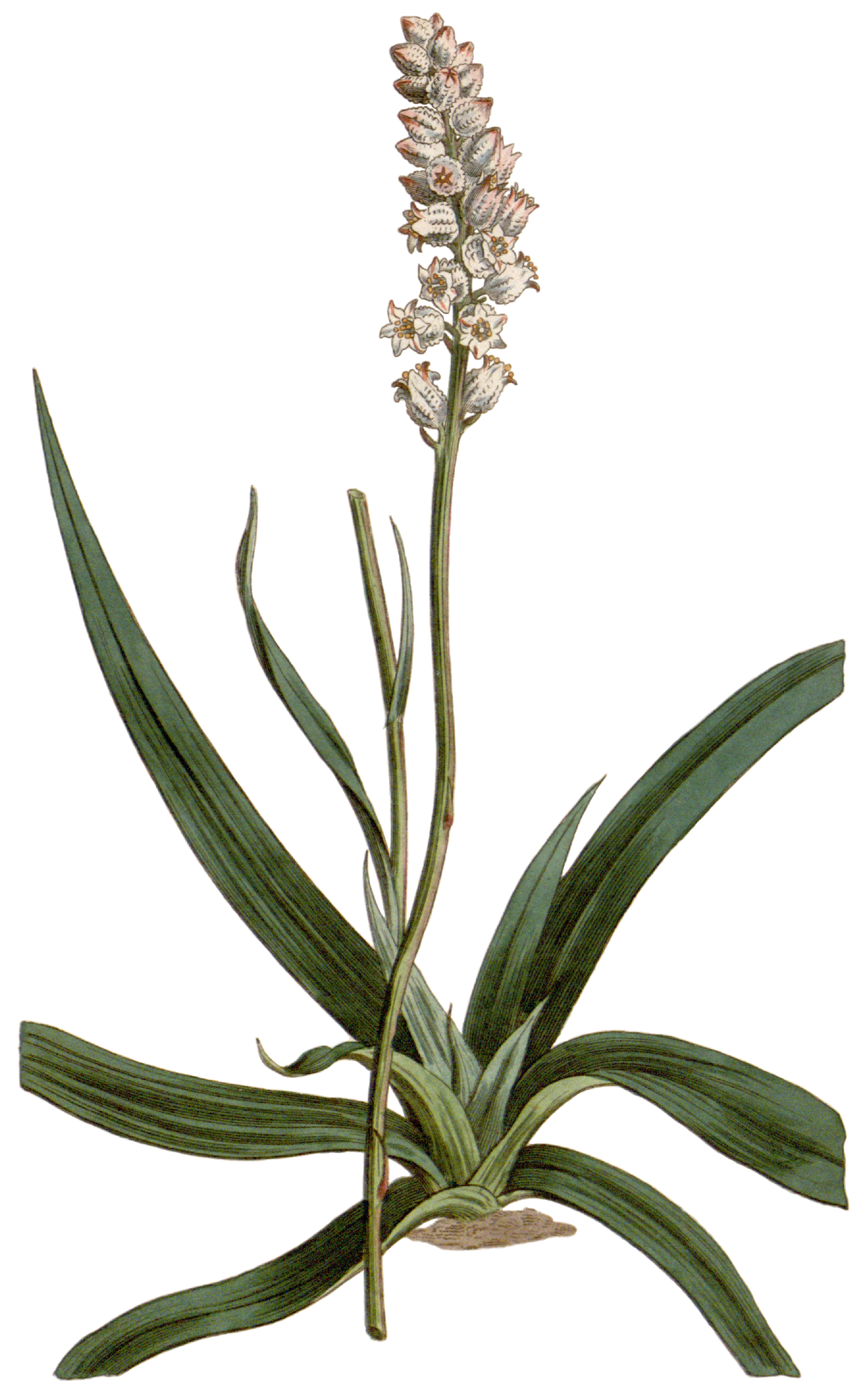
Illustration by Sydenham Edwards

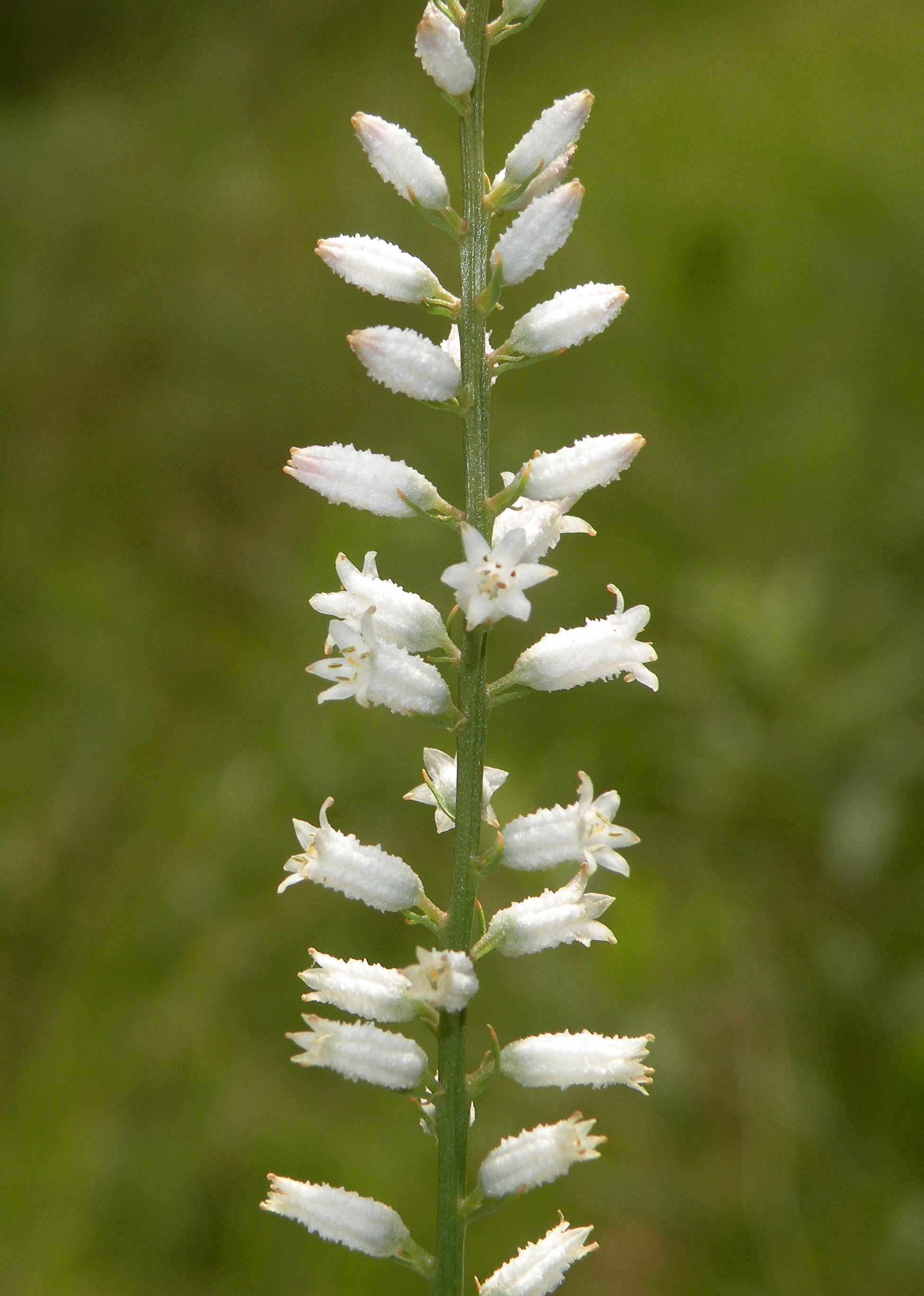
Inflorescence in Barnstable, Massachusetts

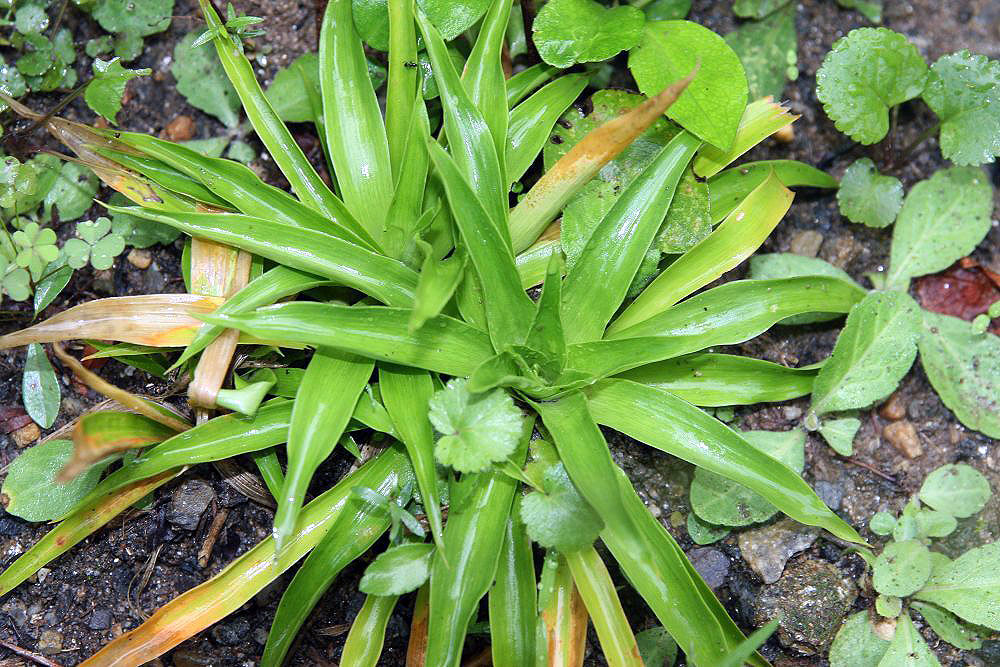
Leaves at the Asheville Botanical Gardens
