= Oswego River =

Oswego River may refer to the following:

- Oswego River (New Jersey), a tributary of the Wading River in New Jersey
- Oswego River (New York), a tributary of Lake Ontario in New York
