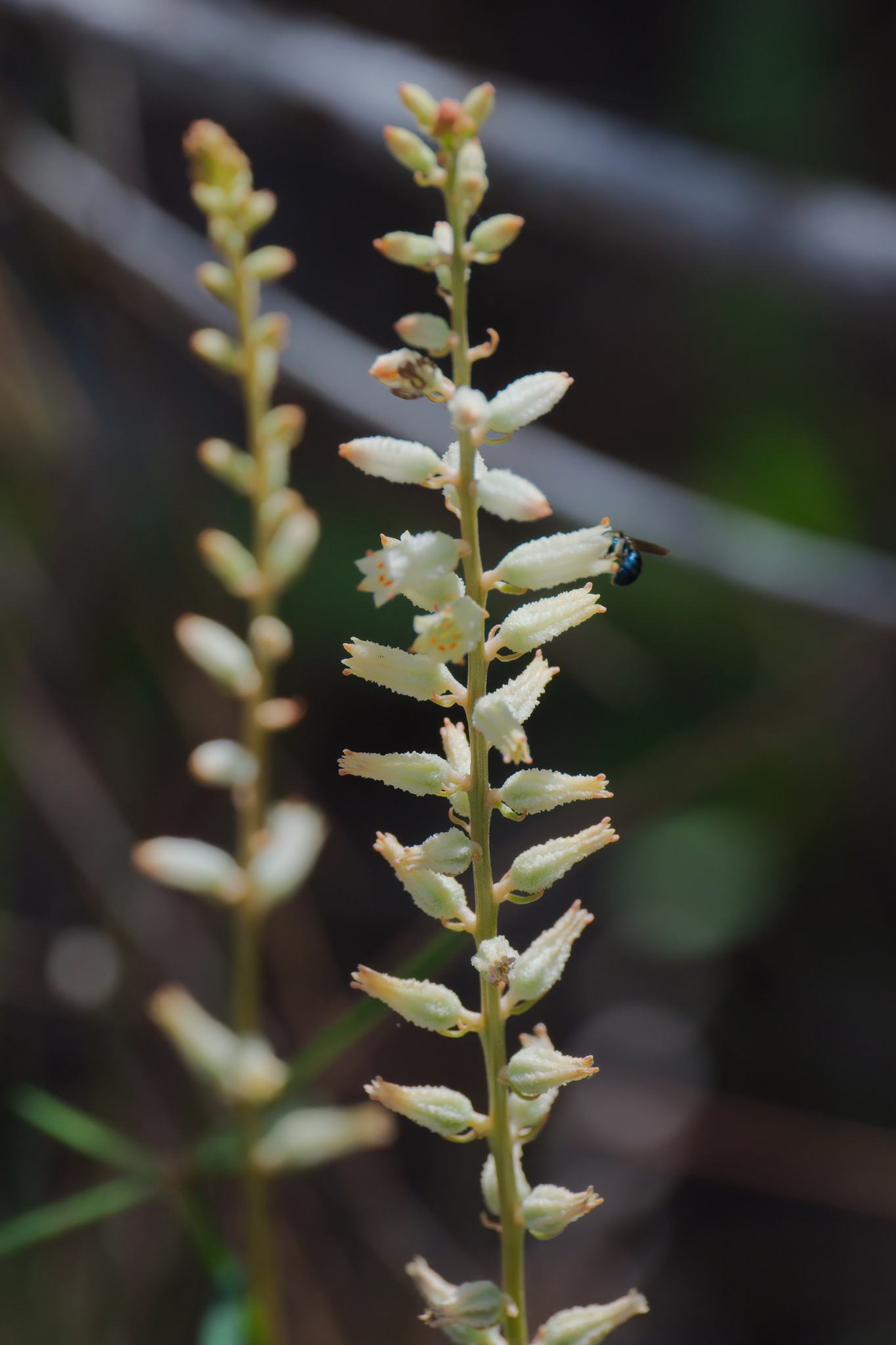

Conservation status
- Imperiled (NatureServe)

Scientific classification
- Kingdom: Plantae
- Clade: Tracheophytes
- Clade: Angiosperms
- Clade: Monocots
- Order: Dioscoreales
- Family: Nartheciaceae
- Genus: Aletris
- Species: A. bracteata

Binomial name
- Aletris bracteata Northr.

= Aletris bracteata =

Species of flowering plant

Aletris bracteata, the bracted colicroot, is a plant species native to southern Florida (Monroe and Miami-Dade Counties) and to the Bahamas (Andros and Abaco Islands). It grows in the Everglades and other wet areas very close to sea level. Some hybridization between this species and the yellow-flowered A. lutea has been noted.

Aletris bracteata is a perennial herb up to 60 cm tall, spreading by means of underground rhizomes. Flowers are white, about 7 mm long.
