= Martha Furnace (New Jersey) =

Coordinates: 39.6828°N 74.5109°W

Martha Furnace is an abandoned iron furnace in Burlington County, New Jersey, in the New Jersey Pine Barrens. It operated between 1793 and the mid-1840s, using charcoal fuel and locally mined bog iron to make a variety of cast products as well as pig iron. For most of its operating history, it was principally owned by the New Jersey ironmaster Samuel Richards and managed by Jesse Evans. The settlement that grew up around it was abandoned after ironmaking ceased, and the site of the furnace now lies undeveloped in Wharton State Forest.

== Founding ==
The furnace was built in 1793 by the ironmaster Isaac Potts of Pennsylvania, who named it for his wife. It was located on the Oswego River about 2 miles (3 km) upstream of Harrisville, New Jersey, where Potts built a slitting mill and a forge in 1795. (These could convert pig iron from blast furnaces into rods for making nails and into wrought iron, respectively.) The furnace went into blast on September 29, 1793, and the first casting was made there in the early hours of the following day.

Iron furnaces require supplies of iron ore, fuel, and flux. In southern New Jersey, bog ore supplied the iron, while the fuel was charcoal made from large tracts of timber. The charcoal was hauled to the furnace by teams from charcoal pits in the woods, while the bog iron was dug at streamside and floated downriver. Clam and oyster shells provided the flux. To obtain these resources, Potts bought up extensive tracts of land in the area, at one time holding nearly 60,000 acres (200 km^{2}) of land. In February 1796, Potts decided to sell off some of his enterprises, and offered Martha Furnace and about 20,000 acres (80 km^{2}) of land for sale.

== Sale and operation ==
Potts did not find a purchaser until 1800, when a consortium of four Philadelphians, John Paul, Morris Robeson, Charles Shoemaker, and George Garrit Ashbridge bought Martha and formed the Martha Furnace Company to operate it. They, in turn, offered the furnace for sale in 1805. By this time a stamping mill had also been erected as part of the furnace complex. It could crush slag from the furnace to be recycled as part of the furnace charge to recover more of its iron content. Finding no immediate buyers, they hired a new manager, the Quaker Jesse Evans, to operate it. He would continue at Martha until its closure. Paul, Robeson, and Shoemaker sold their interest in the furnace to Samuel Richards and his cousin Joseph Ball in 1808; Richards was the owner of several Pine Barrens furnaces, and Ball had interests in others.

The first seven years of operations under its new ownership are better documented than in many other furnaces, due to the survival of a daybook, known as the "Martha Diary", kept by the furnace clerk. While principally concerned with recording the work done by teamsters and others, it includes many terse observations on the social life of the Martha Furnace community. The need for colliers, teamsters, the skilled artisans who operated the furnace, and ancillary services such as carpentry had caused a grist and saw mill and many dwellings to be built around the furnace as early as 1796. The furnace was built at the base of a steep hill, from which a charging bridge extended to the top of the furnace stack. The Oswego River was dammed to provide power, via a mill race and water wheel, for the blowing tubs that drove the air blast into the furnace. On the hill, charcoal, ore, and flux were stored, mixed and charged into the furnace. Under cover of the molding shed at the base, the molten iron flowing from the furnace could be cast into pig iron, or into various shaped products such as stove parts and cambosses, shot, sash weights, and kettles for sugar refining. The community included a one-room school, and, apparently, a crude hospital.

The furnace and warehouse were "entirely consumed" by fire on June 2, 1813, but the fire did not spread to the nearby town and no lives were lost. The owners rebuilt it and it returned to blast on August 11. Generally, Martha Furnace was kept in blast from spring until early January, when ice interfered with water power and forced its closure for the winter. The Martha Diary ends in 1815, after which fewer details of its operations are known. Samuel Richards bought out Ball's interest in 1822, after the latter's death, and Ashbridge's interest after he died in 1829. By 1834, the furnace was producing about 750 tons of castings annually and employed about 60 workers. With their families and children, about 400 people lived in the vicinity of Martha at the time.

The development of hot blast, anthracite-fueled iron furnaces in Pennsylvania during the 1840s began to render Martha Furnace uneconomical. It was apparently still operating in 1841, when Richards sold the furnace and its accompanying lands to Jesse Evans, the long-time manager. It went out of blast permanently sometime in the mid-1840s; colliers continued to make charcoal on the tract for sale in Philadelphia until 1848. The furnace lands and the abandoned furnace passed through a series of purchasers after that. One of the owners, Francis B. Chetwood, hoped to develop the "Oswego Tract", anticipating that the Raritan and Delaware Bay Railroad would locate its line along the Oswego through Martha on the way south to Cape May. This survey was never taken up by the railroad and Chetwood's plans proved abortive. Much of the Martha lands, including the site of the ruined furnace, were bought by Joseph Wharton in 1896. Wharton's estate ultimately sold his Pine Barrens holdings to the State of New Jersey in 1954, and the ruins of Martha are now located in Wharton State Forest.

== Remains ==
Few visible remains are now present at the site of Martha Furnace. The breaching of the dam drained Martha Pond, although it still exists as a widened stretch of the Oswego River upstream of the furnace. After an investigation by state archaeologist Budd Wilson in 1968, the ruins of the furnace stack were covered with sand and fenced off during the 1970s to prevent casual vandalism. The Batona Trail crosses the Oswego River on a former road bridge just below the dam and passes the site of the furnace.

== Notes and references ==
=== Works cited ===
- Coritz, Cynthia L. (June 19, 1995). Oswego River Natural Area Management Plan (PDF) (Report).
- Gordon, Robert B. (2001). American Iron 1607–1900. Baltimore, Maryland: Johns Hopkins University Press. ISBN 0-8018-6816-5.
- Pierce, Arthur D. (1957). Iron in the Pines. New Brunswick, New Jersey: Rutgers University Press. ISBN 0-8135-0514-3.
