= Martha Furnace =

Martha Furnace may refer to several iron furnaces and the communities surrounding them:

- Martha Furnace (New Jersey), an iron furnace in Burlington County, New Jersey
- Martha Furnace, Illinois, a ghost town in Hardin County, Illinois
