= Nietneria =

Scientific classification
- Kingdom: Plantae
- Clade: Tracheophytes
- Clade: Angiosperms
- Clade: Monocots
- Order: Dioscoreales
- Family: Nartheciaceae
- Genus: Nietneria; Klotzsch ex Benth.

Species
- See text

Genus of flowering plants

Nietneria is a genus of plants in the Nartheciaceae. It has two known species, both native to northern South America.

== Species ==
The genus contains the following species:

- Nietneria corymbosa Klotzsch & M.R.Schomb. ex B.D.Jacks. - Guyana, Amazonas + Bolívar States in Venezuela
- Nietneria paniculata Steyerm. - Bolívar State in Venezuela, Guyana, Serra Aracá in the Brazilian State of Amazonas
