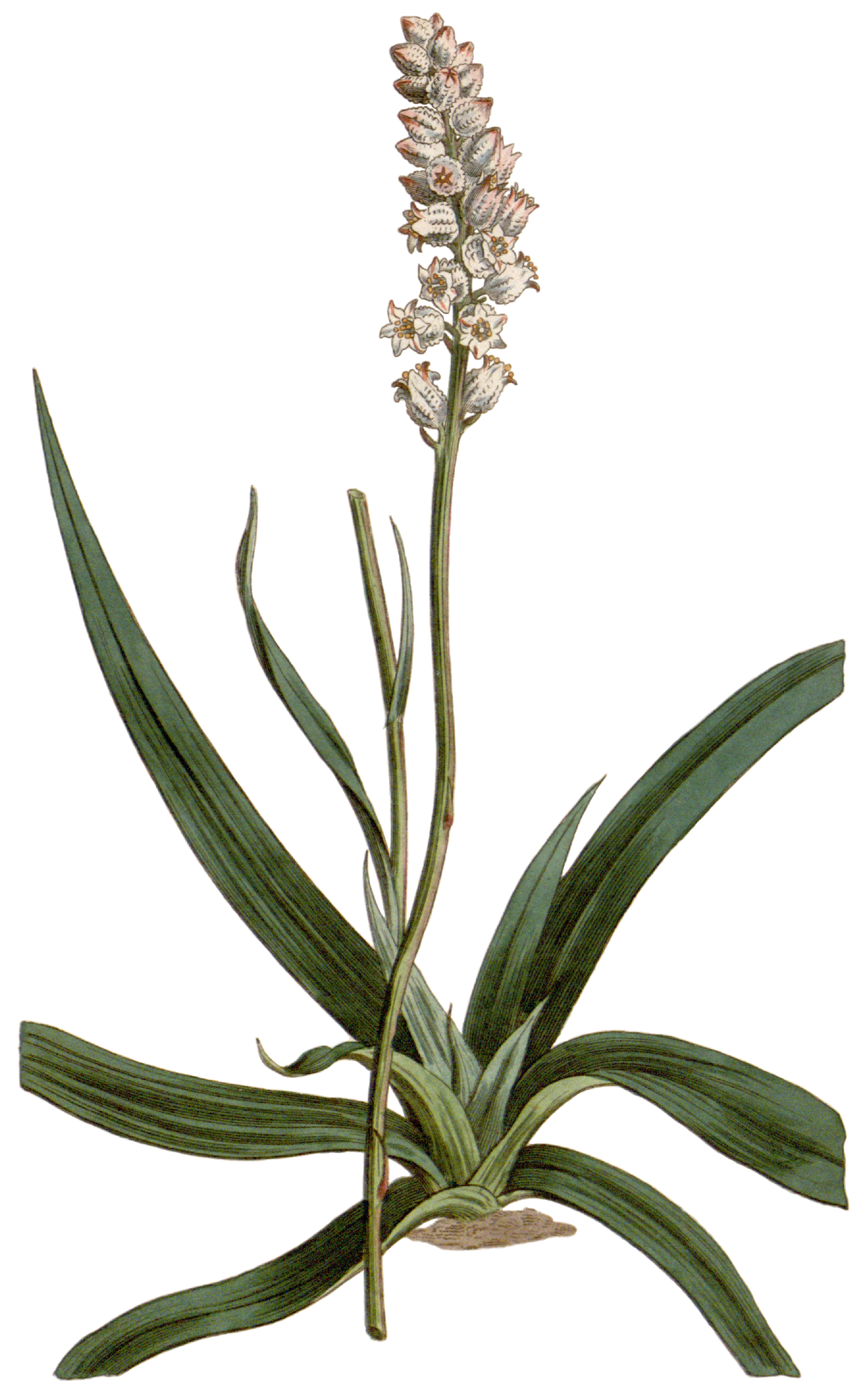
- Aletris farinosa 1811 illustration

Scientific classification
- Kingdom: Plantae
- Clade: Tracheophytes
- Clade: Angiosperms
- Clade: Monocots
- Order: Dioscoreales
- Family: Nartheciaceae
- Genus: Aletris; L.

Species
- See text

Synonyms
- Stachyopogon Klotzsch; Meta-aletris Masam.

= Aletris =

Genus of flowering plants

Aletris, the colicroot, colicweed, crow corn, or unicorn root, is a genus of flowering plants in the family Nartheciaceae, native to North America and to eastern and southeastern Asia, especially China. It was used as a component in Lydia Pinkham's original Vegetable Compound.

== Species ==
Aletris species include:

- Aletris alpestris Diels. - Guizhou, Shaanxi, Sichuan, Yunnan
- Aletris aurea Walter - from Texas and Oklahoma to Maryland
- Aletris bracteata Northr. - Florida, Bahamas
- Aletris capitata F.T.Wang & Tang - Sichuan
- Aletris cinerascens F.T.Wang & Tang - Yunnan, Guangxi
- Aletris farinosa L. - Ontario and much of eastern United States
- Aletris foliata (Maxim.) Makino & Nemoto - Korea, Japan
- Aletris foliolosa Stapf - Sumatra, Sabah, Mindoro
- Aletris foliosa (Maxim.) Bureau & Franch. - Japan
- Aletris glabra Bureau & Franch. - Nepal, Bhutan, Sikkim, Tibet, Fujian, Gansu, Guizhou, Hubei, Jiangxi, Shaanxi, Sichuan, Taiwan, Yunnan
- Aletris glandulifera Bureau & Franch. - Gansu, Shaanxi, Sichuan
- Aletris gracilis Rendle - Nepal, Bhutan, Arunachal Pradesh, Myanmar, Tibet, Yunnan
- Aletris laxiflora Bureau & Franch. - Tibet, Sichuan, Guizhou
- Aletris lutea Small - Florida, Georgia, Alabama, Mississippi, Louisiana
- Aletris medogensis Li, X. (2026)
- Aletris megalantha F.T.Wang & Tang - Yunnan
- Aletris nana S.C.Chen - Tibet, Yunnan, Nepal
- Aletris obovata Nash - - Florida, Georgia, Alabama, Mississippi, South Carolina
- Aletris pauciflora (Klotzsch) Hand.-Mazz - Tibet, Yunnan, Nepal, Bhutan, Assam, Myanmar, northern India
- Aletris pedicellata F.T.Wang & Tang - Sichuan
- Aletris scopulorum Dunn - Shikoku, Fujian, Guangdong, Hunan, Jiangxi, Zhejiang
- Aletris simpliciflora R.Li & Shu D.Zhang - Tibet
- Aletris spicata (Thunb.) Franch. - Philippines, Taiwan, Japan, Korea, Ryukyu Islands, much of China
- Aletris stenoloba Franch. - Gansu, Guangdong, Guangxi, Guizhou, Hubei, Shaanxi, Sichuan, Yunnan
- Aletris × tottenii E.T.Browne - Georgia (hybrid, A. lutea × A. obovata)
- Aletris yaanica G.H.Yang - Sichuan
