= Harrisville, New Jersey =

Populated place in Burlington County, New Jersey, US

- Unincorporated community
- Location in Burlington County (Inset: Burlington County in New Jersey) Harrisville (New Jersey) Harrisville (the United States)
- Coordinates: 39°39′41″N 74°31′19″W
- Country: United States
- State: New Jersey
- County: Burlington
- Township: Bass River
- Established: 1795
- Destroyed: 1914
- Named after: John and Richard Harris
- Elevation: 16 ft (4.9 m)
- Time zone: UTC−05:00 (Eastern (EST))
  - Summer (DST): UTC−04:00 (EDT)
- GNIS feature ID: 876972

Harrisville (also called Harrisia or McCartyville) is an unincorporated community and ghost town located about 6 miles (9.7 km) northwest of New Gretna within Bass River Township in Burlington County, in the U.S. state of New Jersey, in the New Jersey Pine Barrens.

The first industry at the site of Harrisville appears to have been a sawmill built by Evi Belangee no later than 1760. Near the mouth of the Oswego River, where its floodplain narrowed, he built a dam with 5 or 6 feet of head to run his mill. The dam was enlarged in 1795, when a slitting mill, for cutting iron sheet into strips for nailmaking, was built at the site by Isaac Potts. Potts had recently built Martha Furnace upstream, and when he sold the latter in 1796, he noted that its pig iron would have a natural market at the slitting mill. This business was not very successful, and about 1815 it was converted to a paper plant, powered by water brought by a canal from a dam on the Oswego, a tributary of the Wading River. The town which was built around the factory was originally called McCartyville after the factory owner; when the Harris family bought the factory in 1855, the name was changed to Harrisville. Under the Harris family, Harrisville was a company town, with a grist mill, post office, company store, and free tenant homes for the workers of the paper mill. In 1914, a fire started in Harrisville and destroyed the entire town, leaving only ruins. Only the decayed ruins of this town exist today.

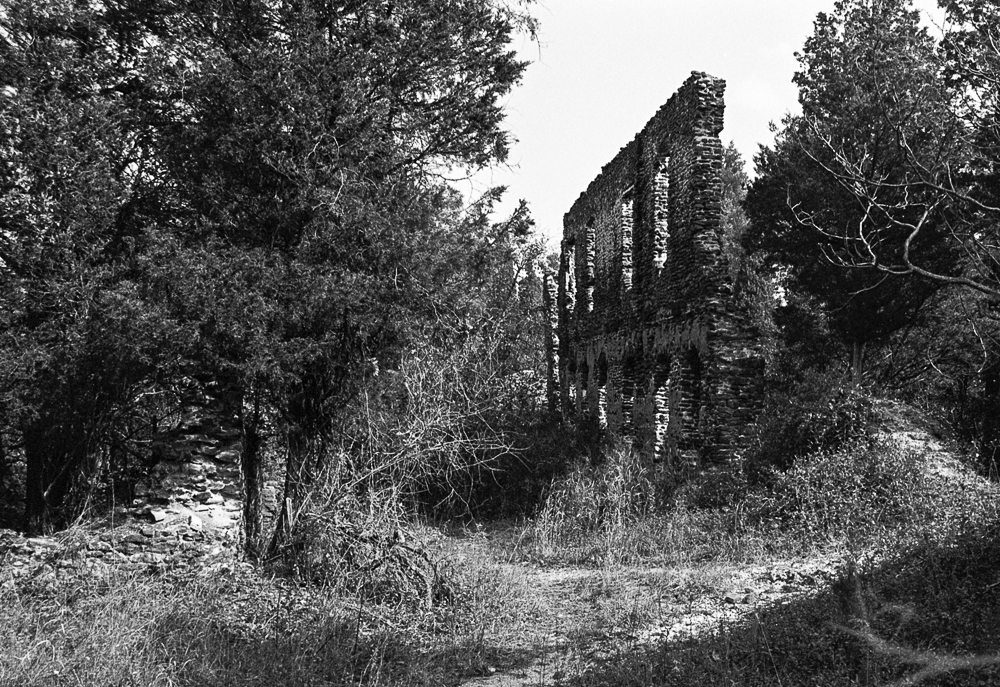
Remains of Harrisville, early 1970s

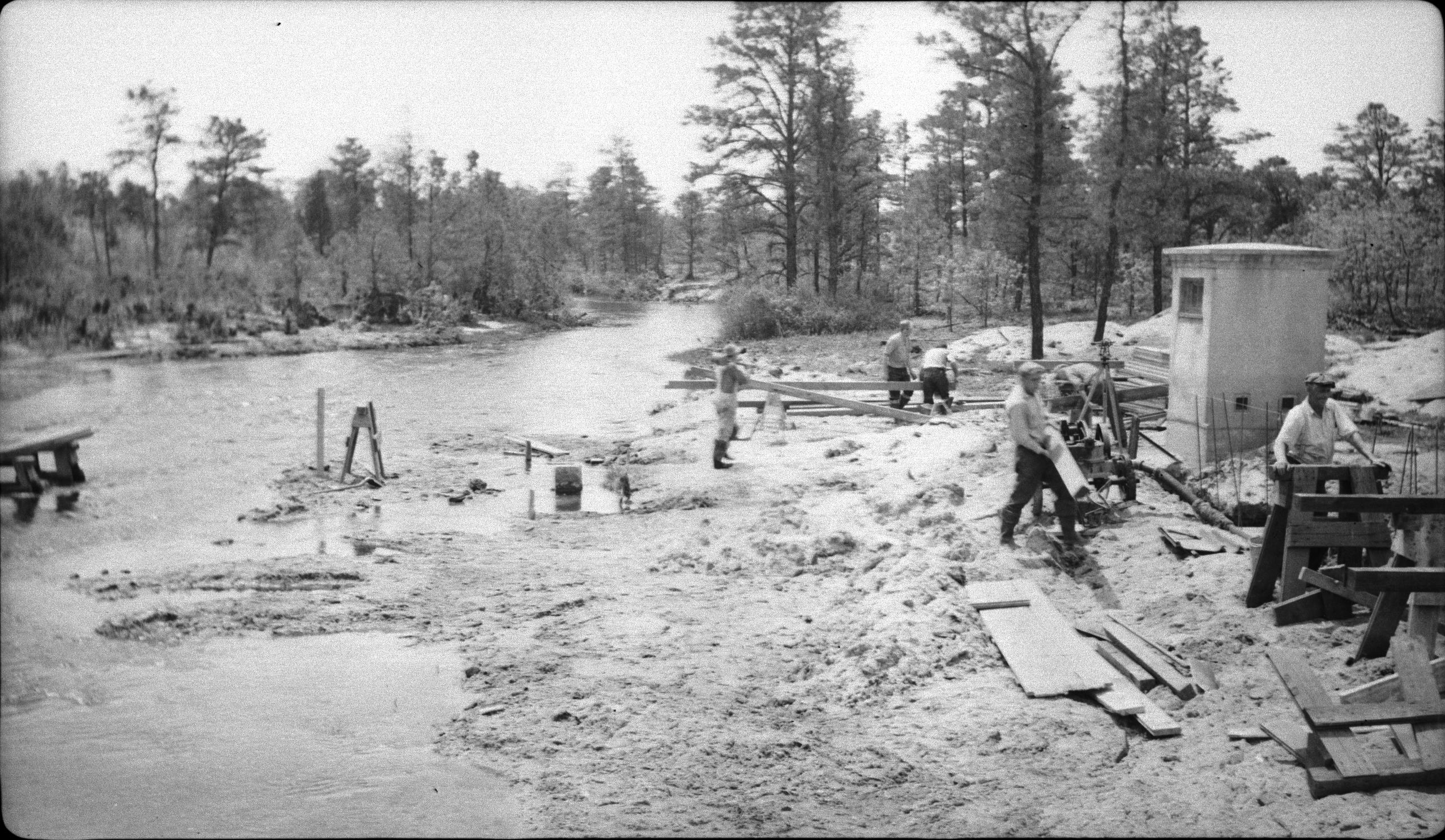
June 1939 WPA construction project on the Oswego River at the CR 679 overpass near Harrisville, just southwest of Harrisville Lake and Harrisville Dam

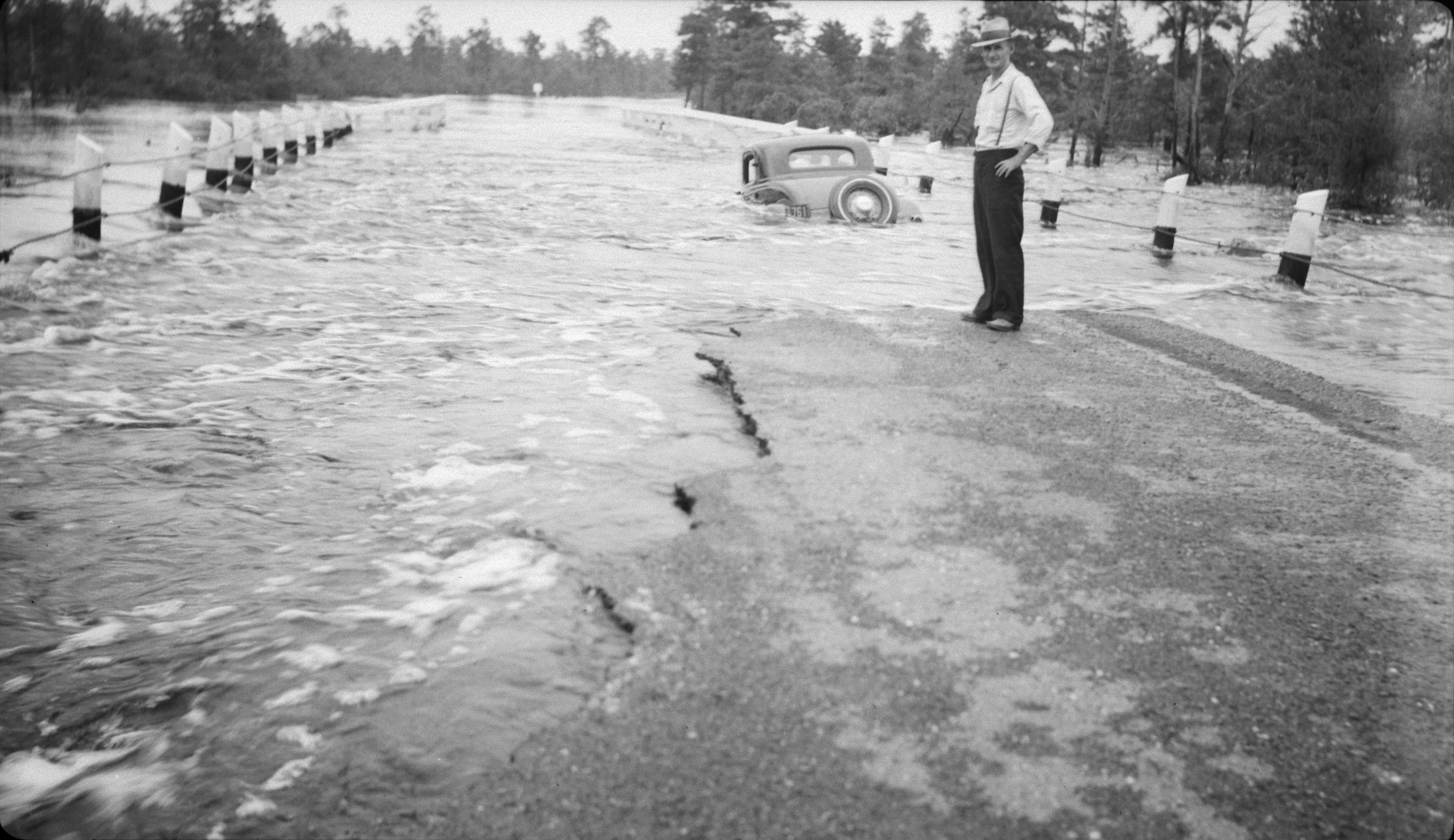
View of the August 20, 1939, Oswego River flood at Harrisville, as seen from where Chatsworth Road/County Route 679 crosses the river. The 1939 flood occurred despite the Harrisville Dam being in place since 1932.
