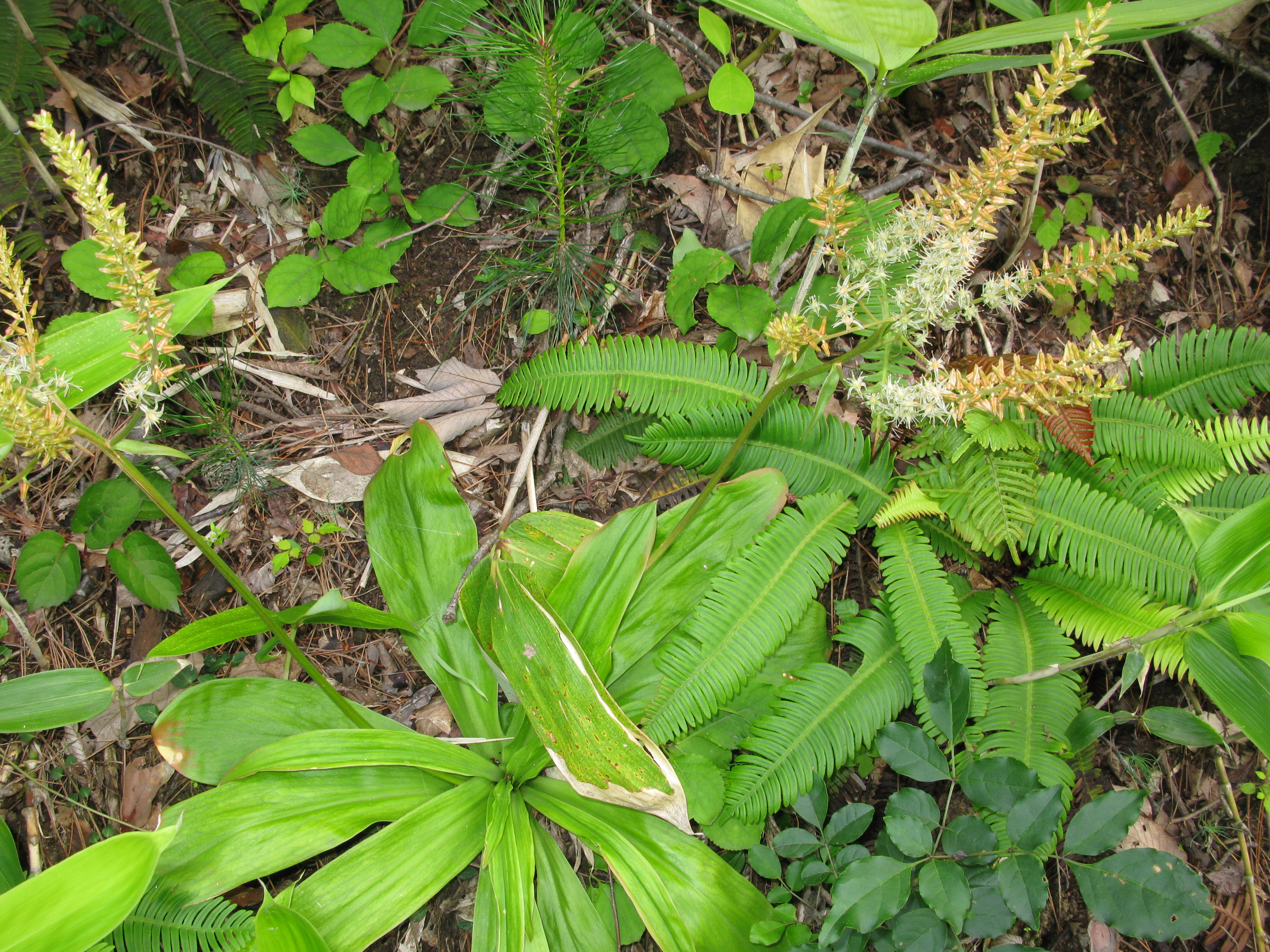
- Fukushima Prefecture, Japan

Scientific classification
- Kingdom: Plantae
- Clade: Tracheophytes
- Clade: Angiosperms
- Clade: Monocots
- Order: Dioscoreales
- Family: Nartheciaceae
- Genus: Metanarthecium; Maxim.
- Species: M. luteoviride

Binomial name
- Metanarthecium luteoviride Maxim.

Synonyms
- Metanarthecium luteo-viride common misspelling; Aletris luteoviridis (Maxim.) Franch; Metanarthecium yakumontanum Masam.; Metanarthecium luteoviride f. yakusimensis Masam.

= Metanarthecium =

Genus of flowering plants

Metanarthecium is a genus of monocotyledonous flowering plants native to eastern Asia. Its only known species is Metanarthecium luteoviride, known from Japan, Korea, and the Kuril Islands.

Two varieties are recognized:

- Metanarthecium luteoviride var. luteoviride - Japan, Korea, and the Kuril Islands
- Metanarthecium luteoviride var. nutans Masam. - Yakushima
