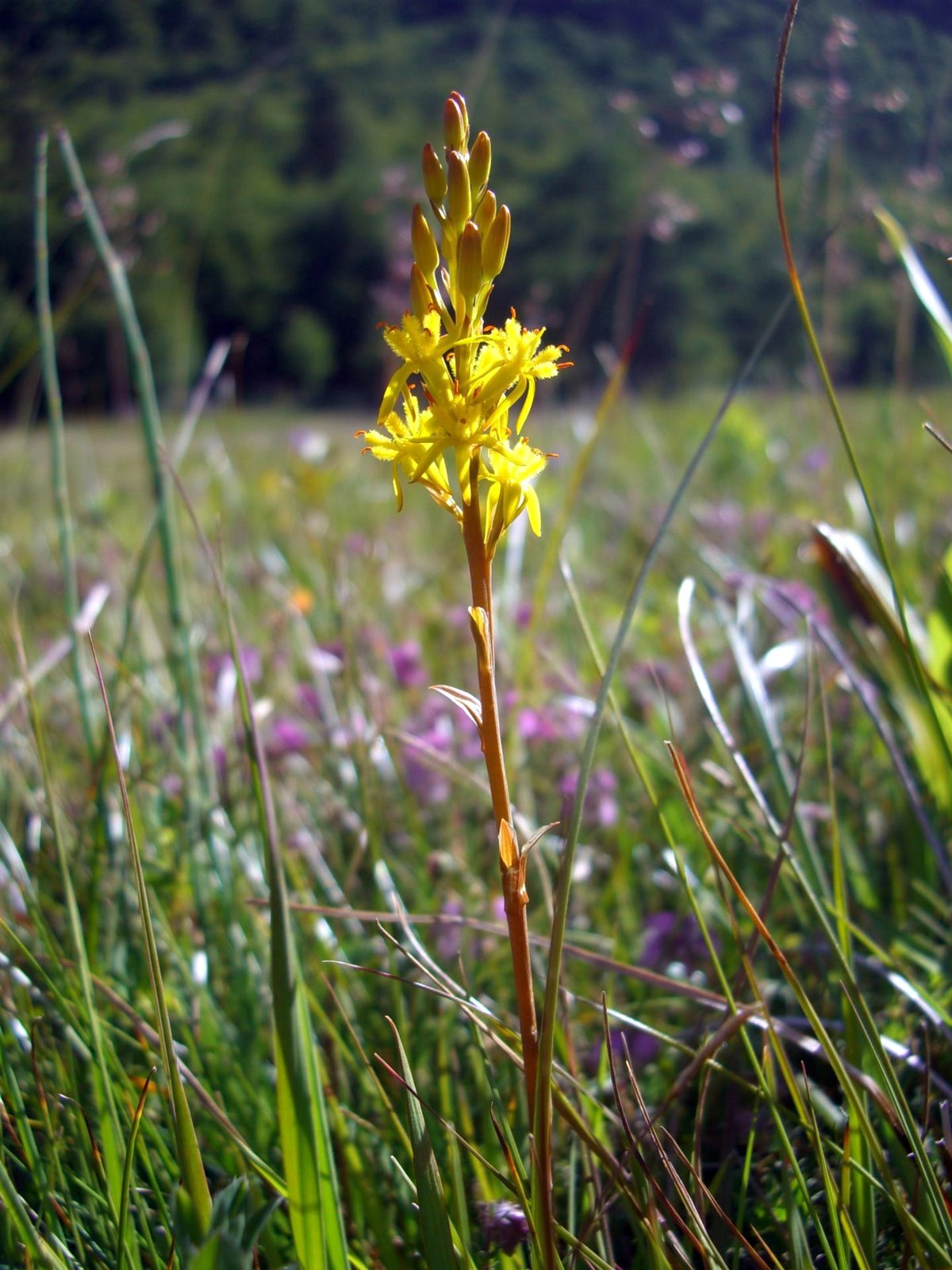
- Narthecium ossifragum

Scientific classification
- Kingdom: Plantae
- Clade: Tracheophytes
- Clade: Angiosperms
- Clade: Monocots
- Order: Dioscoreales
- Family: Nartheciaceae
- Genus: Narthecium; Huds.

Synonyms
- Abama Adans.

= Narthecium =

Genus of flowering plants

Narthecium is a Eurasian and North American genus of herbaceous flowering plants. This genus was traditionally treated as belonging to the family Liliaceae, but the APG II system of 2003 placed it in the family Nartheciaceae.

The global distribution of the genus is widely disjunct, with species in Europe, Southwest Asia, Japan, the East Coast of the United States, and the West Coast of the United States. Narthecium americanum was a candidate for listing under the federal Endangered Species Act in the United States.

Species

- Narthecium americanum Ker Gawl. – Eastern United States (†North and †South Carolina, Maryland, †Delaware, New Jersey)
- Narthecium asiaticum Maxim. – Japan
- Narthecium balansae Briq. – Turkey, Caucasus
- Narthecium californicum Baker – mountains of northern + central California, southwestern Oregon
- Narthecium ossifragum (L.) Huds. – Scandinavia (including Faeroe Islands), British Isles, France, Spain, Portugal, Germany, Netherlands, Belgium
- Narthecium reverchonii Celak. – Corsica
- Narthecium scardicum Košanin – Greece, Albania, Yugoslavia
