= Tulpehocken Creek (New Jersey) =

River in New Jersey, United States

Coordinates: 39.749566°N 74.590644°W

Tulpehocken Creek (lit. "land of the turtles") is a 7.7-mile-long (12.4 km) tributary of the Wading River in Burlington County in the southern New Jersey Pine Barrens in the United States.

The confluence of Tulpehocken Creek and the West Branch Wading River create the Wading River.

== See also ==
- Wharton State Forest
- List of rivers of New Jersey
