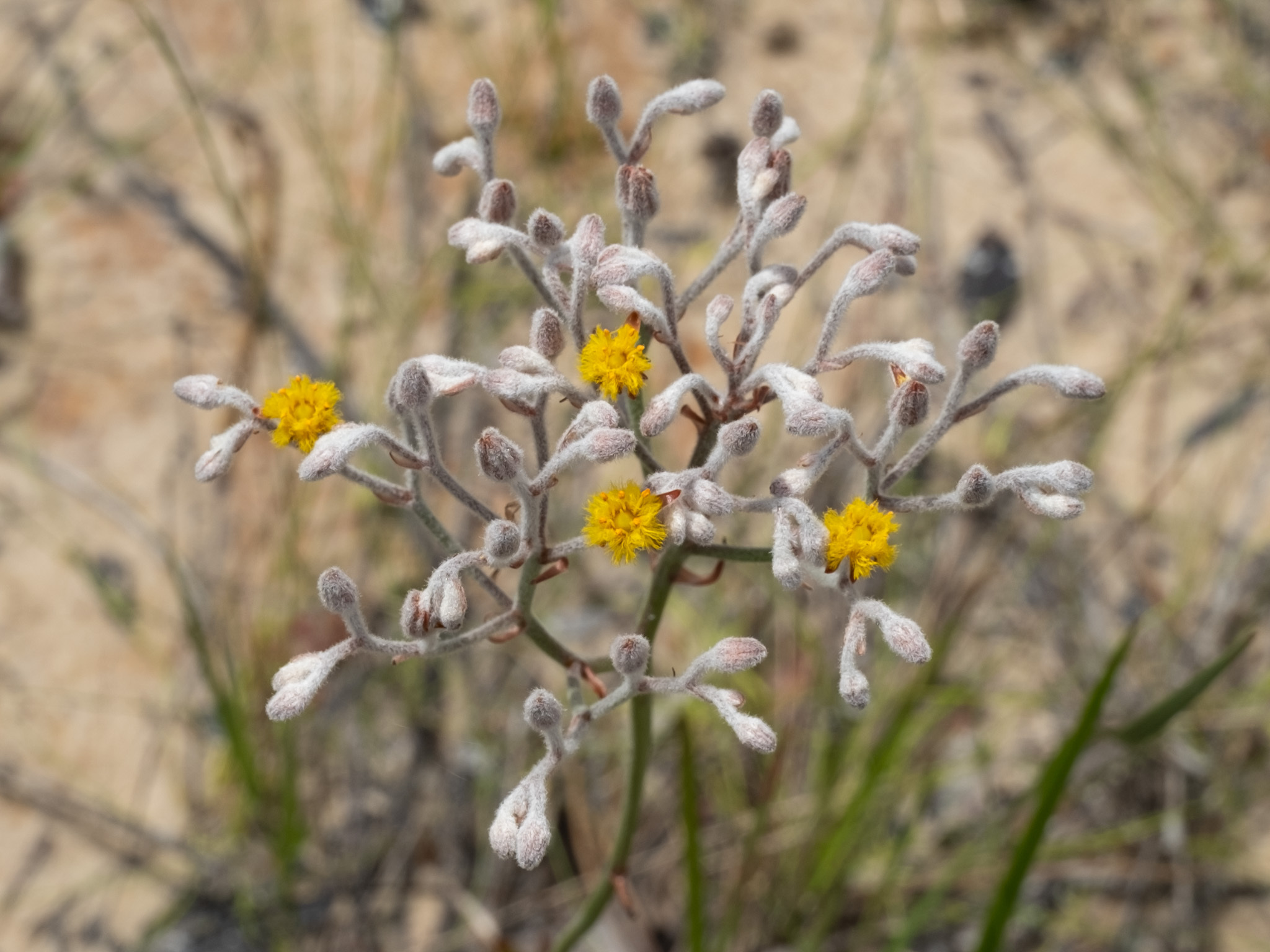
- L. aurea in Liberty County, FL, USA

Scientific classification
- Kingdom: Plantae
- Clade: Tracheophytes
- Clade: Angiosperms
- Clade: Monocots
- Order: Dioscoreales
- Family: Nartheciaceae
- Genus: Lophiola; Ker Gawl.
- Species: L. aurea

Binomial name
- Lophiola aurea Ker Gawl.

Synonyms
- Argolasia tomentosa Raf.; Lophiola tomentosa (Raf.) Britton, Sterns & Poggenb.; Conostylis americana Pursh; Helonias tomentosa Muhl. ex Schult. & Schult.f.; Lophiola americana (Pursh) A.Wood; Lophiola breviflora Gand.; Lophiola floridana Gand.; Lophiola septentrionalis Fernald

= Lophiola =

Golden-crest

Genus of flowering plants

Lophiola is a genus of monocotyledonous flowering plants native to eastern North America. It has variously been placed in the Liliaceae, the Haemodoraceae, the Tecophilaeaceae or the Nartheciaceae.

- Lophiola aurea Ker Gawl. - southeastern United States from Louisiana to North Carolina; also isolated populations in Delaware, New Jersey, and Nova Scotia

Fernald (1921) recommended recognizing three species, separating the Nova Scotia populations as L. septentrionalis and the New Jersey-Delaware material as L. americana. More recent investigations, however, have suggested that the group be regarded as one species.

Lophiola aurea is found in wet locations at elevations less than 100 m. It is a perennial herb up to 90 cm tall, spreading by means of underground rhizomes. It has yellow flowers about 10 mm across, and dry capsules about 4 mm in diameter. Goldencrest is a common name.
