= Wading River (New Jersey) =

River in New Jersey, United States

Coordinates: 39.619576°N 74.492439°W

The Wading River is a tributary of the Mullica River, approximately 10.1 miles (16.3 km) long, in southern New Jersey in the United States. The river drains a rural forested area of the Pinelands, one of the most pristine areas along the coast of the northeastern United States.

== Course ==
The primary source of the Wading River is its 22.7-mile-long (36.5 km) West Branch, which rises north of Chatsworth in central Burlington County, south of Brendan T. Byrne State Forest, and flows generally south through Wharton State Forest. It joins the Oswego River near Harrisville to form the main stem of the Wading River. The Wading flows southeast and joins the Mullica River from the north near its mouth, approximately 10 miles (16 km) north of Atlantic City. The lower 3 miles (5 km) of the river forms a navigable estuary, an arm of the estuary of the Mullica, just west of the Garden State Parkway.

Like the Mullica, the river is noted for its extensive wetlands, including large runs of striped bass.

== Tributaries ==
- Oswego River
- Tulpehocken Creek
- West Branch Wading River

== See also ==
- List of rivers of New Jersey
