= Oswego River (New Jersey) =

River in New Jersey, United States

Coordinates: 39.760246°N 74.42511°W

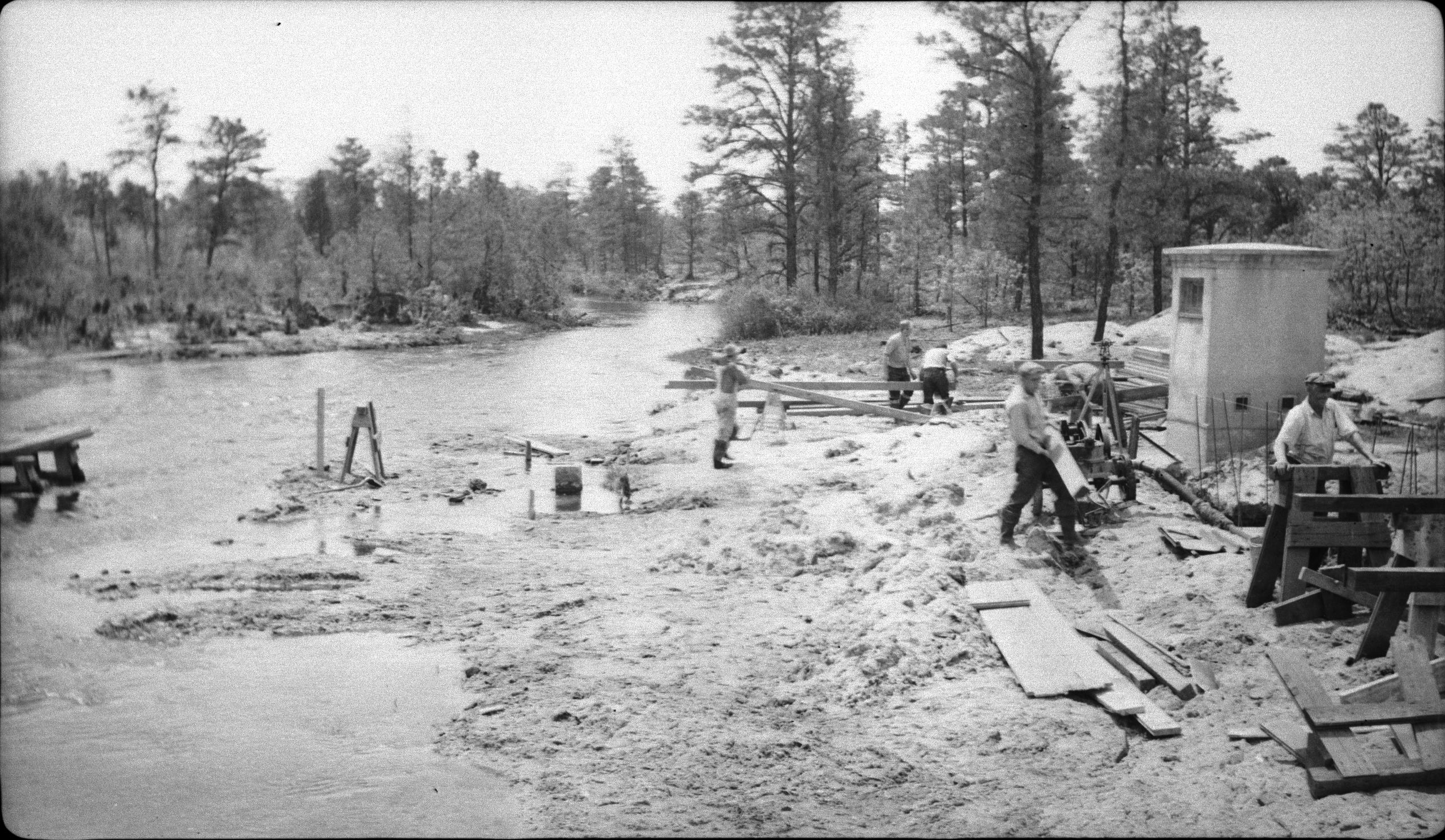
June 1939 WPA construction project on the Oswego River at the CR 679 overpass near Harrisville, New Jersey and just southwest of Harrisville Lake and Harrisville Dam.

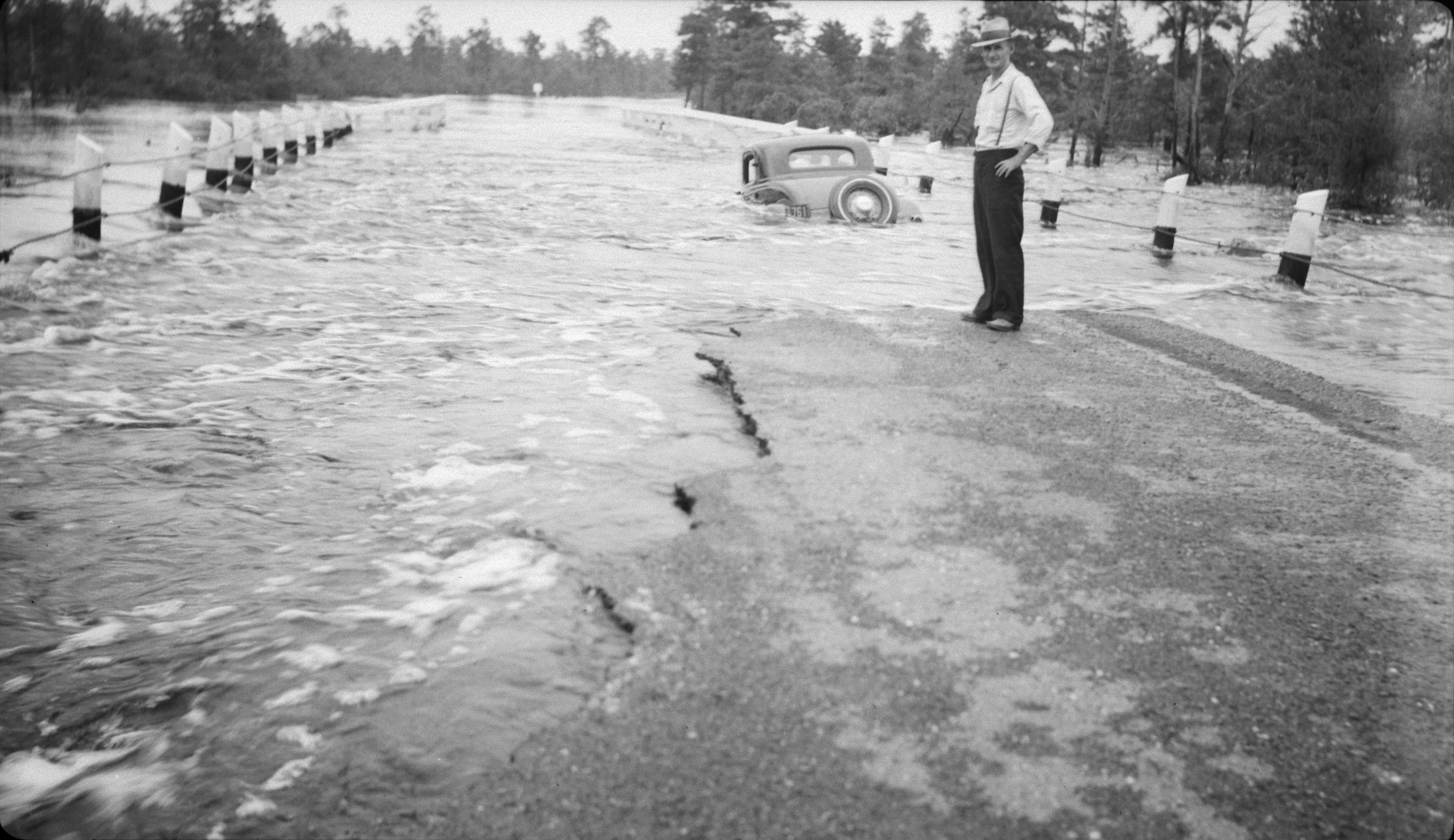
View of the August 20, 1939 Oswego River flood at Harrisville, New Jersey as seen from where Chatsworth Rd/County Route 679 crosses the Oswego River. The 1939 flood occurred despite the Harrisville Dam being in place since 1932.

The Oswego River is a 23.7-mile-long (38.1 km) tributary of the Wading River in the southern New Jersey Pine Barrens in the United States.

== See also ==
- List of rivers of New Jersey
