= Caboose (ship's galley) =

Kitchen on a ship

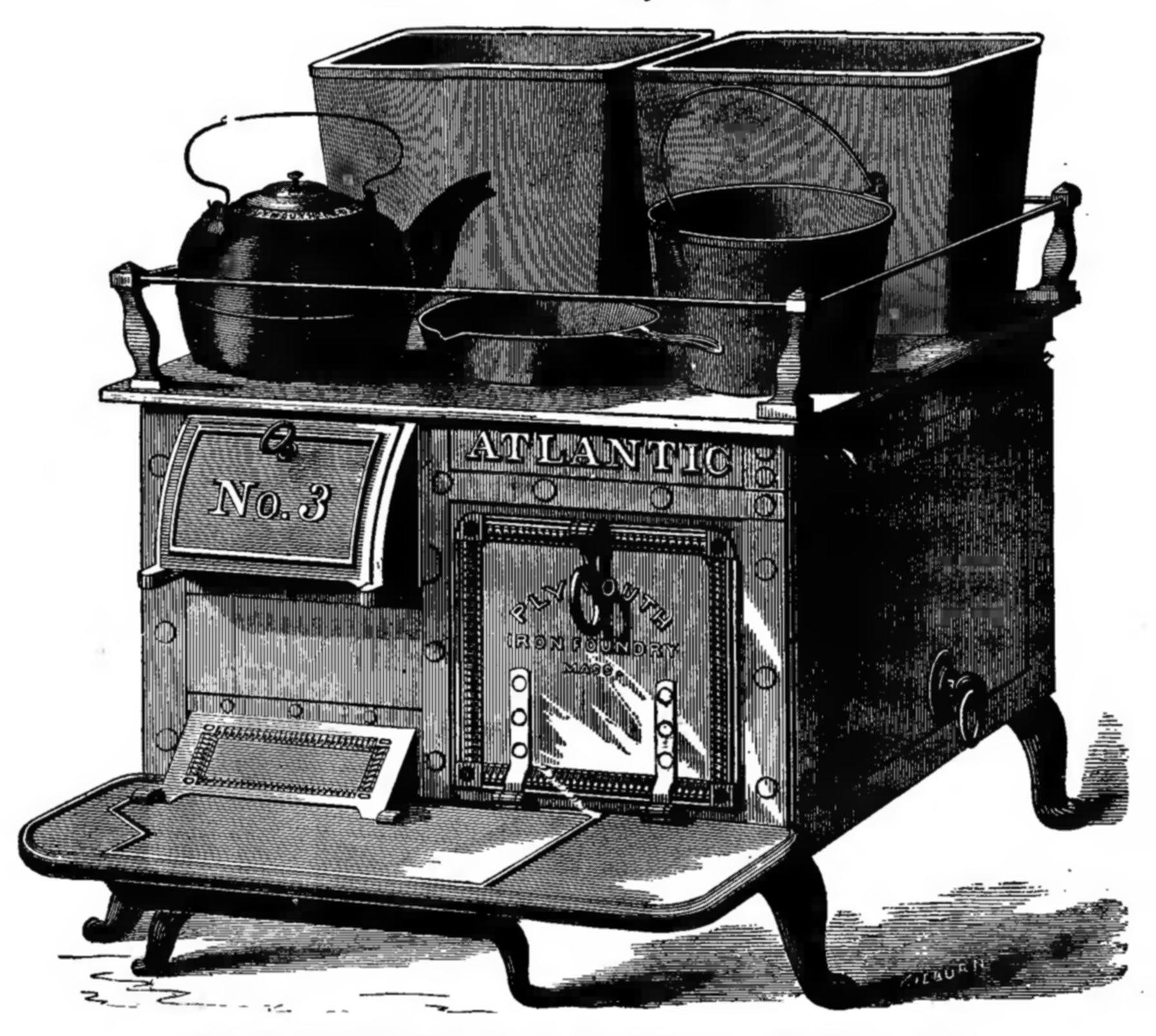
A caboose stove from an 1891 advertisement.

A caboose (also camboose, coboose, cubboos derived from the Middle Dutch kombuis) is a small ship's kitchen, or galley, located on an open deck.

At one time a small kitchen was called a caboose if aboard a merchantman (or in Canada, on a timber raft), but a galley aboard a warship. The term was sometimes also applied to the cast-iron stove used for cooking on deck or in galleys during the early 19th century, as well as an outdoor oven or fireplace.

William Falconer's 1780 A Universal Dictionary of the Marine describes a caboose thus: "a sort of box or house to cover the chimney of some merchant-ships. It somewhat resembles a sentry-box, and generally stands against the barricade on the fore part of the quarter-deck". Sometimes the caboose was portable. Prior to the introduction of the caboose the furnaces for cooking were, aboard three-deckers, placed on the middle deck, and aboard two-decked ships in the forecastle.
