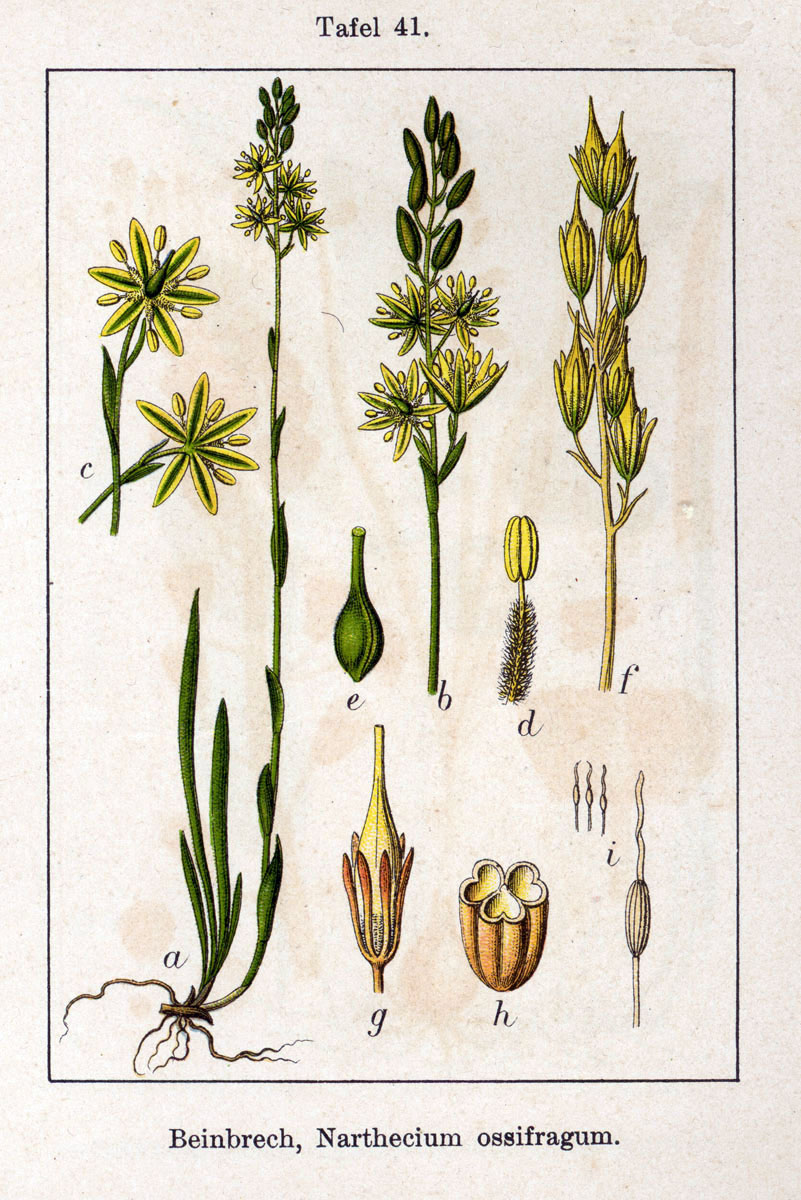
- Narthecium ossifragum 1796 illustration

Scientific classification
- Kingdom: Plantae
- Clade: Tracheophytes
- Clade: Angiosperms
- Clade: Monocots
- Order: Dioscoreales
- Family: Nartheciaceae; Fr. ex Bjurzon

Genera
- See text

= Nartheciaceae =

Family of flowering plants

Nartheciaceae is a family of flowering plants. The APG III system places it in the order Dioscoreales, in the clade monocots. As circumscribed by APG IV (2016) it includes 35 species of herbaceous plants in the following five genera:

- Aletris L.
- Lophiola Ker Gawl.
- Metanarthecium Maxim.
- Narthecium Huds.
- Nietneria Klotzsch ex Benth.

- Nartheciaceae
  - - - Narthecium
      - Nietneria
    - Lophiola
  - - Aletris
    - Metanarthecium
