= Pulaski =

Pulaski may refer to:

== Places ==
- Pulaski Heights, a section of the city of Little Rock, Arkansas
- Pulaski Shoal, an underwater landform west of the Florida Keys
- Pulaski, Georgia, a town
- Pulaski Square, one of the "Squares of Savannah" in the US state of Georgia
- Pulaski State Prison, a prison facility operated by the US State of Georgia
- Pulaski Tunnel, a historic site related to a 1910 forest fire in the northern panhandle of the U.S. state of Idaho
- Pulaski, Indiana, an unincorporated community
- Pulaski, Illinois, a village
- Pulaski Road (Chicago), major north-south street in the city of Chicago, Illinois, USA
- Mount Pulaski, Illinois
- Jasper-Pulaski Fish and Wildlife Area, a hunting & fishing wildlife area administered by the US state of Indiana
- Pulaski, Iowa
- Lake Pulaski, a lake in Minnesota
- Pulaski, Mississippi
- Pulaski, Missouri
- Pulaski, New York
- Pulaski, Ohio, a census-designated place
- Pulaskiville, Ohio, a census-designated place
- Pulaski, Tennessee
- Pulaski, Virginia
- Pulaski, Wisconsin, a village
- Pulaski, Iowa County, Wisconsin, a town

== American landmarks ==
- Pulaski Technical College, a college in Arkansas
- Fort Pulaski, on Cockspur Island, Georgia
- Pulaski Barracks, a U.S. Army military installation in Kaiserslautern, Germany

=== Ships ===
- SS Pułaski, an ocean liner for the Polish-owned Gdynia America Line
- USS Pulaski (1854)
- SS Pulaski, a steamship sunk off Cape Hatteras in 1838
- USCGC Pulaski (WSC-149), a patrol vessel built in 1927
- USS Casimir Pulaski (SSBN-633)
- USS Pulaski County (LST-1088)

== Transportation ==
=== Stations ===
- Pulaski station (CTA Orange Line)
- Pulaski station (CTA Blue Line)
- Pulaski station (CTA Green Line)
- Pulaski station (CTA Pink Line)

=== Roads ===
- Casimir Pulaski Memorial Highway, the portion of Interstate 65 in Lake County, Indiana
- County Route 11 (Suffolk County, New York) or Pulaski Road
- Pulaski Bridge, New York City
- Pulaski Expressway, a never-built expressway in Pennsylvania
- Pulaski Road (Chicago), Illinois
- Pulaski Skyway, New Jersey
- U.S. Route 40 in Delaware or Pulaski Highway
- U.S. Route 40 in Maryland or Pulaski Highway

== Other uses ==
- Pulaski (tool), a firefighting hand tool combining an ax and a mattock
- Pulaski (TV series), a 1987 BBC TV series
  - "Pulaski", a 1987 instrumental song by The Shadows and theme from the BBC TV series
- "Pulaski", a 2011 song by Drive-By Truckers from Go-Go Boots
- Pulaski Yankees, were a minor-league American baseball team based in Pulaski, Virginia

== People with the surname ==
- Casimir Pulaski, Polish soldier and nobleman, "the father of American cavalry"
- Ed Pulaski, U.S. Forest Service member
- Józef Pułaski, a Polish noble and joint creator of the Bar Confederation, father of Casimir

=== Fictional ===
- Apollo (DC Comics) or Andrew Pulaski, a comic book superhero
- Eddie Pulaski, a character in Grand Theft Auto: San Andreas
- Katherine Pulaski, a character in Star Trek: The Next Generation
- Ronette Pulaski, a character from the Twin Peaks TV series and movie

== See also ==
- Polaski, a surname
- Pulaski County (disambiguation)
- Pulaski Middle School (disambiguation)
- Pulaski Township (disambiguation)
- Pulaski Park (disambiguation), multiple locations
- Pulaskifield, Missouri, an unincorporated community
- Pulawski (disambiguation)
- ORP Generał Kazimierz Pułaski, a Polish Navy frigate
