= Polaski =

Polaski is a Polish language habitational surname and a variant of Pułaski for someone from a place called Pułazie in Podlaskie. Notable people with the name include:

- Deborah Polaski (1949), American opera and concert singer
- Frank Polaski (1904–1996), American politician

== See also ==
- Podlaski (disambiguation)
- Pulaski (disambiguation)
