= Pulaski Park =

Pulaski Park refers to a number of places named after Casimir Pulaski (Kazimierz Pułaski), a Polish military commander and American Revolutionary War hero.

== Parks in the United States ==
- Pulaski Park (Chicago)
- Pulaski Park (Holyoke, Massachusetts)
- Pulaski Park, Northampton, Massachusetts
- Pulaski Park, Fall River, Massachusetts, a Commemoration of Casimir Pulaski
- Pulaski State Park, Rhode Island
- Pulaski Park (Omaha)
- Pulaski Park, Pulaski, Virginia; see Canon de 155 mm GPF
- Fort Pulaski National Monument (National Park Service), an American Civil War military fort near Savannah, Georgia

== Neighborhoods in the United States ==
- Pulaski Park, Chicago, Illinois
- Pulaski (Gary), a park in Gary, Indiana

== See also ==
- Commemoration of Casimir Pulaski
- Pulaski Township (disambiguation)
