= Winiary, Warka =

District of the town of Warka, Poland

Winiary
- District of Warka
- Location within Poland
- Coordinates: 51°47′N 21°12′E
- Country: Poland
- Voivodeship: Greater Poland
- County: Grójec
- Gmina: Warka
- Town: Warka
- Within city limits: 1930
- Time zone: UTC+1 (CET)
  - Summer (DST): UTC+2 (CEST)
- Vehicle registration: WGR

Winiary [viˈɲarɨ] is a district of Warka, Poland, located in the north-eastern part of the town.

== History ==
In 1827 Winiary had a population of 299. It was included within the town limits of Warka in 1930.

== Notable people ==
- Kazimierz Pułaski (1745–1779), Polish military commander and national hero, who was active during the American Revolutionary War as a general, spent his childhood in Winiary
- Piotr Wysocki (1797–1875), Polish colonel, who started the November Uprising, born in Winiary
