= Noho Pride =

LGBT event in Northampton, Massachusetts, United States

Noho Pride was an annual LGBT pride event, consisting of a parade and a rally, held in Northampton, Massachusetts in early May. It was first held in 1982, and then every year afterwards until 2020.

== 1982-1988 ==
Noho Pride started as the Northampton Lesbian and Gay Liberation March, which was first held in May 1982. The march was organized in response to harassment that LGBTQ residents were facing and to legislation which denied money to groups that "promoted homosexuality". The march was organized by the Gay and Lesbian Activists (GALA), who consisted of local residents. Marchers walked from the Bridge Street School to Pulaski Park. They faced backlash, with marchers having eggs thrown at them from windows and by passersby. Educators who joined the march wore paper bags over their heads to disguise their identities, as they could be fired if their employers knew they were gay. In 1983 an estimated 1-2,000 people were expected to attend.

In 1984 GALA was denied a permit by the city, and they filed a lawsuit in response. The Hampshire Superior Court threw out the city's parade ordinance. The 1985 march was attended by about 1,500 people.

== 1989-1999 ==
In early 1989 conflicts arose after the event's name was changed to the Lesbian, Gay, and Bisexual March (although bisexuals had been included since at least 1986). Lesbian activists feared the inclusion of bisexuality would lead to the decentering or exclusion of lesbian speakers and activism. The name was changed back in 1990, but disagreements continued on the extent to which bisexuality should be included in the event, with some bisexual individuals boycotting the march. The event's name was again changed to the Lesbian, Gay, and Bisexual Pride March in 1992. In 1993 the name was again expanded to the Lesbian, Gay, Bisexual, and Transgender Pride March.

== 2000-2020 ==
By 2000, the event's planning committee was named Northampton Pride March, Inc. In 2004 an estimated 10,000 people turned up to the event to celebrate the legalization of same-sex marriage in Massachusetts.

2011 marked the event's 30th anniversary, during which Robyn Ochs served as the event's first openly bisexual grand marshal. One group, the Queer Insurgency Collective, protested the supposed commercialization, racially homogenous, and apolitical nature of the event.

As of 2014, the event cost an estimated $30,000 to put on.

An estimated 30,000 people attended the event in 2017.

In 2019 the event drew between 30,000 and 35,000 people. In 2020 the event was cancelled due to the COVID-19 pandemic, but a virtual 'parade' was still held. During the following years the event struggled to reorganize, and in 2023 the event was replaced by Hampshire Pride.
