= Pulawski =

Pulawski can refer to:

== People ==
- Kazimierz Pulawski (1745–1779), Polish nobleman, soldier and military commander
- Zygmunt Puławski (1901–1931), Polish aircraft designer, pilot

== Places ==
- Pulawski Township, Michigan, United States
- Puławski or Puławy County, Poland

== See also ==
- Pulaski (disambiguation)
