= The General Was Female? =

- America's Hidden Stories episode
- Episode no.: Season 1 Episode 6
- Original air date: April 8, 2019
- Running time: 50 minutes

"The General Was Female?" is the sixth episode in the documentary series America's Hidden Stories that argues that Revolutionary War General Casimir Pulaski was intersex. It first aired on Smithsonian Channel on April 8, 2019.

== See also ==
- Intersex people in the United States military
