= Knight of Freedom Award =

Polish international award

- Awarded for: Actions in support of human rights and democracy
- Country: Poland
- Presented by: Casimir Pulaski Foundation
- First award: 2005
- Website: pulaski.pl/en/knight-of-freedom-award/

The Knight of Freedom Award (Polish: Rycerz Wolności) is a Polish international award conferred annually to "outstanding figures, who promote the values represented by General Casimir Pulaski: freedom, justice, and democracy".

== History ==
The award was established in 2005 and is presented by the Casimir Pulaski Foundation. Zbigniew Pisarski, the president of the Casimir Pulaski Foundation, presents the laureates with handmade replicas of the sabre (Polish: karabela) used by General Pulaski. The award ceremony takes place each year during the Warsaw Security Forum.

== Laureates ==
Year	Laureate(s)	Image	Citizenship(s)	Description	Source(s)
2025	Jens Stoltenberg	JensStoltenberg	Norway		
2023	NATO	NATO	International	The award was accepted by Jens Stoltenberg, secretary general of NATO.	
2022	Ukraine	Olena Zelenska	Ukraine	The award was accepted by Olena Zelenska, the first lady of Ukraine.	
2021	Alexei Navalny	Alexei Navalny	Russia		
2020	Thorbjørn Jagland	Thorbjørn Jagland	Norway		
2019	Dalia Grybauskaitė	Dalia Grybauskaitė	Lithuania		
2018	Anders Fogh Rasmussen	Anders Fogh Rasmussen	Denmark		
2017	Mary Robinson	Mary Robinson	Ireland		
2016	Toomas Ilves	Toomas Ilves	Estonia		
2016	Mikhail Khodorkovsky	Mikhail Khodorkovsky	Russia		
2015	Carl Bildt	Carl Bildt	Sweden		
2015	Radosław Sikorski	Radosław Sikorski	Poland		
2014	Mikheil Saakashvili	Mikheil Saakashvili	Georgia		
2013	Vaira Vīķe-Freiberga	Vaira Vīķe-Freiberga	Latvia		
2012	Richard Lugar	Richard Lugar	United States		
2011	Bernard Kouchner	Bernard Kouchner	France		
2010	Javier Solana	Javier Solana	Spain		
2009	Valdas Adamkus	Valdas Adamkus	Lithuania		
2009	Aleksander Kwaśniewski	Aleksander Kwaśniewski	Poland		
2008	Lech Wałęsa	Lech Wałęsa	Poland		
2007	Alaksandar Milinkievič	Alaksandar Milinkievič	Belarus		
2006	Władysław Bartoszewski	Władysław Bartoszewski	Poland	for his work in the Solidarity trade union and in Polish-German relations	
2005	Norman Davies	Norman Davies	United Kingdom		

== See also ==
- Solidarity Prize
- Sakharov Prize
