= Pulaski Middle School =

Pulaski Middle School may refer to a number of middle schools including:

- Dunbar-Pulaski Middle School, Gary, Indiana, part of Gary Community School Corporation
- Pulaski Middle School, New Britain, Connecticut, part of New Britain School District
- Pulaski Middle School, Pulaski, Virginia, part of Pulaski County Public Schools

== See also ==
- Pulaski (disambiguation)
- Pulaski High School
