= Pułaski =

Polish noble family

Pułaski (Polish: Pułascy) family was a Polish noble family of the Ślepowron coat of arms. Its most famous member was Casimir Pulaski.

Many of the family members were supporters of the Bar Confederation in the late 18th century.

== Members ==
- Antoni Pułaski (1747–1813) deputy, Bar Confederate
- Franciszek Jan Pułaski (1875–1956) historian, diplomat
- Franciszek Pułaski (zm. 1769), Bar Confederate
- Franciszek Ksawery Pułaski (1743–1769) starost, Bar Confederate
- Józef Pułaski (1704–1769) starost, deputy, Bar Confederate
- Casimir Pulaski (1746–1779), Bar Confederate, officer in the American War of Independence, national hero of Poland and the USA
- Kazimierz Ferdynand Pułaski (1846–1926) landowner, historian
