= Bust of Piotr Wysocki =

Monument in Warsaw, Poland

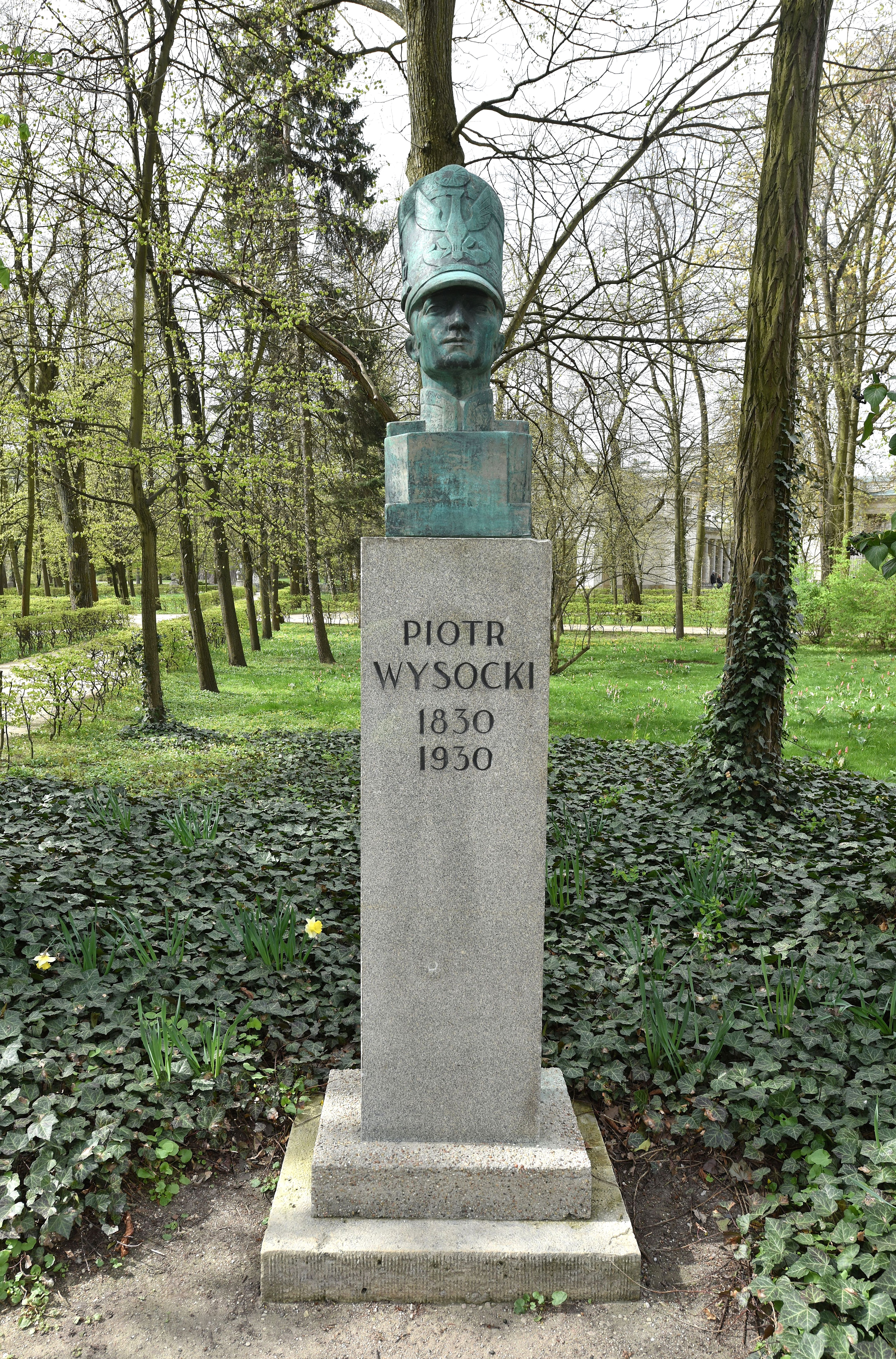
- The monument in 2017.
- Interactive map of Bust of Piotr Wysocki
- Location: Royal Baths Park, Downtown, Warsaw, Poland
- Coordinates: 52°12′55.49″N 21°02′15.02″E
- Designer: Aleksander Żurakowski
- Type: Bust
- Material: Bronze (sculpture); granite (pedestal)
- Completion date: 1926
- Opening date: 1930 (original location); 29 November 1980 (current location)
- Dedicated to: Piotr Wysocki

The bust of Piotr Wysocki (Polish pronunciation: [ˈpjɔtr vɘ̟ˈsɔt͡s.ki]; Polish: Popiersie Piotra Wysockiego) also known as the Piotr Wysocki Memorial (Polish: Pomnik Piotra Wysockiego) is a monument in the city of Warsaw, Poland. It is located in the Royal Baths Park, within the Downtown district. It is dedicated to Piotr Wysocki, a 19th-century military officer, a colonel in the Army of Congress Poland, and one of the organisers and commanders of the November Uprising of 1830. The monument has the form of a bronze bust statue placed on top of a granite pedestal. It was made in 1926 by Aleksander Żurakowski, and unveiled in 1930 in the town of Ostrów Mazowiecka. It remained there until the outbreak of the Second World War, when it disappeared. The sculpture was rediscovered in 1978, and placed in the Na Książęcem Park, from where it was relocated to its current location in 1980.

== History ==
The bust was sculpted in 1926 by Aleksander Żurakowski to commemorate Piotr Wysocki, a 19th-century military officer, a colonel in the Army of Congress Poland, and one of the organisers and commanders of the November Uprising of 1830. It was unveiled in 1930, and placed outside the barracks of the Infantry Officer Candidate School in the town of Ostrów Mazowiecka.

The sculpture disappeared during the Second World War. The search after it was organised by the military and its author Aleksander Żurakowski, then a head conservator-restorer of Warsaw. The sculpture was found in 1978, bricked up in one of grottoes in the Na Książęcem Park in Warsaw, near the back of the National Museum in Warsaw. It was discovered by Marek Kwiatkowski, the curator of the Royal Baths Park, while he explored the grotto together with a television crew. The sculpture was given to the museum, and placed in the southern portion of the Na Książęcem Park. The sculpture was later relocated to the Royal Baths Park, being unveiled on 29 November 1980, which marked the 150th anniversary of the begging of the November Uprising. It was placed next to the building of the Warsaw Officer Candidate School, where Wysocki used to teach in, and where he began the uprising with his students.

== Characteristics ==
The monument is placed in the Royal Baths Park, near the building of the Warsaw Officer Candidate School. It consists of a bronze bust sculpture of Piotr Wysocki, wearing a military uniform of the Army of Congress Poland, with a tall rogatywka hat, featuring a large emblem of a military eagle. Its placed on top of a granite pedestal, which features the inscription which reads: "Piotr Wysocki; 1830; 1930", written in capitalised letters. The dates mark the beginning of the November Uprising and the unveiling of the monument on its 100th anniversary.
