= USS Pulaski County =

Tank landing ship of the U.S. Navy

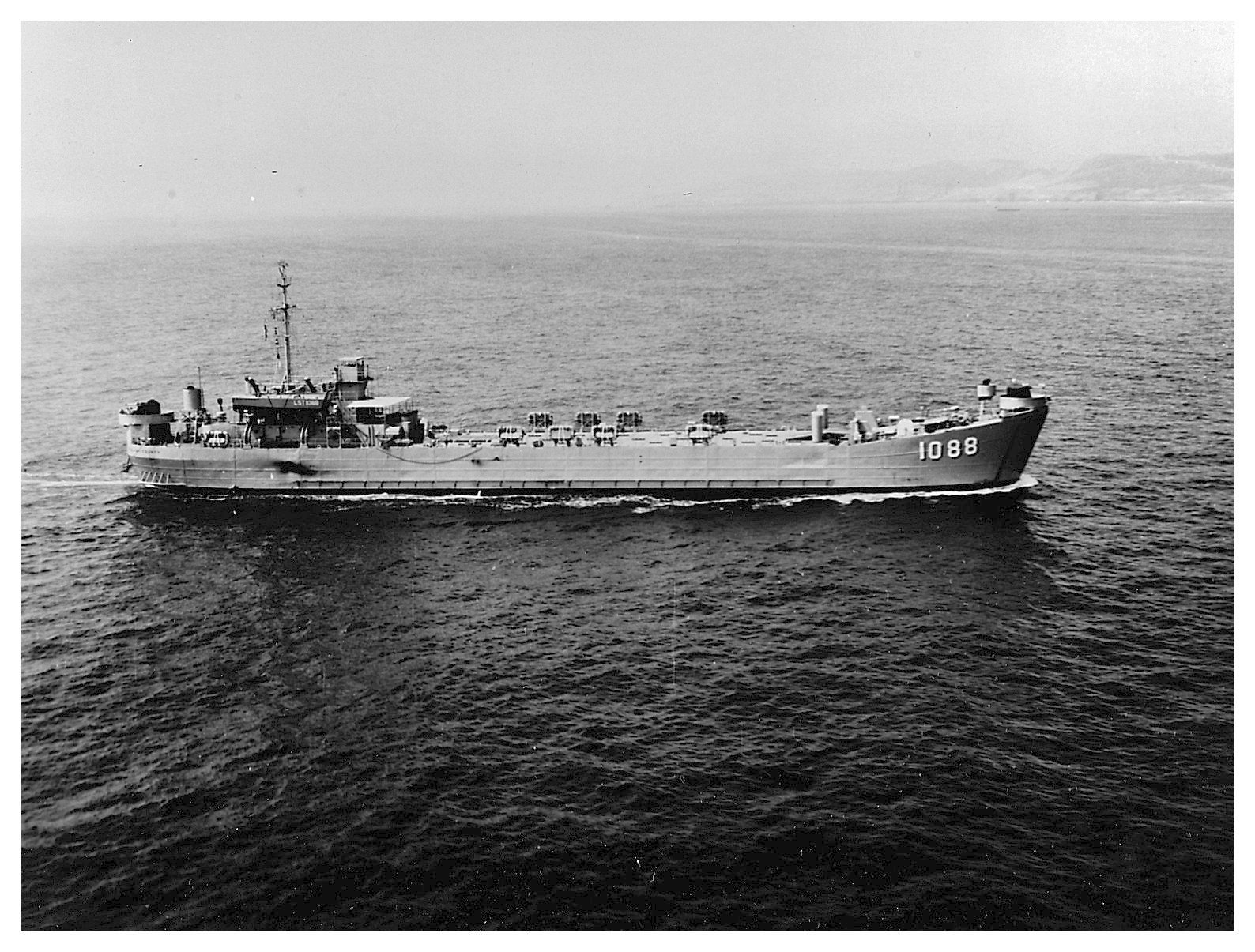
- USS Pulaski County (LST-1088), underway, date and location unknown.

History

United States
- Name: LST-1088
- Builder: American Bridge Company, Ambridge, Pennsylvania
- Laid down: 16 December 1944
- Launched: 11 February 1945
- Commissioned: 27 March 1945
- Decommissioned: 29 August 1946
- Renamed: Pulaski County (LST-1088), 1 July 1955
- Recommissioned: 21 May 1963
- Decommissioned: July 1967
- In service: July 1967, as USNS Pulaski County (T-LST-1088)
- Out of service: Unknown
- Stricken: 1 November 1973
- Motto: Navis Septem Givitatum
- Honors and awards: 2 battle stars (Vietnam)
- Fate: Sold for scrapping, 1 January 1975, to Abdul Sattar Chbib, of Midea GmbH in Frankfurt, w/Germany.

General characteristics
- Class & type: LST-1081-class tank landing ship
- Displacement: 4,080 long tons (4,145 t) full
- Length: 328 ft (100 m)
- Beam: 50 ft (15 m)
- Draft: 14 ft (4.3 m) aft
- Propulsion: 2 × General Motors 12-567 diesel engines, two shafts, twin rudders
- Speed: 12 knots (22 km/h; 14 mph)
- Boats & landing craft carried: 2 × LCVPs
- Troops: Approximately 130 officers and enlisted men
- Complement: 8–10 officers, 89–100 enlisted
- Armament: 1 × single 3"/50 caliber gun mount; 8 × 40 mm guns; 12 × 20 mm guns

USS Pulaski County (LST-1088) was a LST-1081-class tank landing ship of the United States Navy, named for seven counties in the United States.

== Construction ==
LST-1088 was laid down by the American Bridge Company of Ambridge, Pennsylvania, on 16 December 1944. The ship was launched on 11 February 1945, sponsored by Mrs. A. J. Paddock; and commissioned at Algiers, Louisiana, on 27 March 1945.

== Service history ==
=== World War II, 1945–1946 ===
After shakedown off Florida, LST-1088 departed the Gulf Coast on 6 May for the Pacific. She put into Pearl Harbor, Eniwetok, Guam, Saipan, Manila, and Lingayen Gulf before landing occupation troops at Wakayama, Honshu, Japan on 28 October. She subsequently carried troops and cargo to Okinawa, Sasebo, Saipan, Pearl Harbor, and San Francisco, arriving there on 19 January 1946. In March she sailed for Portland, Oregon where she underwent pre-inactivation overhaul, was decommissioned on 29 August 1946, and berthed with the Columbia River Group, Pacific Reserve Fleet.

On 1 July 1955, LST-1088 was named USS Pulaski County (LST-1088). In 1961 Pulaski County was moved to the Reserve Group at Bremerton, Washington.

=== 1963–1967 ===
On 21 May 1963, she recommissioned and was assigned to Reserve LST Squadron 2 homeported in Little Creek, Virginia. The ship underwent refresher training at San Diego from 17 June to 2 July, then sailed on 20 July via the Panama Canal for Little Creek, arriving on 22 August.

In January and February 1964, Pulaski County transported obsolete ammunition from the Naval Ammunition Depot Earle, Monmouth County, New Jersey, for disposal at sea. She then operated along the east coast from Florida to New York, and provided training services for the Army at Little Creek. In late February 1965 Pulaski County supported a Project Gemini space flight. From 22 May through 25 August she supported Army troops during the Dominican Republic operations.

In early 1966 Pulaski County deployed from Little Creek to the Pacific via the Panama Canal. She spent most of the year in the western Pacific, particularly in South Vietnam, but also making port calls at Okinawa, The Philippines, Hong Kong and Sasebo, Japan. Her main duty was transporting cargo to Vietnam. She continued to operate in Vietnam and the Far East in early 1967. LST 1088 served in the Mekong Delta giving supplies to various stops including posts at Cần Thơ, Mỹ Tho, Nha Trang, Vung Tau, and Da Nang as well as support for PBRs on the river. In July 1967 she was transferred to Military Sea Transportation Service (MSTS), and was redesignated USNS Pulaski County (T-LST-1088). She served with MSTS into 1970.

== Disposal ==
Struck from the Navy List on 1 November 1973, Pulaski County was sold for scrapping on 1 January 1975 by the Defense Reutilization and Marketing Service.

== Awards ==
Pulaski County earned two battle stars for Vietnam War service.
