= Katarzyna Pisarska =

Polish social entrepreneur, civic activist and academic

Katarzyna Emanuela Pisarska (born 23 May 1981) is a Polish social entrepreneur, civic activist and academic, specializing in foreign and security policy.

Pisarska is the Founder and Chairwoman of the European Academy of Diplomacy (2004) as well as Co-Founder of the Casimir Pulaski Foundation (2005) and its flagship event - the Warsaw Security Forum (2014). Katarzyna Pisarska is also a professor at the Warsaw School of Economics. and - since 2024 - Head of the Advisory Council to the Chair of the Foreign Affairs Committee of the Polish Parliament.

In 2022 - together with a group of Ukrainian NGO activists - she has helped create the International Center for Ukrainian Victory. For her work, in 2025 Prof. Pisarska has received the Order of Merit from the President of Ukraine.

In 2025 Pisarska was a co-screenwriter and main protagonist of the international documentary series "Dancing with the Russian Bear".

She is the daughter of Prof. Marek L. Kowalski and Prof. Mariola Śliwińska-Kowalska. She is also the wife of Polish entrepreneur Zbigniew Pisarski.

== Education and academic career ==
Pisarska is a graduate of the University of Łódź (1998-2003), Warsaw School of Economics (2001-2003) and the College of Europe (2003-2004), having received MA degrees in International Relations and European Integration. In 2009 she obtained a PhD in economics at the Warsaw School of Economics and in 2018 earned a post-doctoral degree (habilitacja) in political science at the Faculty of International and Political Studies of the University of Łódź.

Katarzyna Pisarska is an associate professor at the Warsaw School of Economics. She specializes in EU foreign policy, EU-Russia relations, Eastern Partnership, as well as public diplomacy. Pisarska's research focuses on the role of civil society in the realization of foreign policy goals. She is the author of the book "The Domestic Dimension of Public Diplomacy - Evaluating Success through Civil Engagement" (Palgrave 2016).

Previously, Pisarska was a Fulbright Visiting Fellow at Harvard University (2007), a Visiting Scholar at Johns Hopkins University's School of Advanced International Studies (2010), at the University of Oslo (2012) at the Australian National University (2015) at the University of Southern California (2019) and at the University of Malaga (2022/2023).

Pisarska has completed executive leadership courses at the Harvard Kennedy School (2016), the Saïd Business School at the Oxford University (2017) and a module devoted to sustainable environmental policies at Princeton University (2018).

== Social and public engagement ==
Pisarska was one of the co-founders and later President (2004-2008) of the Polish Forum of Young Diplomats. In 2004 she had established the first non-governmental diplomatic academy in Europe: the European Academy of Diplomacy. In 2013, in partnership with the Council of Europe, she created a regional leadership school: the Visegrad School of Political Studies.

Pisarska is also the co-founder and Chairwomen of the Council of the Casimir Pulaski Foundation in Poland (2005), as well as the Chair of the Warsaw Security Forum (2014).

In the years 2020-2024 she was the Vice-President of European Forum Alpbach in Austria and since 2024 is a Member of EFA's International Advisory Board.

In 2022 - together with a group of Ukrainian NGO activists - she has helped create the International Center for Ukrainian Victory.

== Documentary series "Dancing with the Russian Bear" ==
In 2025 Pisarska was featured, as the main protagonist, in an international documentary series looking at the global security crisis unfolding after the Russian full scale invasion of Ukraine. The "Dancing with the Russian Bear" is a 6-episode document produced by TVP World, revealing the insights behind closed doors of power.

== Awards and recognitions ==
- Order of Merit (Ukraine), III Degree (2025)
- Munich Young Leader (2020/2021), Munich Security Conference.
- Young Global Leader (2014), World Economic Forum, Member of the YGL Advisory Council (since 2018)
- The NAWA Bekker Program Award for Most Outstanding Polish Scholars (2018).
- VIP Alumni of the University of Łódź Award (2016)
- "99 under the age of 33 most influential world foreign policy leaders", Diplomatic Courier, Washington D.C. (2013).
- Fulbright Research Fellowship at Harvard University (2007)

== Bibliography ==
=== Books ===
- K. Pisarska (2016), The Domestic Dimension of Public Diplomacy – Evaluating Success through Civil Engagement, London: Palgrave McMillan.
- K. Pisarska (2003), The Polish American community's lobbying for Poland's inclusion into NATO, Wydawnictwo Mediton, Łódź

=== Selected articles ===
- K. Pisarska, González Laya A., Grand C., Tocci N., Wolff G. (2025), Can American Abandonment Help Europe? The Continent Has a Chance to Address Its Own Weaknesses, Foreign Affairs
- K. Pisarska, K. (2025). Behind the U.S. Foreign Policy Decision-Making to Invade Iraq (2003): Insider Accounts Two Decades On. Diplomacy & Statecraft, 36(1), 250–268.
- K. Pisarska, González Laya A., Grand C., Tocci N., Wolff G. (2024), Trump-Proofing Europe: How the Continent Can Prepare for American Abandonment, Foreign Affairs.
- K. Pisarska (2024), The Jury Is In? The Impact of Domestic and Global Responses to The COVID Health Crisis On Soft Power of The United States, China, and Germany (2020–2021), W: The Routledge Handbook of Soft Power/ red. Chitty N., Lilian Ji, G. D. Rawnsley.
- K. Pisarska (2023), US–French relations in the run-up to the US invasion of Iraq (2002–2003): Insider accounts two decades on, Sprawy Międzynarodowe.
- K. Pisarska (2021), Soft power in times of the plague: the winners and losers of first wave of COVID-19 (winter-summer 2020), Sprawy Międzynarodowe, 73 (3) pp. 41-67.
- K. Pisarska (2019), Strengthening European Defense Capabilities: A Polish Perspective, Georgetown Journal of International Affairs.
- K. Pisarska (2019), Why Europe's Elections Matter in Poland, The Atlantic Council.
- K. Pisarska (2019), Conducting Elite Interviews in an International Context: Lessons From the World of Public Diplomacy, SAGE Research Methods Cases Part 2.
- K. Pisarska (2017), “A Future for the EU Army? A Step-by-Step Approach”, FKP Policy Paper, The Casimir Pulaski Foundation
- K. Pisarska (2017), “Patterns of Polish-German Reconciliation – Are They Transferable into International Politics?”, in: The German-Polish Reconciliation Policies: Insights for the Koreas, eds. K. Kozłowski I K. Stuewe, Oficyna Wydawnicza SGH, s. 81–98.
- K. Pisarska (2016), “Soft Power in North America and Europe”, in: Routledge Handbook of Soft Power, edited by Naren Chitty, Craig Hayden, Li Ji, Gary Rawnsley, John Simons, Routledge.
- K. Pisarska (2015) „How the Promise of Europe Has Been Fulfilled”, Europe Needs Swagger – CNBC Special Report, 14 October 2015.
- K. Pisarska (2015), „Central Europe and the Immigrant Crisis: Understanding the East-West European Divide”, The Australian Outlook, Australian Institute of International Affairs, Canberra.
- K. Pisarska (2015), “Poland’s strategic awakening: a new leader appears”, The Strategist, Australian Strategic Policy Institute, Canberra, 6 May 2015.
- K. Pisarska (2015), „Peace Diplomacy and the Domestic Dimension of Norwegian Foreign Policy: The Insider’s Accounts”, Scandinavian Political Studies Volume 38, Issue 2, p. 198–215.
- K. Pisarska (2014), “How Visegradians can emulate the Scandinavians in telling their story to the world”, CPD Monitor, Vol.6, Issue 2, Summer 2014.
- K. Pisarska (2014), „The role of domestic public engagement in the formulation and implementation of U.S. Government-sponsored Educational Exchanges – an Insider’s Account”, Place Branding & Public Diplomacy, Palgrave McMillan.
- K. Pisarska (2012), „From Great Atlanticists to Great Europeans? The Impact of Obama’s Foreign Policy on Central Europe”, in: Obama, US Politics, and Transatlantic Relations: Change or Continuity?, ed. G. Scott-Smith, Peter Lang Publishers, Frankfurt.
- K. Pisarska (2012), “European Integration Studies in Political Science: the case of Poland”, in: Analyzing European Union Politics, eds. F. Bindi & K. A. Eliassen, Il Mulino, Bologna.
- K. Pisarska (2011), „America and the Eastern Partnership Initiative: From Friend to Meaningful Contributor”, Central European Digest, Issue Brief no. 120, Center for European Policy Analysis, Washington D.C.
