= Casimir Pulaski Foundation =

Polish think tank

- Fundacja im. Kazimierza Pułaskiego
- Formation: 2004; 22 years ago
- Founder: Zbigniew Pisarski, Katarzyna Pisarska, Radosław Ciszewski, Adam Jarczyński
- Purpose: Think Tank on Foreign and Security Policy
- Location: Warsaw, Poland
- President: Zbigniew Pisarski
- Website: pulaski.pl

The Casimir Pulaski Foundation (Polish: Fundacja im. Kazimierza Pułaskiego, FKP) is a prominent independent, non-partisan think tank based in Warsaw, Poland. Named after General Casimir Pulaski, the foundation specializes in foreign and security policy, focusing on transatlantic and post-Soviet contexts. It is one of two Polish non-governmental organizations that partners with the Council of Europe.

== Overview ==
The Foundation was established in Warsaw in 2004 by Zbigniew Pisarski, Katarzyna Pisarska, Radosław Ciszewski, and Adam Jarczyński.

Its areas of focus include publishing strategic analyses for political, civil society, as well as private actors, advising decision-makers, and organizing the Warsaw Security Forum.

In 2017, the Foundation received the Think Tank Award from Prospect as the best international affairs think tank in the EU. Additionally, it was recognized as the leading Polish think tank in the field of defence and security policy in the 2018, 2019 and 2020 Global Go To Think Tank Index reports.

On 22 December 2025 the Russian Prosecutor General's Office has declared the activities of the Casimir Pulaski Foundation undesirable accusing it of pursuing a "hostile policy" toward Russia and "developing strategies for military and economic containment of Russia's development, waging information warfare, and expanding sanctions."

== Fields of activity ==
The Foundation conducts research with a special focus on Central and Eastern Europe, publishing analyses and providing policy advice. It also organizes seminars and workshops, as well as the Warsaw Security Forum. The Foundation is part of the "Women in International Security" network and the "Grupa Zagranica," an association of Polish non-governmental organizations for international cooperation.

=== Publications ===
In collaboration with international experts from various fields (foreign policy, defense, energy, democratic resilience), the Foundation regularly publishes the Pulaski Policy Papers, the Pulaski Report, and the Pulaski Commentaries and the Experts Commentaries. These publications provide analysis of foreign and domestic policy and economic issues relevant to Poland.

=== Warsaw Security Forum ===
The Foundation organizes the Warsaw Security Forum, an international conference that attracts over 2500 participants and focuses on security and defense issues affecting NATO member states, the European Union, and other partner countries. Held annually in Warsaw since 2014, the Forum brings together representatives from over 90 countries to discuss current security challenges and strategies, and to foster dialogue between policymakers, experts, and civil society actors.

== Knight of Freedom Award ==
As part of the Warsaw Security Forum, the Foundation has presented the Knight of Freedom Award every year since 2005 to people and institutions who have contributed to the promotion of values represented by Casimir Pulaski such as freedom, justice, and democracy.

== Projects ==
- Warsaw Security Forum
- International Centre for Ukrainian Victory
- Women in International Security
- Knight of Freedom
- Wargaming and Simulations
- Women at Work
- 360-degree Cooperation
