= Intersex people in the United States military =

The regulations regarding the service of intersex people in the United States Armed Forces are vague and inconsistent due to the wide range of human intersex conditions. The United States Armed Forces as a whole does not officially ban intersex people from service but does exclude many based on the form of their status. Policies regarding all intersex people are not addressed formally although depending on the type of sex variation some intersex people are allowed to serve. The United States military and their requirements for service makes it so they are frequently in a unique predicament when it comes to intersex bodies. With their position of needing to discern between male and female bodies, they are exposed to a broad variety of people, such as those who are intersex whose bodies may not match either classification and are more difficult to make decisions on. This ambiguity leads to confusion regarding military medical, behavioral, and legal laws.

== History ==
When the skeleton of Casimir Pulaski, a famed American Revolutionary War general, was exhumed and studied, several female features were found which led to speculation that Pulaski was likely intersex. Physically, Pulaski had facial hair and — despite his female sexual organs and the question of whether or not Pulaski was biologically a female or intersex — it is undeniable that his gender identity was presented as male. In a 2020 response piece by David Albert Jones, the author uses the case of Pulaski to argue that someone's initial anatomy does not impact their expression and experience of the cultural aspects of identifying as a different gender. Jones argues that this has historically impacted and continues to impact the social implications of transitioning, as well as where and in what situations, such as the United States military, that intersex people fit into.

In November 1861, during the Civil War, a person named Ellen Burnham was arrested by Union Army detectives and subjected to a medical procedure, but announced as a man to the surprise of Burnham's interrogators. Burham later changed their first name to Edgar, and has been described as "the first person" in U.S. history "to be lawfully married as both an adult male and female".

A 2007 report commissioned by the Michael D. Palm Center stated that the U.S. military saw intersex and transgender individuals as "medically and psychologically deviant", with medical reasons being a disqualifying factor, with the report arguing that transphobia and discrimination against intersex people existed within the U.S. military. In November 2008, the official policy of the U.S. Army and U.S. Marines was that intersex individuals, along with those who were transgender, or had other reported "disorders", had medical or psychological problems, meaning that they were ineligible to serve. In the U.S. Navy and Air Force, individuals were disqualified because of assumed "medical treatments".

In May 2017, scholar Kelly L. Fisher stated that U.S. military policies prevented intersex, and transgender, people from serving openly. In April 2019, U.S. military policy stated that intersex is a rare exception to a "person’s biological status". Previously, in March 2017, a pamphlet from the Navy and Marine Corps Public Health Center mentioned intersex individuals.

In a September 2020 study of transgender soldiers in the U.S. military, 0.5% identified as intersex.

== Policies and treatment ==
People born with non-standard genital anatomy or ambiguous genitalia are largely excluded from military service. This practice is believed to have been first introduced in 1961, alongside a ban on transvestites. According to a 2007 report from the Michael D. Palm Center, there is a long list of disqualifying genital differences that are used to bar individuals from service. For example, having one undescended testicle can make a man ineligible for service. Enclosure 4 of "Induction in the Military Services; dated April 10, 2010" instruction, entitled "Medical Standards For Appointment, Enlistment, Or Induction", is the one that identifies the preclusion of some intersex people from serving in the military.

According to The Crimson, the military's policy on genital differences is explicitly discriminatory. Despite the steady increase of other previously excluded members into the military since the repeal of "Don't ask, don't tell", there has not been much change with respect to the status of intersex people. Military medical policies still prevent intersex people from serving uncloseted. However, the military does provide some surgeries for intersex people which they deem 'medically necessary' as opposed to 'cosmetic'. The Veterans Health Administration (VHA) does distinguish between surgeries for transgender individuals and intersex persons. In 2015, this allowed intersex persons to receive medically necessary treatment that was still prohibited for transgender people. This was because of the belief that intersex surgery caused "fewer practical concerns". However, a history of genital surgery prior to service is considered an acceptable reason to discharge a service member. The acceptance of transgender individuals in 2016 by the Armed Forces did not touch on intersex people and they are still subject to specific reviews before enlistment, as noted before. An intersex National Guardsman who had sex reassignment surgery expressed that he was afraid and uncertain of what would become of him after the passing of the bill. The subsequent attempt at banning transgender troops by President Donald Trump in 2017 also did not touch on the state of intersex personnel, and it was unclear if the ban would have any intentional or unintentional effects on them. A case against the attempted ban noted that the VHA had begun health care for transgender and intersex veterans following a June 2011 order.

Intersex activist and Navy veteran Dana Zzyym has expressed that their family's military background made it out of the question for them to be associated with the queer community as a youth due to the prevalence of homophobia in the armed forces. Their parents hid Zzyym's status as intersex from them and Zzyym discovered their identity and the surgeries their parents had approved for them by themselves after their Navy service. Zzyym is the first veteran to be issued a gender-neutral passport.

In March 2017, a study in Transgender Health examined the Department of Veterans Affairs system which affects transgender and intersex veterans, noting "their experiences with healthcare services provided by the VHA", pointing out VHA directives promulgated over the years, including a directive in February 2013, and discrimination that intersex veterans face. The study concluded that more needed to be done to ensure the VA provides transgender and intersex veterans with "adequate healthcare". In June 2019, a Congressional Research Service report stated that the United States Department of Veterans Affairs provides "medically necessary care" to intersex and transgender veterans.

In February 2021, Lavelle Wollam described experience of being denied from the U.S. military because Wollam was intersex. In March 2021, the U.S. Department of Defense stating that U.S. military would be "promoting and protecting the human rights" of intersex and other LGBTQ people.

In a 2022 book about gender, identity, and behavior in the U.S. military, scholars concluded that the status of transgender and intersex people in the U.S. military is unresolved due to "legal, political, and regulatory battles".

== Opinions ==
In 2007, the Palm Center released a report concluding that most of the military's beliefs about intersex people were myths and that neither intersex nor transgender peoples' medical problems posed any barrier to effective service. The study also argued that the rigidity of sexual difference, gender roles, and sexuality are "becoming increasingly less absolute," which could raise questions regarding the admission, retention, training, housing, and other services of intersex individuals in the armed forces.

In 2010, Republican representative Duncan D. Hunter implied that intersex people were always banned from service. However, this claim was contradicted by a veteran who stated that she was allowed to serve openly and be deployed during Desert Storm as an intersex woman. Activist Autumn Sandeen also refuted Hunter's claims in a statement on her blog. In contrast, another response to Hunter was from Choire Sicha of The Awl who stated that "intersex people aren't welcome to serve, but no one's quite sure how and why", but did not elaborate on if they believed this referred to all conditions or just visible ones. Along with trans and non-heterosexual people, Hunter includes intersex people on his list of queer groups which he believes to be unfit for service because he holds the belief that they would disrupt unit cohesion. At the time when speaking about the subject he referred to intersex people by the term "hermaphrodites", which drew criticism from several intersex advocates and allies since it is a medically inaccurate term for a human being and is seen as a slur in the 20th century. His comments were also mocked on the NPR comedy news show Wait Wait... Don't Tell Me! which joked about his opinion on the subject, claiming that including intersex people would be advantageous to the military, since they could "pursue enemies into both men's and women's restrooms". This joke was poorly received by some, including writers of ShadowProof, who stated that it was both insulting to intersex people and a play on the negative stereotype of trans people as potential bathroom sexual predators, and Queerty.

In May 2018, River Champion in E-International Relations noted the "struggles for autonomy" for intersex individuals within existing "military frameworks"

== Veterans ==
Intersex veterans are entitled to "medically necessary" surgeries. When transgender people were banned from receiving sex reassignment surgery, intersex people were also banned from these surgeries. This meant that someone who was in the military presenting as male in their records could not transition to a female identity with help from the United States Department of Veterans Affairs, even if they were always predominantly female in all but writing. Even if those in the Military human resources department are accepting and want to help these individuals, the established limitations would not allow them to give them assistance, whether or not these surgeries are happening as a veteran or even to "a decorated war hero".

This was mended in 2011 by the Department of Veteran Affairs with the creation of the "Directive for Providing Health Care for Transgender and Intersex Veterans". Before this, transgender veterans described their care as at the Veterans Association as "inconsistent, insensitive, and, at times, prejudiced". This included situations such as transgender males being denied mammograms and transgender females being denied prostate exams, a bias that presumably extended to intersex individuals whose genders could not be easily discerned.

== By service ==
=== United States Air Force ===
Many U.S. Air Force recruiters think that intersex people should be disqualified from service due to "the expected increased demand for medical treatments" but intersex persons are still allowed to serve in the Civil Air Patrol.

=== United States Army ===
In the U.S. Army, the official policy is that individuals who identify as intersex or have other sex-related disorders are medically problematic and/or psychologically disturbed; hence, they are not eligible to serve.

=== United States Coast Guard ===
Intersex people are allowed to serve in the Coast Guard Auxiliary. However, they must choose to be represented as either "male" or "female" on their records.

=== United States Marine Corps ===
The USMC takes the same stance as the Army, disqualifying both intersex people and transgender people from service.

=== United States Navy ===
In 2008, many U.S. Navy recruiters believed that intersex people should be disqualified from service, mainly due to the expectation that they would cause increased demand for medical treatment.

== ROTC ==
The Reserve Officers' Training Corps is obliged to follow the guidelines set by the military and has rejected intersex youth because of this. This, along with their exclusion of transgender people, has led to criticism from and of schools such as Harvard which did not allow the ROTC until "Don't ask, don't tell" was repealed in 2010, but welcomed them afterwards. The critics argue that the return of the ROTC to campus violates the school's non-discrimination clause.

== See also ==
- Intersex rights in the United States
- Transgender people and military service
- Pulaski: The Forgotten Hero of Two Worlds, historical novel about Casimir Pulaski which covers his intersex status
- The General Was Female?, documentary about Pulaski's intersex status
