= Warka =

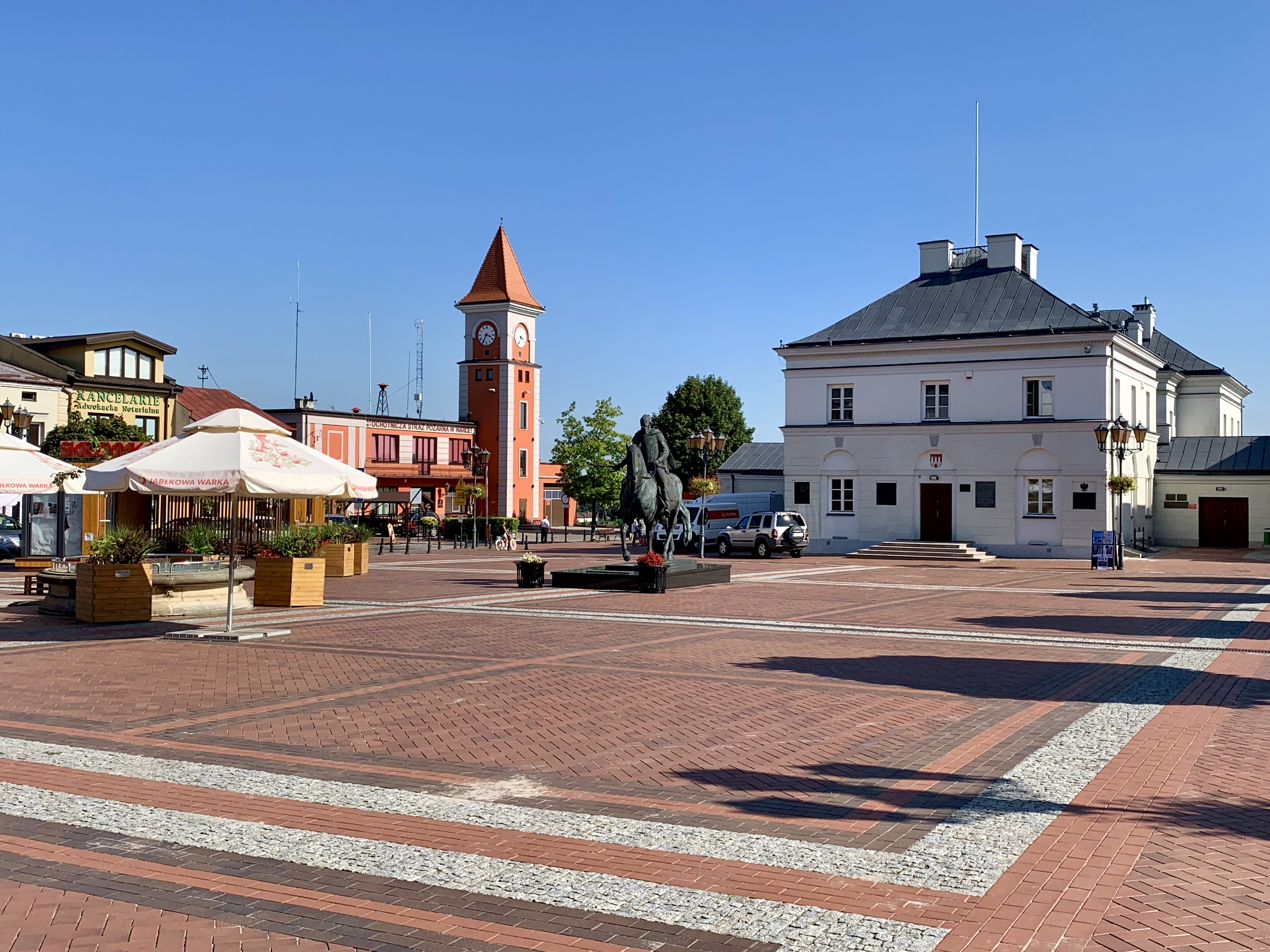
- Classicist town hall at the Hetman Stefan Czarnecki Square

- Coat of arms

- Location within Poland
- Coordinates: 51°47′N 21°12′E
- Country: Poland
- Voivodeship: Masovian
- County: Grójec
- Gmina: Warka
- Established: 13th century
- Town rights: 1321

Government
  - Mayor: Dariusz Gizka

Area
  - Total: 2,677 km^{2} (1,034 sq mi)

Population (2013)
  - Total: 11 858
  - Density: 0.0041/km^{2} (0.011/sq mi)
- Time zone: UTC+1 (CET)
  - Summer (DST): UTC+2 (CEST)
- Postal code: 05-660
- Area code: +48 48
- Car plates: WGR
- Website: http://www.warka.pl

Warka [ˈvarka] (Yiddish: ווארקע) is a town in east-central Poland, located on the left bank of the Pilica river (60 km or 37 mi south of Warsaw), with 11,858 inhabitants (2013). It has been situated in Grójec County, in the Masovian Voivodeship, since 1999; previously it was in the Radom Voivodeship from 1975 to 1998.

Warka obtained its city charter in 1321. A village called Winiary, which today is part of Warka, is the countryside residence of Pulaskis family where General Casimir Pulaski spent his childhood and the birthplace of Colonel Piotr Wysocki (September 10, 1797). Warka is also known for its famous brewery (since 1478).

For the duration of the UEFA Euro 2012, Warka hosted the Croatia national football team.

== Notable people ==
- Casimir Pulaski (1745–1779), nobleman, soldier and military commander
- Piotr Wysocki (1797–1875), military commander
- Israel Yitzhak Kalish (1779–1848), hasidic rebbe
- Yaakov Aryeh Guterman (1792–1874), hasidic rebbe
- Adam Jarzębski (c. 1590– c. 1648), early Baroque Polish composer, violinist, poet, and writer

== Gallery ==
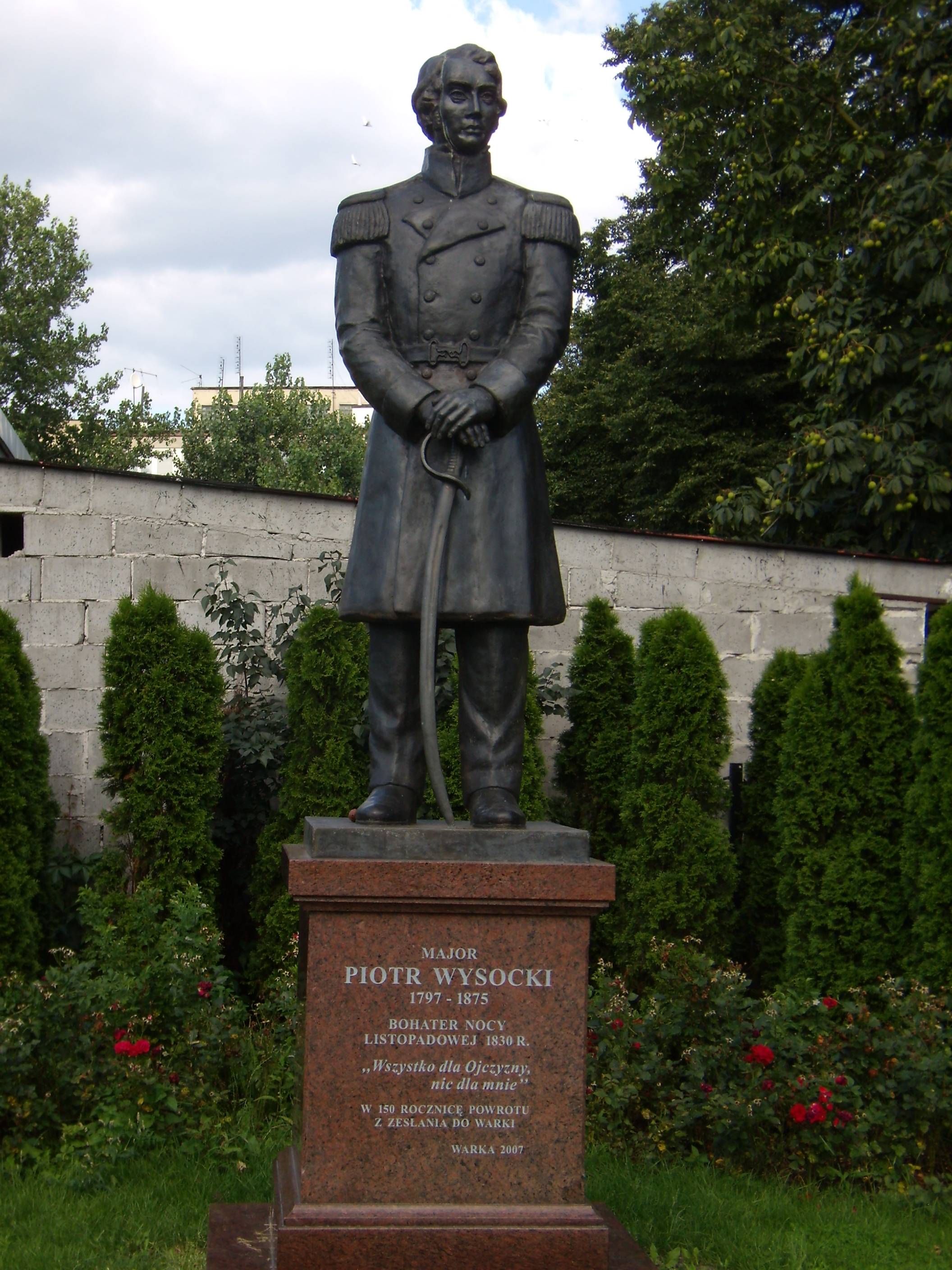
Monument of Piotr Wysocki

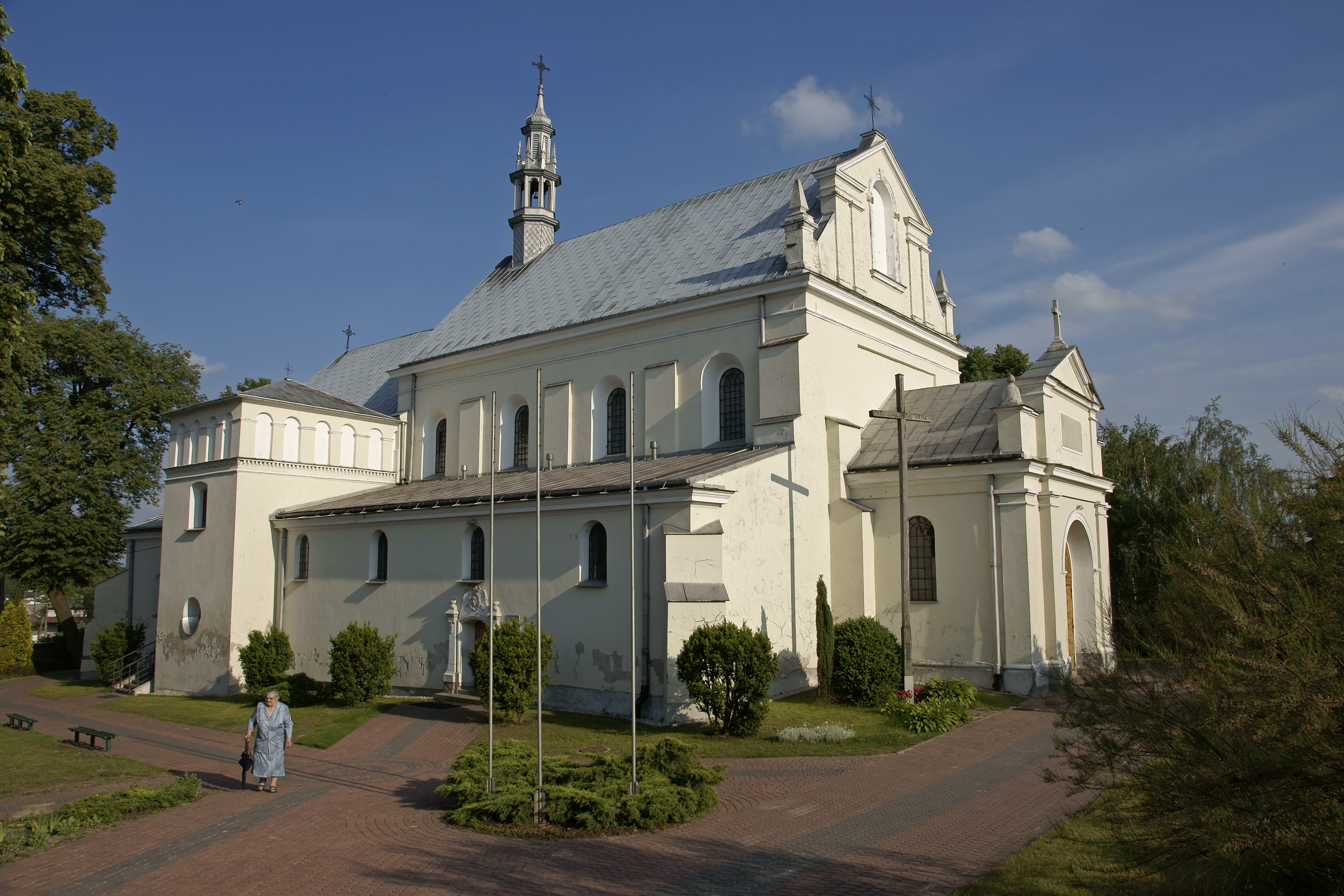
Saint Nicholas Church

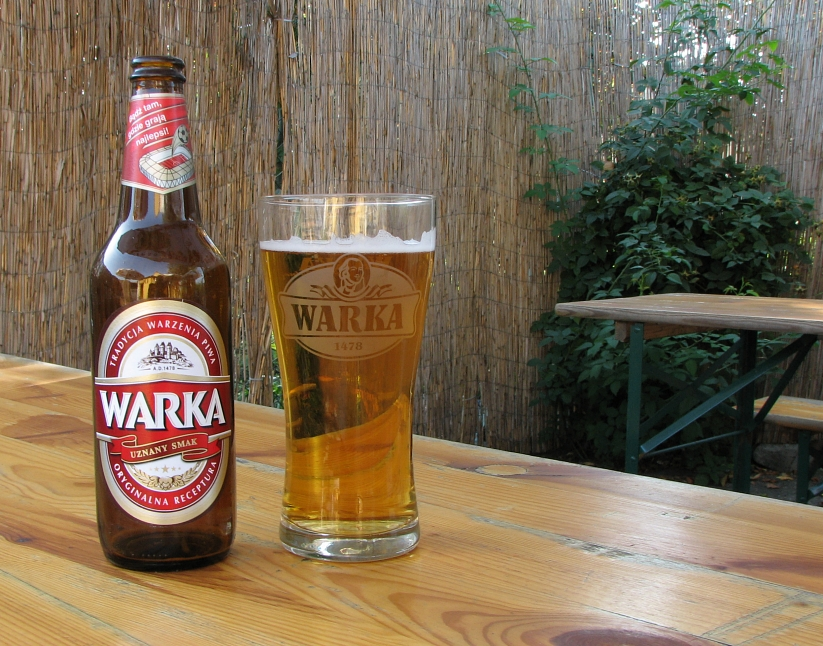
Warka Brewery
