= Piotr Wysocki =

Leader of the Polish November Uprising

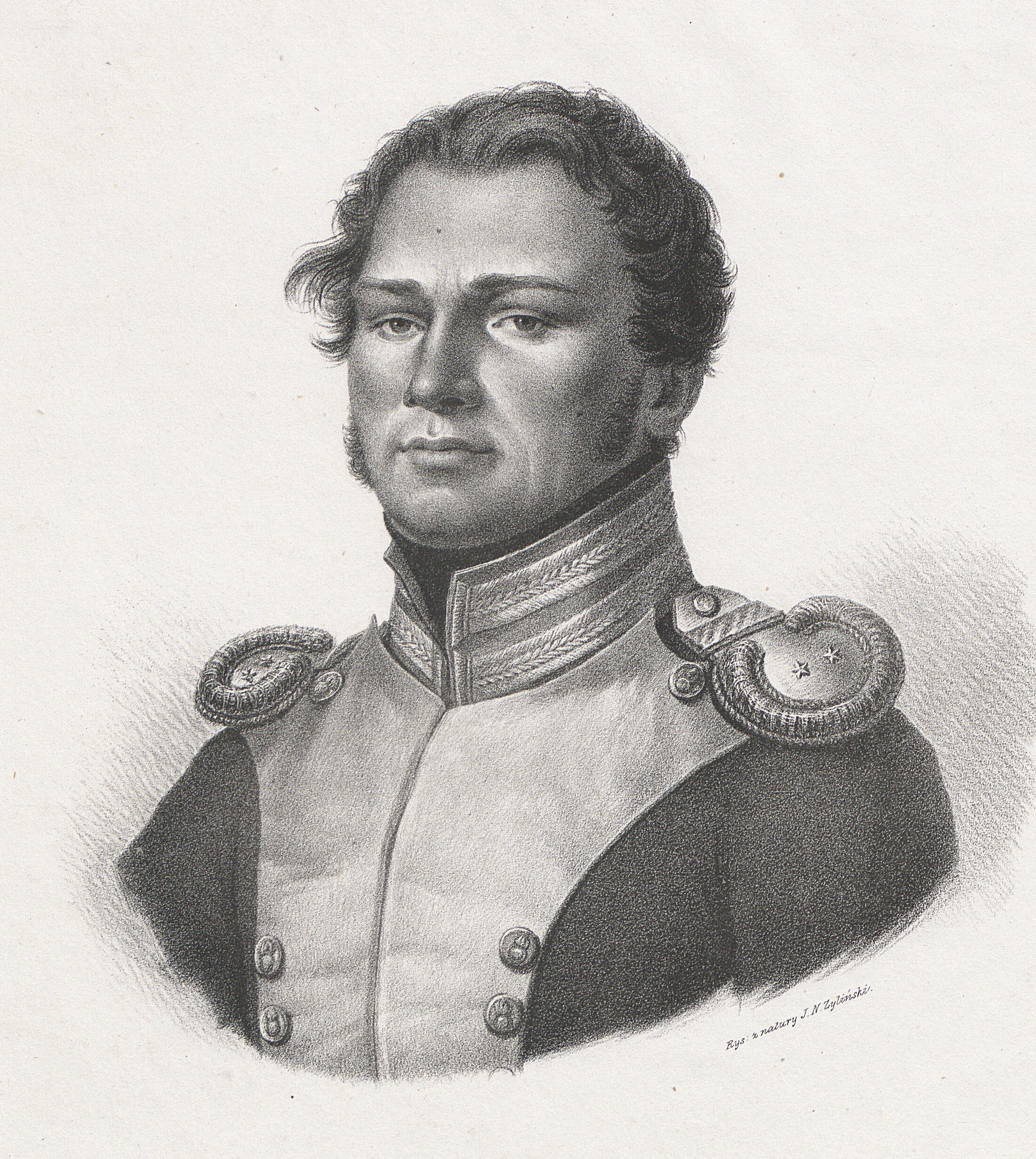
Piotr Wysocki; portrait by Jan Nepomucen Żyliński (1790–1838)

Piotr Wysocki (Polish: [ˈpjɔtr vɘ̟ˈsɔt͡s.ki]; 10 September 1797 in Warka – 6 January 1875 there), was a Polish captain and leader of the Polish conspiracy against Russian Tsar Nicolas I. He was a nobleman (szlachcic) who bore the Odrowąż coat of arms. On 29 November 1830, he raised military insurgents, starting the November Uprising against Russia. In 1831, he was sentenced to death by Russians, but his sentence was commuted to a 20 years exile in Siberia.

On 3 March 1831, he was awarded the Gold Cross of the Virtuti Militari.

== See also ==
- Bust of Piotr Wysocki
