= Podlaski =

Podlaski (femine: Podlaska) may refer to the following places:

- Podlaski, Kuyavian-Pomeranian Voivodeship (north-central Poland)
- Podlaski, Lublin Voivodeship (east Poland)
- Podlaski, Podlaskie Voivodeship (north-east Poland)
- Biała Podlaska
- Bielsk Podlaski
- Janów Podlaski
  - Janów Podlaski Stud Farm
- Komarówka Podlaska
- Leśna Podlaska
- Międzyrzec Podlaski
- Radzyń Podlaski
- Sokołów Podlaski
