= Pulaski Park, Northampton =

Park in Massachusetts, United States

Coordinates: 42°19′02″N 72°37′59″W

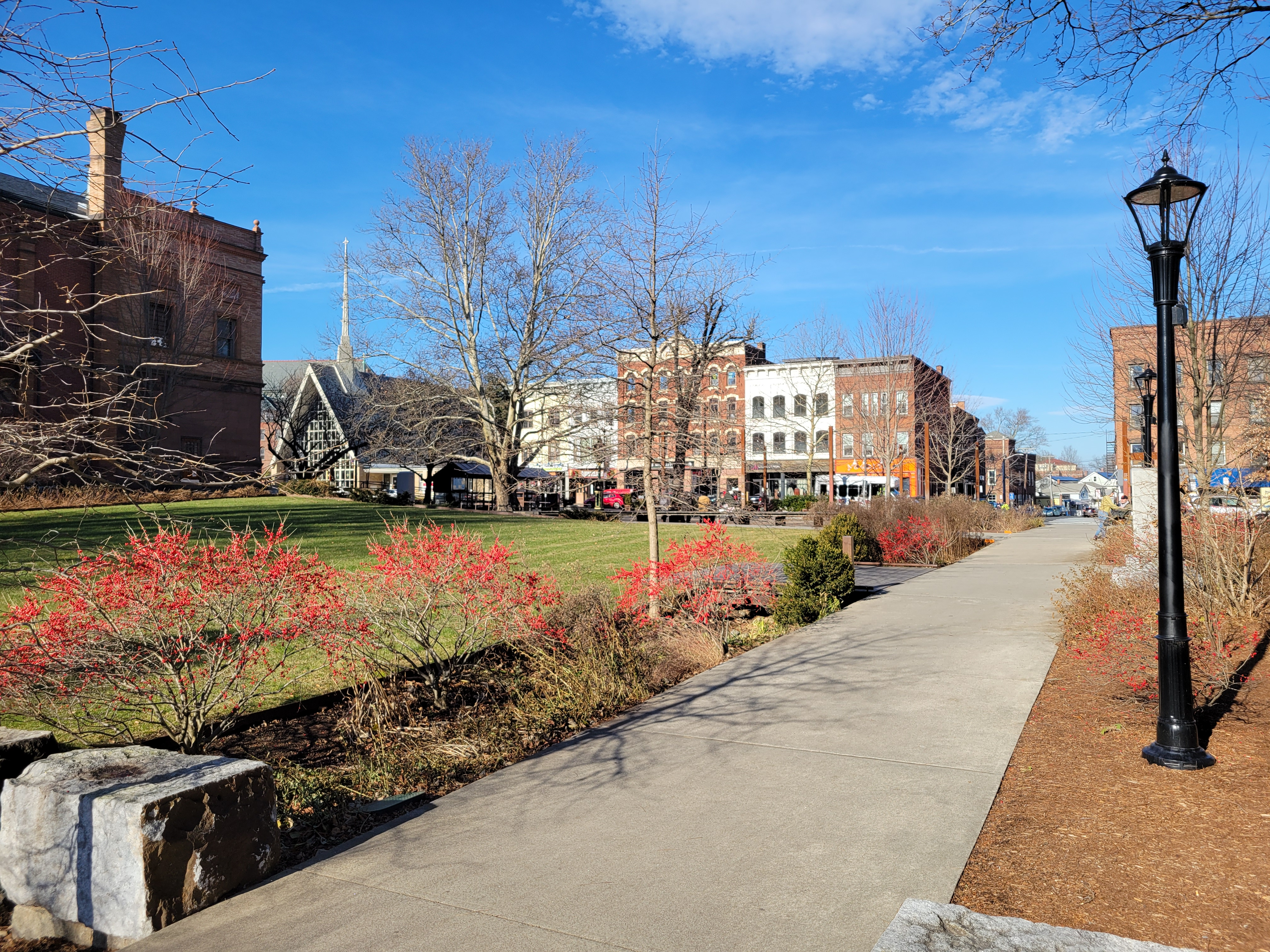
Pulaski Park in 2023

Pulaski Park is a small urban park located in the city of Northampton, Massachusetts. It is situated on Main Street (State Highway 9) between the City Hall and the Academy of Music Theatre. The park was named after Polish military leader Casimir Pulaski.

== Features ==
The park consists of shade trees, walkways, benches, a playground, and a small stage. The front of the park has a plaza with movable cafeteria tables and chairs. Behind the plaza is a grassy space suitable for picnics. The play area consists of stumps to jump on and a slide made out of Goshen stone. Planters and other features are made of rusty steel, serving as a nod to Northampton's industrial past. One environmentally friendly feature was added to the park is a stormwater garden consisting of plants that absorb rainwater and naturally treat it before being carried into the storm drainage system.

A bus stop that serves several routes on the Pioneer Valley Transit Authority (PVTA), including several routes leading to University of Massachusetts Amherst, is also located there.

== Renovations ==
The park, last renovated in 1976, fell into a state of disrepair and neglect. In addition, the park was dominated by concrete and lacked open green spaces. In 2014, a plan was adopted to renovate the existing park to make it more inviting to the public. Construction on the first phase started in late 2015. On July 22, 2016, the park reopened with a grand ceremony. The new incarnation of the park was themed around nature.

Phase II of the park renovation consists of the expansion of the park, improving connections to the adjacent Roundhouse Parking Lot and the New Haven-Northampton Rail. The work will consist of replacing the existing slope with a new set of stairs as well as a ramp with switchbacks for wheelchair users.
