= Józef Pułaski =

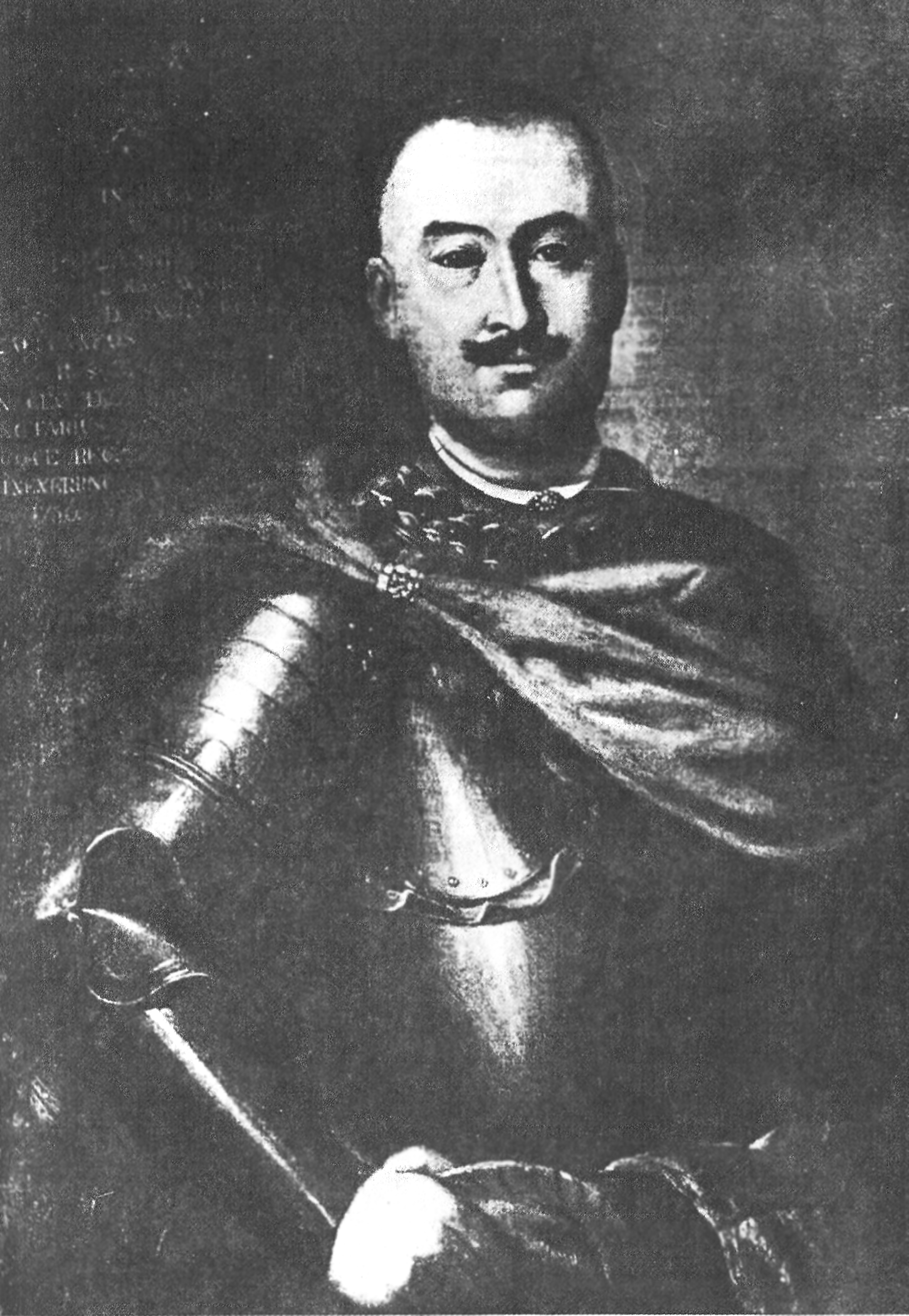
Józef Pułaski

Józef Pułaski of the house of Ślepowron (17 February 1704 – February 1769) was a Polish noble, starost of Warka, deputy to Sejm, one of the creators and members of the Konfederacja barska (Bar Confederation).

He was the father of Casimir Pulaski, Franciszek Ksawery Pułaski and Antoni Pułaski.
