= Pulaski County =

Pulaski County is the name of seven counties in the United States, all of which are named for Casimir Pulaski:

- Pulaski County, Arkansas
- Pulaski County, Georgia
- Pulaski County, Illinois
- Pulaski County, Indiana
- Pulaski County, Kentucky
- Pulaski County, Missouri
- Pulaski County, Virginia
