= Pulaski Township =

Pulaski Township may refer to:

- Pulaski Township, Lonoke County, Arkansas, in Lonoke County, Arkansas
- Pulaski Township, Michigan
- Pulaski Township, Morrison County, Minnesota
- Pulaski Township, Walsh County, North Dakota
- Pulaski Township, Williams County, Ohio
- Pulaski Township, Beaver County, Pennsylvania
- Pulaski Township, Lawrence County, Pennsylvania

== See also ==
- Commemoration of Casimir Pulaski
