= Casimir Pulaski =

Polish nobleman and American Revolutionary War general (1745–1779)

- Kazimierz Pułaski
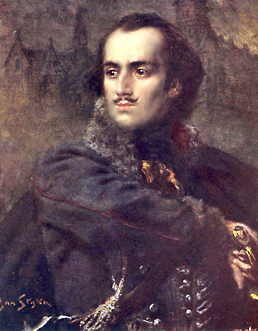
- Portrait of Pulaski by Jan Styka
- Born: March 4 or March 6, 1745 (Note: Older sources have cited varying dates and places of birth of Pulaski. The suggested alternative dates have been March 4, 1746, or 1747, and the alternative place of birth, Pułaski family manor at Winiary. Modern sources agree that Pulaski was born on March 4 or March 6, 1745, in the now-nonexistent Pulaski manor house, located near the present address 53 Nowy Świat St. near Warecka St. in Warsaw.); Warszawa, Polish–Lithuanian Commonwealth
- Died: October 11, 1779 (aged 34); Thunderbolt, Georgia, U.S.
- Burial place: Monterey Square, Savannah, Georgia
- Military career
- Allegiance: Polish–Lithuanian Commonwealth; United States
- Branch: Poland-Lithuanian Army; Continental Army
- Service years: 1762–1779
- Rank: Brigadier general
- Unit: Pulaski's Legion
- Conflicts: War of the Bar Confederation; Battle of Orzechowo; American Revolutionary War; Battle of Brandywine; Battle of Germantown; Battle of Chestnut Neck; Affair at Little Egg Harbor; Siege of Savannah †
- Coat of arms

Kazimierz Michał Władysław Wiktor Pułaski (Polish: [kaˈʑimjɛʂ puˈwaskʲi]; March 4 or 6, 1745 – October 11, 1779), anglicised as Casimir Pulaski (/ˈkæzɪmɪər pəˈlæski/ KA-zi-meer pə-LAS-kee), was a Polish nobleman, (Note: Pulaski was a member of the Szlachta, an untitled member of the Polish nobility. While some sources refer to him as a "count" this is likely an artifact of some well-publicized American letters and statements in which he is titled as such, in particular, Benjamin Franklin's letter of 1777. Americans of that era had a habit of giving such grandiose titles to all European nobles, to resemble the titles of famous European allies of the nascent American state such as Marquis de Lafayette or Baron von Steuben. Pulaski never used this title himself.) soldier, and military commander who has been called "The Father of American cavalry" or "The Soldier of Liberty". Born in Warsaw and following in his father's footsteps, he became interested in politics at an early age. He soon became involved in the military and in revolutionary affairs in the Polish–Lithuanian Commonwealth. Pulaski was one of the leading military commanders for the Bar Confederation and fought against the Commonwealth's foreign domination. When this uprising failed, he was driven into exile.

Following a recommendation by Benjamin Franklin, Pulaski traveled to North America to help in the American Revolutionary War. He distinguished himself throughout the revolution, most notably when he saved the life of George Washington. Pulaski became a general in the Continental Army, and he and his friend, the Hungary-born colonel commandant Michael Kovats, raised Pulaski's Legion and reformed the American cavalry as a whole. At the siege of Savannah, while leading a cavalry charge against British forces, he was fatally wounded by grapeshot and died shortly after.

Pulaski is remembered as a hero who fought for independence and freedom in Poland and the United States. Numerous places and events are named in his honor, and he is commemorated by many works of art. Pulaski is one of only eight people to be awarded honorary United States citizenship.

== Personal life ==
Pulaski was born on March 6, 1745, in the manor house of the Pułaski family in Warsaw, Poland. Casimir was the second eldest son of Marianna Zielińska and Józef Pułaski, who was an advocatus at the Crown Tribunal, the Starost of Warka, and one of the town's most notable inhabitants. He was a brother of Francis Xavier Pulaski and Antoni Pułaski. His family bore the Ślepowron coat of arms.

The Pułaski family was Catholic. Early in his youth, Casimir Pulaski attended an elite college run by Theatines, a male religious order of the Catholic Church in Warsaw, but did not finish his education.

There is some circumstantial evidence that Pulaski was a Freemason. When Gilbert du Motier, Marquis de Lafayette laid the cornerstone of the monument erected in Pulaski's honour in Monterey Square in Savannah in 1824, a full Masonic ceremony took place with Richard T. Turner, High Priest of the Georgia chapter, conducting the service. Other sources claim Pulaski was a member of the Masonic Army Lodge in Maryland. A Masonic Lodge in Chicago is named Casimir Pulaski Lodge, No.1167, and a brochure issued by the lodge claims he obtained the degree of Master Mason on June 19, 1779, and was buried with full Masonic honours. To date, no surviving documents of Pulaski's actual membership have been found.

== Military career ==
In 1762, Pulaski started his military career as a page of Carl Christian Joseph of Saxony, Duke of Courland and the Polish king's vassal. He spent six months at the ducal court in Mitau, during which the court was interned in the palaces by the Russian forces occupying the area. He then returned to Warsaw, and his father gave him the village of Zezulińce in Podole; from that time, Pulaski used the title of Starost of Zezulińce.

=== Bar Confederation ===
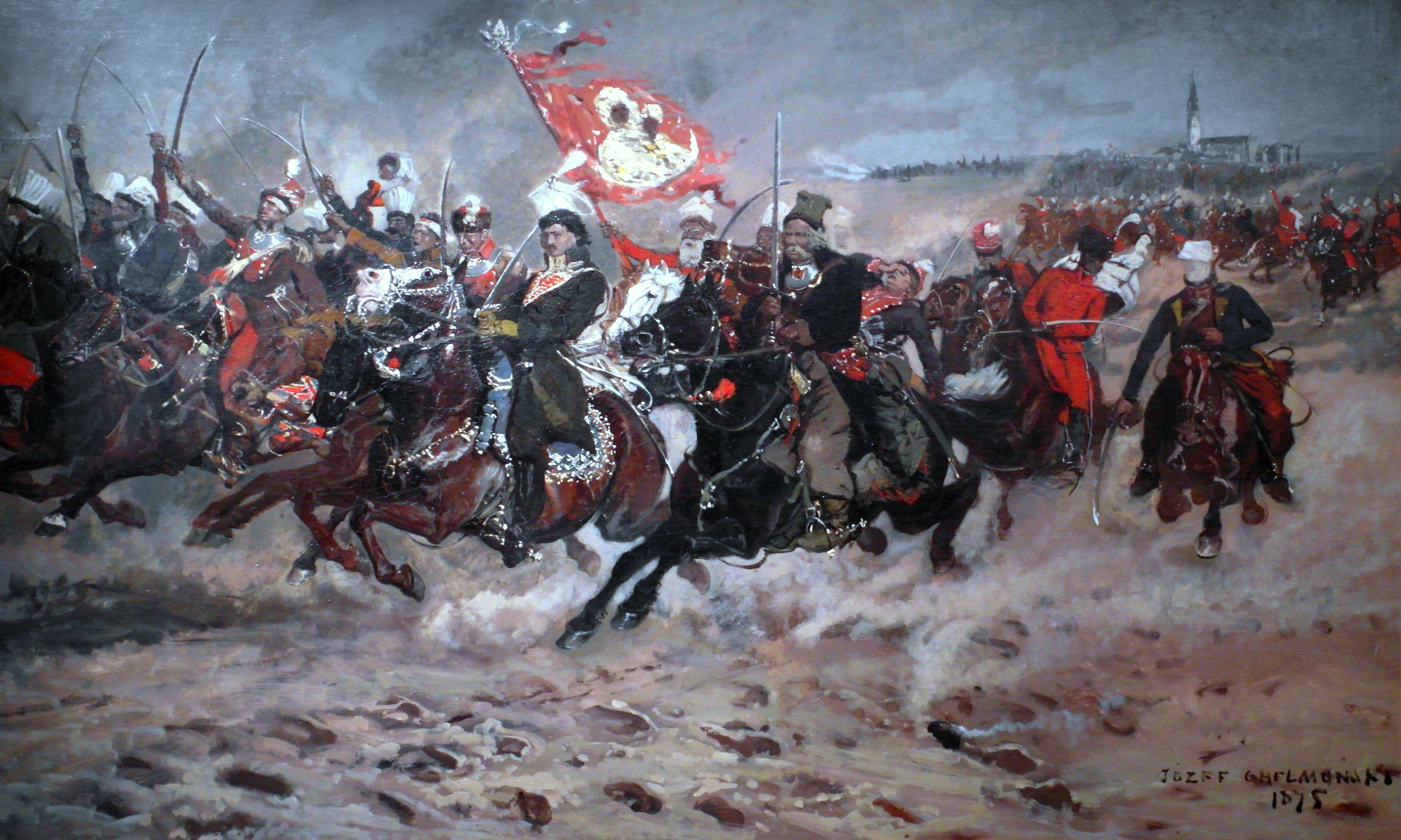
Pulaski at Częstochowa, an 1875 painting by Józef Chełmoński.

He took part in the 1764 election of the new Polish monarch, Stanisław II Augustus, with his family. In December 1767, Pulaski and his father became involved with the Bar Confederation, which saw King Stanisław as a Russian puppet and sought to curtail Russian hegemony over the Commonwealth. The confederation was actively opposed by the Russian forces stationed in Poland. Pulaski recruited a unit and, on February 29, 1768, signed the act of the confederation, thus declaring himself an official supporter of the movement.

On March 6, he received a pułkownik (colonel) rank and commanded a chorągiew of cavalry. In March and April, Pulaski agitated among the Polish military, successfully convincing some forces to join the Confederates. He fought his first battle on April 20 near Pohorełe. It was a victory, as was another on April 23 near Starokostiantyniv. An engagement at Kaczanówka on April 28 resulted in a defeat. In early May, he garrisoned Chmielnik (Khmilnyk) but was forced to retreat when allied reinforcements were defeated.

He retreated to a monastery in Berdyczów, which he defended during a siege by royalist forces for over two weeks until June 16. Eventually, he was forced to surrender and was taken captive by the Russians. On June 28, he was released in exchange for a pledge that he would not again take up arms with the Confederates, and that he would lobby the Confederates to end hostilities. However, Pulaski considered the assurance to be non-binding and made a public declaration to that effect upon reaching a camp of the Confederates at the end of July. Agreeing to the pledge in the first place weakened his authority and popularity among the Confederates, and his own father considered whether or not he should be Court-martialed. Some heated debates followed, and Pulaski was reinstated to active-duty only in early September.

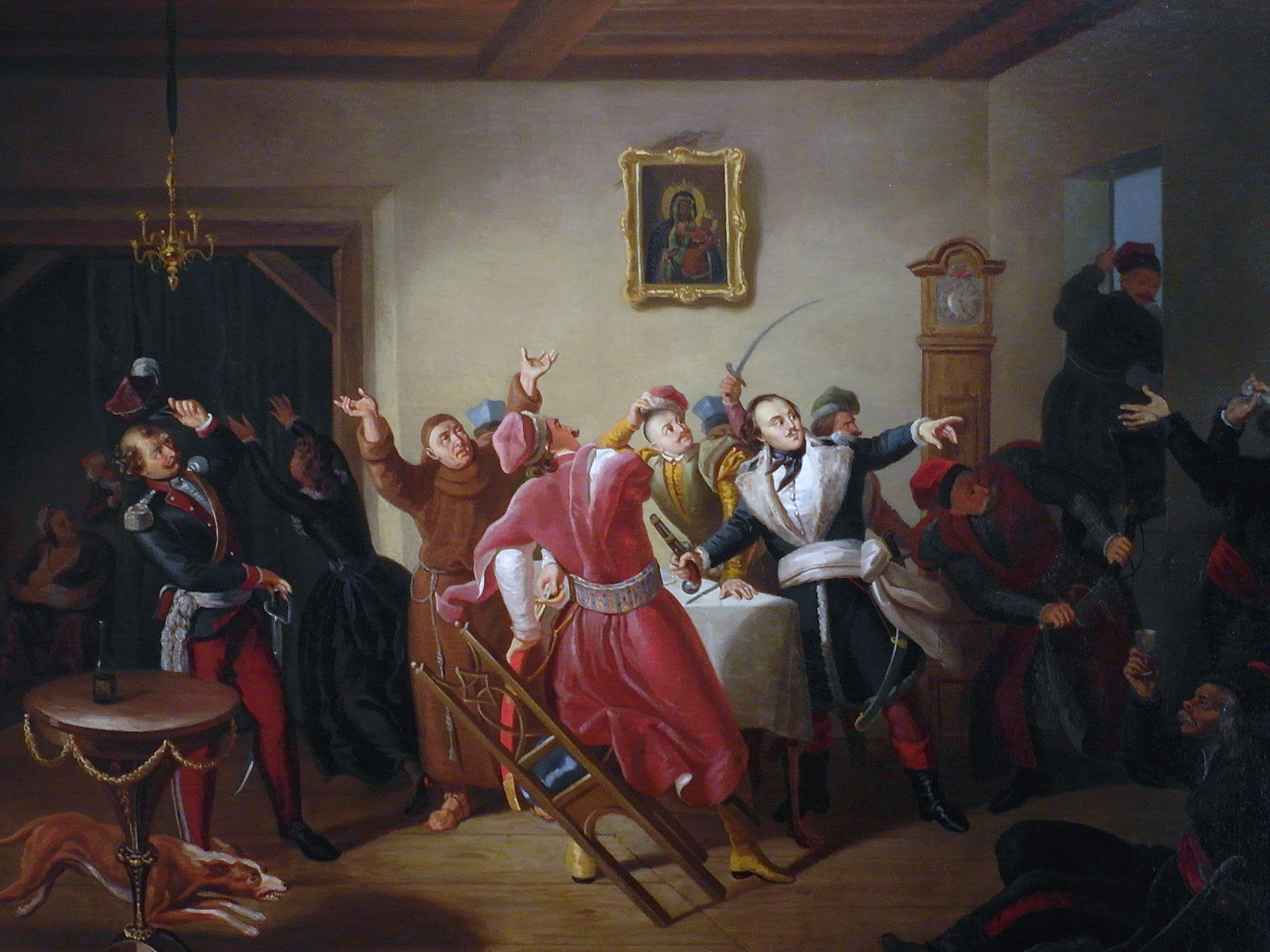
Casimir Pulaski gathering supporters for the Confederation at Bar. Painting by Korneli Szlegel.

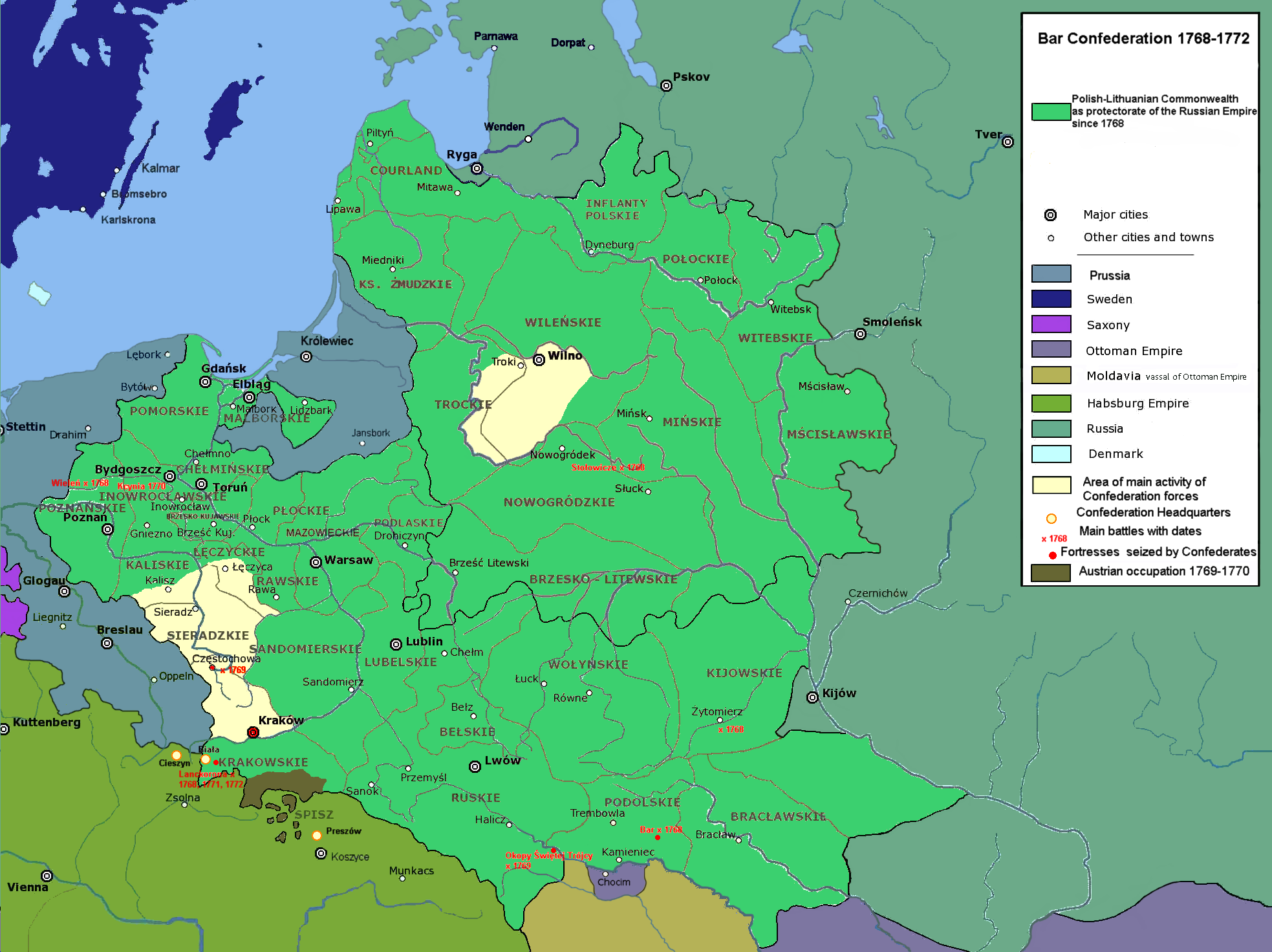
A map of the Bar Confederation conflict in Poland between 1768 and 1772, with white areas being controlled by the Confederates.

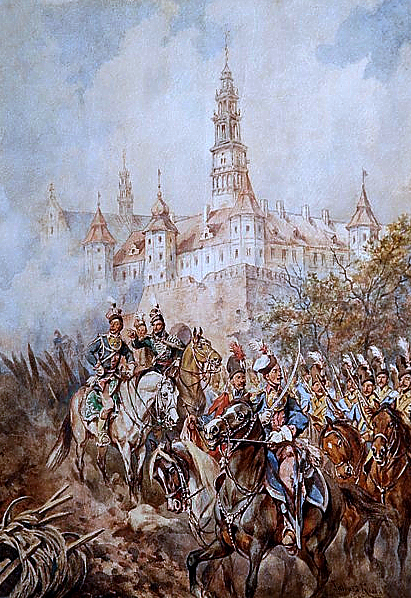
Pulaski at the walls of the Jasna Góra Monastery in 1770, by artist Juliusz Kossak.

In 1769, Pulaski's unit was again besieged by numerically superior forces, this time in the old fortress of Okopy Świętej Trójcy, which had served as his base of operations since December the previous year. After a staunch defence, he was able to break the Russian siege. On April 7, he was made the regimentarz of the Kraków Voivodeship. In May and June he operated near Przemyśl, but failed to take the town. Criticised by some of his fellow Confederates, Pulaski departed to Lithuania with his allies and a force of about 600 men on June 3. There, Pulaski attempted to incite a larger revolt against Russia.

Despite no decisive military successes, he was able to assemble a 4,000-strong army and deliver it back to a Confederate staging point. This excursion received international notice and gained him a reputation as the most effective military leader in the Bar Confederation. Next, he moved with his unit towards Zamość and — after nearly losing his life to the inferior forces of the future Generalissimo Alexander Suvorov in the disastrous Battle of Orekhowa (Note: Also rendered: "Orzechowo", "Orekhovo". Three hundred and twenty (320) officers and men overall against 2,000–3,000 Poles; both sides had two guns each. Pulaski's brother Franz lost his life to a pistol shot from Russian squadron leader count Castelli whose target was Casimir himself. This translation is from the Russian Wikipedia Page, ru:Сражение под Ореховом ('Battle of Orekhovo') — which is supported by reliable sources in Russian, including the letters and official reports on the matter made by Suvorov himself.) — on the next day, September 15, he was again defeated at the Battle of Włodawa, with his forces almost completely dispelled. He spent the rest of the year rebuilding his unit in the region of Podkarpacie.

In February 1770, Pulaski moved near Nowy Targ, and in March, helped to subdue the mutiny of Józef Bierzyński. Based in Izby, he operated in southern Lesser Poland. On May 13 his force was defeated at the Battle of Dęborzyn. Around June 9–10 in Prešov, in a conference with other Confederate leaders, he met Joseph II, Holy Roman Emperor, who complimented Pulaski on his actions. On July 3–4, Pulaski's camp was captured by Johann von Drewitz, and he was forced to retreat into Austria. Early in August he met with the French emissary, Charles François Dumouriez. He disregarded an order to take Lanckorona and instead cooperated with Michał Walewski in a raid on Kraków on the night of August 31.

He then departed for Częstochowa. On September 10, along with Walewski, he used subterfuge to take control of the Jasna Góra monastery. On September 18 he met Franciszka z Krasińskich, an aristocrat from the Krasiński family and the wife of Charles of Saxony, Duke of Courland. He impressed her and she became one of his protectors. Around September 22–24 Walewski was made the commandant of Jasna Góra, which slighted Pulaski. Nonetheless, he continued as the de facto commander of Confederate troops stationed in and around Jasna Góra.

Between September 10, 1770, and January 14, 1771, Pulaski, Walewski and Józef Zaremba commanded the Polish forces during the siege of Jasna Góra monastery. They successfully defended against Drewitz in a series of engagements, the largest one on November 11, followed by a siege from December 31 to January 14. The defense of Jasna Góra further enhanced his reputation among the Confederates and abroad. A popular Confederate song taunting Drewitz included lyrics about Pulaski and Jasna Góra. Pulaski intended to pursue Drewitz, but a growing discord between him and Zaremba prevented this from becoming a real option.

In February 1771, Pulaski operated around Lublin. On February 25 he was victorious at Tarłów and on the night of February 28 and March 1, his forces besieged Kraśnik. In March that year he became one of the members of the Confederates' War Council. Dumouriez, who became a military adviser to the Confederates, at the time described him as "spontaneous, more proud than ambitious, friend of the prince of Courland, enemy of the Potocki family, brave and honest" as well as popular among other commanders. This was due to his refusal to follow orders and adhere to discipline. Jędrzej Kitowicz who met him as well around that time described him as short and thin, pacing and speaking quickly, and uninterested in women or drinking. He enjoyed fighting against the Russians above everything else, and was daring to the extent he forgot about his safety in battles, resulting in his many failures on the battlefield.

In May 1771, Pulaski advanced on Zamość, refusing to coordinate an operation with Dumouriez against Alexander Suvorov. Without Pulaski's support, the Confederates were defeated at the Battle of Lanckorona. Pulaski's forces were victorious at the Battle of Majdany, and briefly besieged Zamość, but it was relieved by Suvorov. He retreated, suffering major losses, towards Częstochowa. On July 27, pressured by Franciszka z Krasińskich, he declared he would from then on strictly adhere to orders from the Confederacy that he had previously habitually disregarded.

In October his responsibilities in the War Council were increased, and the same month he became involved with the plan to kidnap King Poniatowski. Pulaski was initially opposed to this plan but later supported it on the condition that the king would not be harmed. The attempt failed, weakening the international reputation of the Confederates. When Pulaski's involvement with the attempted kidnapping became known, the Austrians expelled him from their territories. He spent the following winter and spring in Częstochowa, during which time several of his followers were defeated, captured or killed.

On May 31, 1772, Pulaski, increasingly distanced from other leaders of the Confederation, left the Jasna Góra monastery and went to Silesia in Prussia. In the meantime, the Bar Confederation was defeated, with most fighting ending around the summer. Overall, Pulaski was seen as one of the most famous and accomplished Confederate leaders. At the same time, he often acted independently, disobeying orders from Confederate command, and among his detractors, which included Dumouriez, had a reputation of a "loose cannon". The First Partition of Poland occurred in 1772.

Leaving Prussia, Pulaski sought refuge in France, where he unsuccessfully attempted to join the French Army. In 1773, his opponents in Poland accused him of attempted regicide, and proceedings began at the Sejm Court on June 7. The Partition Sejm had been convened by the victors to validate the First Partition.

Poniatowski himself warned Pulaski to stay away from Poland, or risk death. The court verdict, declared in absentia in July, stripped Pulaski of "all dignity and honors", demanded that his possessions be confiscated, and sentenced him to death. He attempted to recreate a Confederate force in the Ottoman Empire during the Russo-Turkish War, but before he could make any progress, the Turks were defeated, and he barely escaped by sea to Marseille, France. He found himself in debt and unable to find an army that would enlist him. He spent the year of 1775 in France, imprisoned at times for debts, until his allies gathered enough funds to arrange for his release. Around that time, due to the efforts of his friend Claude-Carloman de Rulhière, he was recruited by the Marquis de Lafayette and Benjamin Franklin, whom he met in spring 1777, for service in the American Revolutionary War.

=== In the United States ===
==== Northern front ====
Franklin was impressed by Pulaski, and wrote of him: "Count Pulaski of Poland, an officer famous throughout Europe for his bravery and conduct in defence of the liberties of his country against the three great invading powers of Russia, Austria and Prussia ... may be highly useful to our service." He subsequently recommended that General George Washington accept Pulaski as a volunteer in the Continental Army cavalry. Pulaski departed France from Nantes in June, and arrived in Marblehead, Massachusetts, near Boston, on July 23, 1777. After his arrival, Pulaski wrote to Washington, "I came here, where freedom is being defended, to serve it, and to live or die for it."

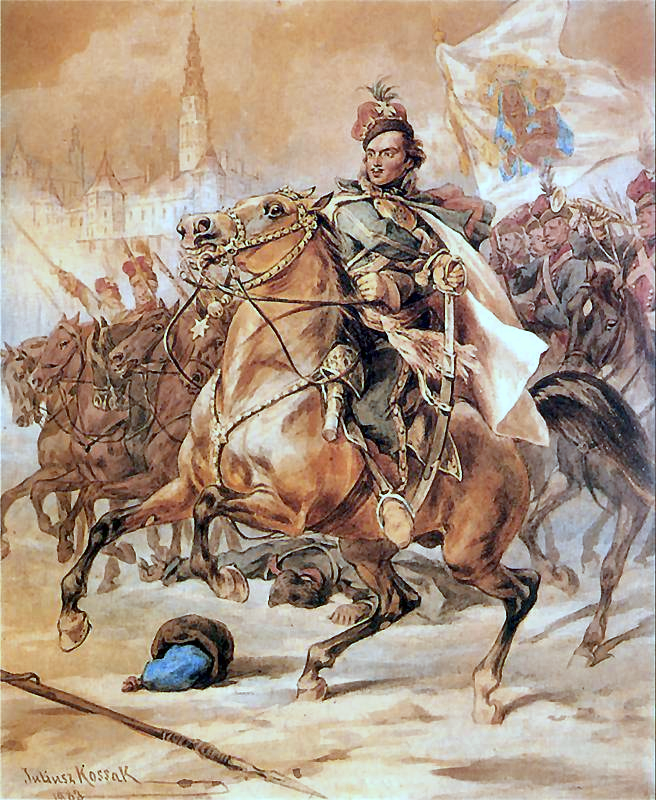
Pulaski on horseback, painting by Juliusz Kossak, 1883.

On August 20, he met Washington in his headquarters in Neshaminy Falls, outside Philadelphia. He showed off riding stunts, and argued for the superiority of cavalry over infantry. Because Washington was unable to grant him an officer rank, Pulaski spent the next few months traveling between Washington and the United States Congress in Philadelphia, awaiting his appointment. His first military engagement against the British occurred before he received it, on September 11, 1777, at the Battle of Brandywine.

When the Continental Army troops began to yield, he reconnoitered with Washington's bodyguard of about 30 men, and reported that the enemy were endeavoring to cut off the line of retreat. Washington ordered him to collect as many as possible of the scattered troops who came his way and employ them according to his discretion to secure the retreat of the army. His subsequent charge averted a disastrous defeat of the Continental Army cavalry, earning him fame in America and saving the life of George Washington.

As a result, on September 15, 1777, on the orders of Congress, Washington commissioned Pulaski a brigadier general in the Continental Army cavalry. At that point, the cavalry was only a few hundred men strong organised into four regiments. These men were scattered among numerous infantry formations, and used primarily for scouting duties. Pulaski immediately began work on reforming the cavalry, and wrote the first regulations for the formation.

On September 16, while on patrol west of Philadelphia, Pulaski spotted significant British forces moving toward the Continental position. Upon being informed by Pulaski, Washington prepared for a battle, but the encounter was interrupted by a major storm before either side was organised. On October 4, Pulaski took part in the Battle of Germantown. He spent the winter of 1777 to 1778 with most of the army at Valley Forge. Pulaski argued that the military operations should continue through the winter, but this idea was rejected by the general staff. In turn, he directed his efforts towards reorganizing the cavalry force, mostly stationed in Trenton.

While at Trenton his assistance was requested by General Anthony Wayne, whom Washington had dispatched on a foraging expedition into southern New Jersey. Wayne was in danger of encountering a much larger British force sent to oppose his movements. Pulaski and 50 cavalry rode south to Burlington, where they skirmished with British sentries on February 28. After this minor encounter the British commander, Lieutenant Colonel Thomas Stirling, was apparently convinced that he was facing a much larger force than expected, and prepared to withdraw his troops across the Delaware River into Pennsylvania at Cooper's Ferry (present-day Gloucester City). Pulaski and Wayne joined forces to attack Stirling's position on February 29 while he awaited suitable weather conditions to cross. In the resulting skirmish, which only involved a few hundred men out of the larger forces on either side, Pulaski's horse was shot out from under him and a few of his cavalry were wounded.

American officers serving under Pulaski had difficulty taking orders from a foreigner who could scarcely speak English and whose ideas of discipline and tactics differed enormously from those to which they were accustomed. This resulted in friction between the Americans and Pulaski and his fellow Polish officers. There was also discontent in the unit over delays in pay, and Pulaski's imperious personality was a regular source of discontent among his peers, superiors, and subordinates. Pulaski was also unhappy that his suggestion to create a lancer unit was denied. Despite a commendation from Wayne, these circumstances prompted Pulaski to resign his general command in March 1778, and return to Valley Forge.

Pulaski went to Yorktown, where he met with General Horatio Gates and suggested the creation of a new unit. At Gates' recommendation, Congress confirmed his previous appointment to the rank of a brigadier general, with a special title of "Commander of the Horse", and authorised the formation of a corps of 68 lancers and 200 light infantry. This corps, which became known as the Pulaski's Legion, was recruited mainly in Baltimore, where it was headquartered. By August 1778, the Pulaski's Legion numbered about 330 men, both Americans and foreigners. American Major-General Charles Lee commented on the high standards of the Legion's training. Henry Wadsworth Longfellow would later commemorate in verse the consecration of the Legion's banner. Longfellow's poem "The Hymn of the Moravian Nuns" was, however, retracted by the poet in 1857 due to its ahistorical details. Furthermore, according to the latest research it turns out that the Pulaski banner, which symbolised the legion, was inspired by the colours of the Hungarian national flag (red, white and green) in use since the early 17th century, and was created by the Moravian Lutheran Sisters according to the instructions of Michael Kovats in Bethlehem, Pennsylvania, in early 1778. The flag embedded cultural history elements reflecting the close Hungarian-Polish friendship and interstate relations back to the centuries.

The "father of the American cavalry" demanded much of his men and trained them in tested cavalry tactics. Pulaski, supported by Michael Kovats, often referred to as the co-founder of the U.S. cavalry, made great efforts to turn their cavalry into an effective force, and the improvement of the Legion's mounted arm drew high praise from the British. Pulaski used his own personal finances when money from Congress was scarce, in order to assure his forces of the finest equipment and personal safety. However, later that year a controversy arose related to the Legion's finances, and its requisitions from the local populace. His troubles with the auditors continued until his death. Pulaski complained that he received inadequate funds, was obstructed by locals and officials, and was forced to spend his own money. He was not cleared of these charges until after his death.

In the autumn Pulaski was ordered to Little Egg Harbor on the coast of southeast New Jersey, where in the engagement on October 15, known as the affair at Little Egg Harbor, the legion suffered heavy losses. During the following winter Pulaski was stationed at Minisink, at that time in northwestern New Jersey. Ordered to take part in the punitive Sullivan Expedition against the Iroquois, he was dissatisfied with this command, and intended to leave the service and return to Europe, but instead asked to be reassigned to the Southern front. On February 2, 1779, Washington instead ordered him to South Carolina.

==== Southern front ====
Pulaski arrived in Charleston on May 8, 1779, finding the city in crisis. General Benjamin Lincoln, commander of the southern army, had led most of the army toward Augusta, Georgia, in a bid to recapture Savannah, which had been captured by the British in late 1778. The British commander, Brigadier General Augustine Prevost, responded to Lincoln's move by launching a raiding expedition from Savannah across the Savannah River. The South Carolina militia fell back before the British advance, and Prevost's force followed them all the way to Charleston. Pulaski arrived just as military leaders were establishing the city's defenses.

When the British advanced on May 11, Pulaski's Legion engaged forward elements of the British force, and was badly mauled in the encounter. The Legion infantry, numbering only about 60 men before the skirmish, was virtually wiped out, and Pulaski was forced to retreat to the safety of the city's guns. Although some historians credit this action with Prevost's decision to withdraw back toward Savannah the next day, despite ongoing negotiations of a possible surrender of Charleston, that decision is more likely based on news Prevost received that Lincoln's larger force was returning to Charleston to face him, and that Prevost's troops had gone further than he had originally intended. One early historian criticised Pulaski's actions during that engagement as "ill-judged, ill-conducted, disgraceful and disastrous". The episode was of minor strategic consequence and did little to enhance the reputation of Pulaski's unit.

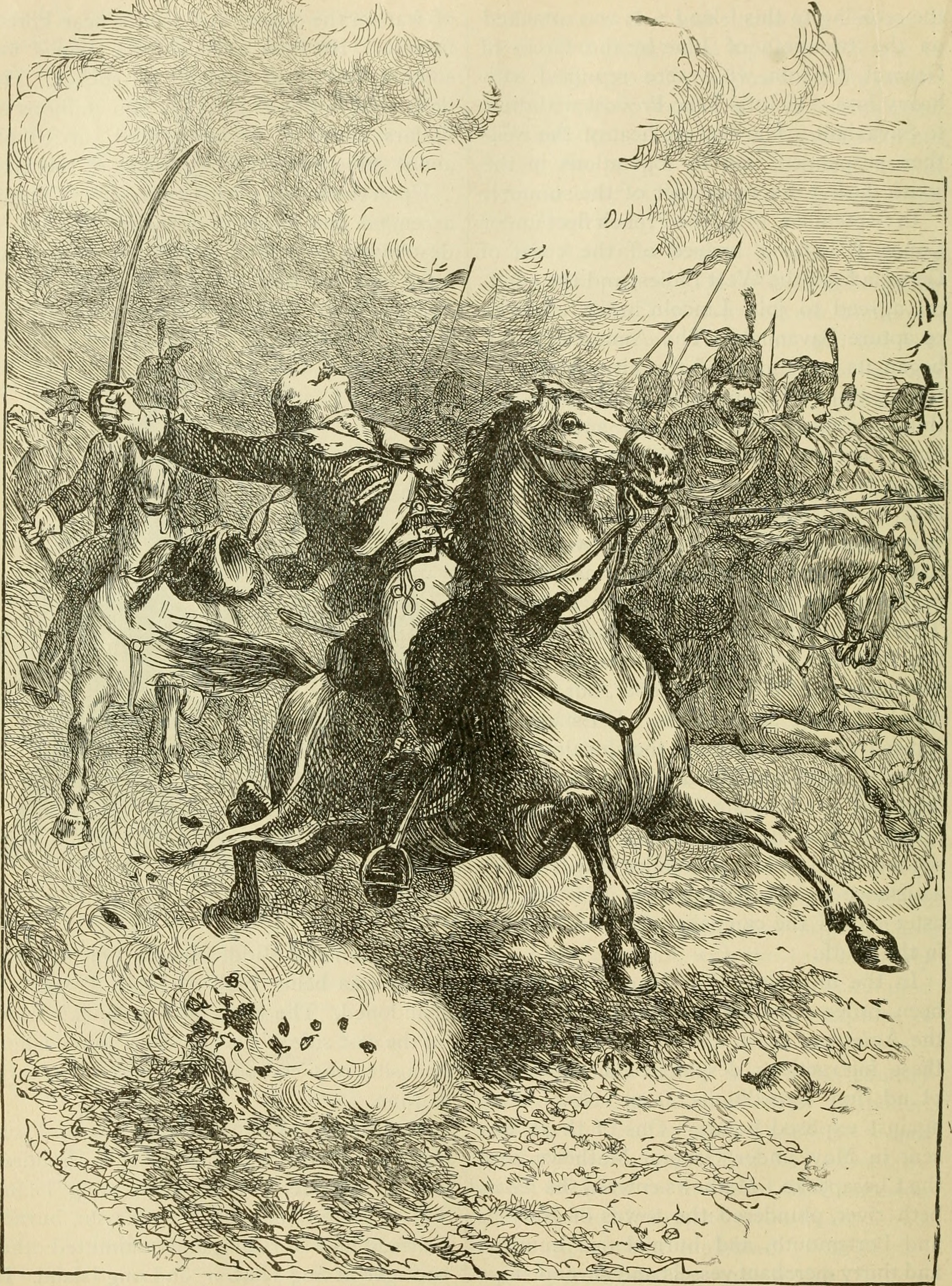
Pulaski mortally wounded by grapeshot while leading cavalry charge.

Although Pulaski frequently suffered from malaria while stationed in Charleston, he remained in active service. At the beginning of September, Lincoln prepared to launch an attempt to retake Savannah with French assistance. Pulaski was ordered to Augusta, where he was to join forces with General Lachlan McIntosh. Their combined forces were to serve as the forward elements of Lincoln's army. Pulaski captured a British outpost near Ogeechee River. His units then acted as an advance guard for the allied French units under Admiral Charles Hector, comte d'Estaing. He rendered great services during the siege of Savannah, and in the assault of October 9 commanded the whole cavalry, both French and American.

== Death and burial ==
While attempting to rally fleeing French forces during a cavalry charge, Pulaski was mortally wounded by grapeshot. The reported grapeshot is on display at the Georgia Historical Society in Savannah, Georgia. The Charleston Museum also has a grapeshot reported to be from Pulaski's wound. Pulaski was carried from the field of battle and taken aboard the South Carolina merchant brig privateer Wasp, under the command of Captain Samuel Bulfinch, where he died two days later, having never regained consciousness. His heroic death, admired by American Patriot supporters, further boosted his reputation in North America.

Pulaski never married and had no descendants. Despite his fame, there have long been uncertainties and controversies surrounding both his place and date of birth, and his burial. Many primary sources record a burial at sea. The historical accounts for Pulaski's time and place of burial vary considerably. According to several contemporary accounts there were witnesses, including Pulaski's aide-de-camp, that Pulaski received a symbolic burial in Charleston on October 21, sometime after he was buried at sea. Other witnesses, including Captain Samuel Bulfinch of the Wasp, claimed that the wounded Pulaski was actually later removed from the ship and taken to the Greenwich Plantation in the town of Thunderbolt, near Savannah, where he died and was buried under the supervision of the plantation's owner Jane Bowen, widow of Samuel.

In March 1825, during his grand tour of the United States, Lafayette personally laid the cornerstone for the Casimir Pulaski Monument in Savannah, Georgia.

=== Exhumation and analysis of remains ===
In 1853, remains found on a bluff above Augustine Creek on Greenwich Plantation were believed to be the general's. These bones were reinterred at the Casimir Pulaski Monument in Savannah, Georgia. They were exhumed in 1996 and examined during a forensic study. The eight-year examination, including DNA analysis, ended inconclusively, although the skeleton was consistent with Pulaski's age and occupation. A healed wound on the skull's forehead was consistent with historical records of an injury Pulaski sustained in battle, as was a bone defect on the left cheekbone, believed to have been caused by a benign tumor. In 2005, the remains were reinterred in a public ceremony with full military honors, including Pulaski's induction into the Georgia Military Hall of Fame.

A later study funded by the Smithsonian Institution, the results of which were released in 2019, concluded from the mitochondrial DNA of his grandniece, known injuries, and physical characteristics, that the skeleton was likely Pulaski's. The skeleton has a number of typically female features, which has led to the hypothesis that Pulaski may have been female or intersex. A documentary based on the Smithsonian study suggests that Pulaski's hypothesised intersex condition could have been caused by congenital adrenal hyperplasia, where a fetus with female chromosomes is exposed to a high level of testosterone in utero and develops partially male genitals. This analysis was based on the skeleton's female pelvis, facial structure and jaw angle, in combination with the fact that Pulaski identified as and lived as male.

However, there is no conclusive argument or evidence that Pulaski was intersex. The question remains unsettled due to the limited understanding of how an intersex condition might be revealed in the analysis of a skeleton. There is no way to prove that Pulaski was born intersex without a DNA test. (Note: The DNA needed to verify biological sex and intersex variance is usually not available from skeletal remains, due to degradation.)

In 2022, in a scholarly article, a Polish-American academic historian published a detailed account of the relevant primary sources and recounted a significant number of evidentiary problems with the historical sources and DNA evidence on which the Smithsonian documentary relied. This study suggested that the bones that led to the "intersex" conclusion were in fact not the bones of Pulaski.

== Tributes and commemoration ==
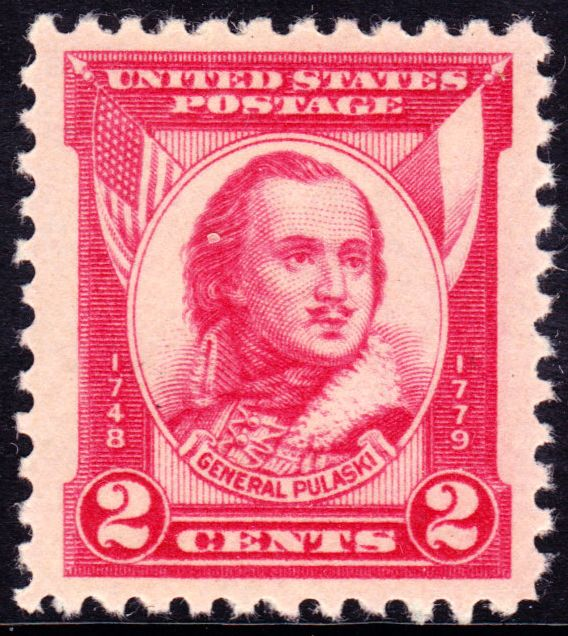
United States postage stamp featuring General Casimir Pulaski. Issue of 1931, 2 cents.

The United States has long commemorated Pulaski's contributions to the American Revolutionary War; on October 29, 1779, the United States Congress passed a resolution that a monument should be dedicated to him, but the first monument to him, the Casimir Pulaski Monument in Savannah, Georgia, was not built until 1854. A bust of Pulaski was added to a collection of other busts of American heroes at United States Capitol in 1867. On May 11, 1910, US President William Taft revealed a Congress-sponsored General Casimir Pulaski statue.

In 1929, Congress passed another resolution, this one recognizing October 11 of each year as "General Pulaski Memorial Day", with a large parade held annually on Fifth Avenue in New York City. Separately, a Casimir Pulaski Day is celebrated in Illinois and some other places on the first Monday of each March. In some Illinois school districts, the day is an official school holiday. In 1931 a ten foot tall bronze statue of Pulaski, sculpted by Polish-American sculptor Joseph Kiselewski, was erected in Pulaski Park in Milwaukee Wisconsin. 35,000 people attended the ceremony. After a previous attempt failed, Congress passed a joint resolution conferring honorary US citizenship on Pulaski in 2009, sending it to President Barack Obama for approval. He signed it on November 6, 2009, making Pulaski the seventh person so honored.

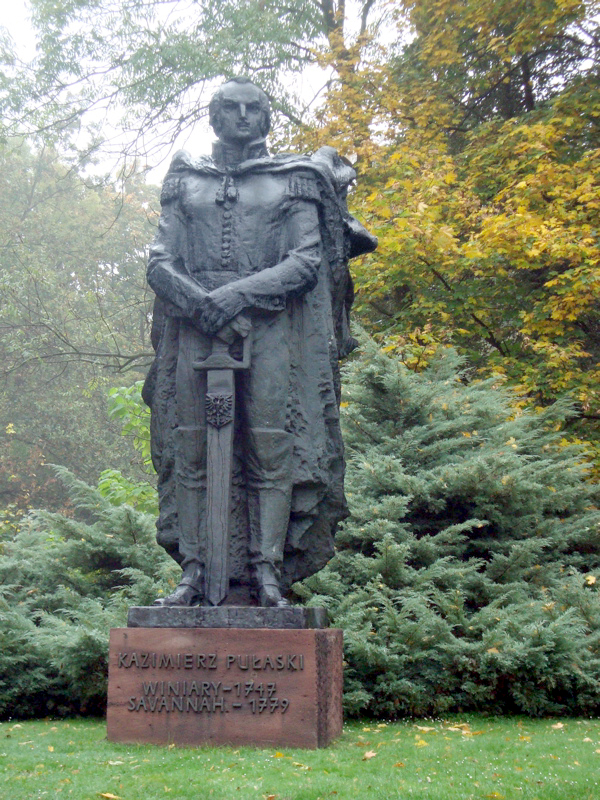
Statue of Pulaski at the Kazimierz Pułaski Museum in Warka, Poland.

In Poland, in 1793 Pulaski's relative, Antoni Pułaski, obtained a cancellation of his brother's sentence from 1773. He has been mentioned in the literary works of numerous Polish authors, including Adam Mickiewicz, Juliusz Słowacki and Józef Ignacy Kraszewski. Adolf Nowaczyński wrote a drama "Pułaski w Ameryce" (Pulaski in America) in 1917. A museum dedicated to Pulaski, the Casimir Pulaski Museum in Warka, opened in 1967.

Throughout Poland and the United States, people have celebrated anniversaries of Pulaski's birth and death, and there exist numerous objects of art such as paintings and statues of him. In 1879, to commemorate the 100th anniversary of his death, Henri Schoeller composed "A Pulaski March". Twenty years earlier, Eduard Sobolewski composed his opera, "Mohega", about the last days of Pulaski's life. Commemorative medals and stamps of Pulaski have been issued. Several cities, towns, townships and counties in United States are named after him, as are numerous streets, parks and structures.

Although his statue stands in Savannah's Monterey Square, the city's Pulaski Square is named for him.

The Pulaski Bridge in New York City links Brooklyn to Queens; the Pulaski Skyway in Northern New Jersey links Jersey City to Newark, and the Pulaski Highway traverses the city of Baltimore, Maryland.

Michigan designated US Highway 112 (now US 12) as Pulaski Memorial Highway in 1935.

There are also a number of educational, academic, and Polish-American institutions named after him. A 20th-century US Navy ballistic missile submarine, USS Casimir Pulaski, was named for him, as was, in the 19th century, a United States Revenue Cutter Service cutter, USRC Pulaski and a side-wheel steam gunboat, USS Pulaski. A Polish frigate, ORP Generał Kazimierz Pułaski, is also named after Pulaski. Fort Pulaski between Savannah and Tybee Island in Georgia, active during the American Civil War, is named in honor of Casimir Pulaski. Pulaski Barracks, an active US Army post in Kaiserslautern, Germany, is named for Casimir Pulaski in honor of the Polish people who worked for the US Army in Civilian Service Groups after WWII.

A statue commemorating Pulaski stands at the eastern end of Freedom Plaza in Washington, D.C. There is an equestrian statue of Pulaski in Roger Williams Park in Providence, Rhode Island, as well as one in the center of Pulaski park in Manchester, New Hampshire. A statue by Granville W. Carter depicting Pulaski on a rearing horse signaling a forward charge with a sword in his right hand is erected in Hartford, Connecticut. There is a Pulaski Monument in Patterson Park in Baltimore, Maryland. There is also a statue in Buffalo, NY near the intersection of Main and S. Division St. A statue of Pulaski sculpted by Sidney Waugh resides in Philadelphia, on the slope behind the Philadelphia Museum of Art in Fairmount Park.

The villages of Mt. Pulaski, Illinois, Pulaski, New York, and Pulaski, Wisconsin, are named for him, as is the city of Pulaski, Tennessee. Pulaski High School and Casimir Pulaski High School, both in Wisconsin, are also named after him, as is Pulaski Middle School in New Britain, Connecticut. Pulaski County in Virginia, Pulaski County in Arkansas, Pulaski County in Georgia, Pulaski County in Missouri, Pulaski County in Kentucky, and Pulaski County in Indiana are named after him as well.

Polish historian Władysław Konopczyński, who wrote a monograph on Pulaski in 1931, noted that he was one of the most accomplished Poles, grouping him with other Polish military heroes such as Tadeusz Kościuszko, Stanisław Żółkiewski, Stefan Czarniecki, and Prince Józef Poniatowski.

A major thoroughfare of Bellingham, Massachusetts, is named Pulaski Boulevard in honor of the general, extending from Franklin to the Rhode Island border.

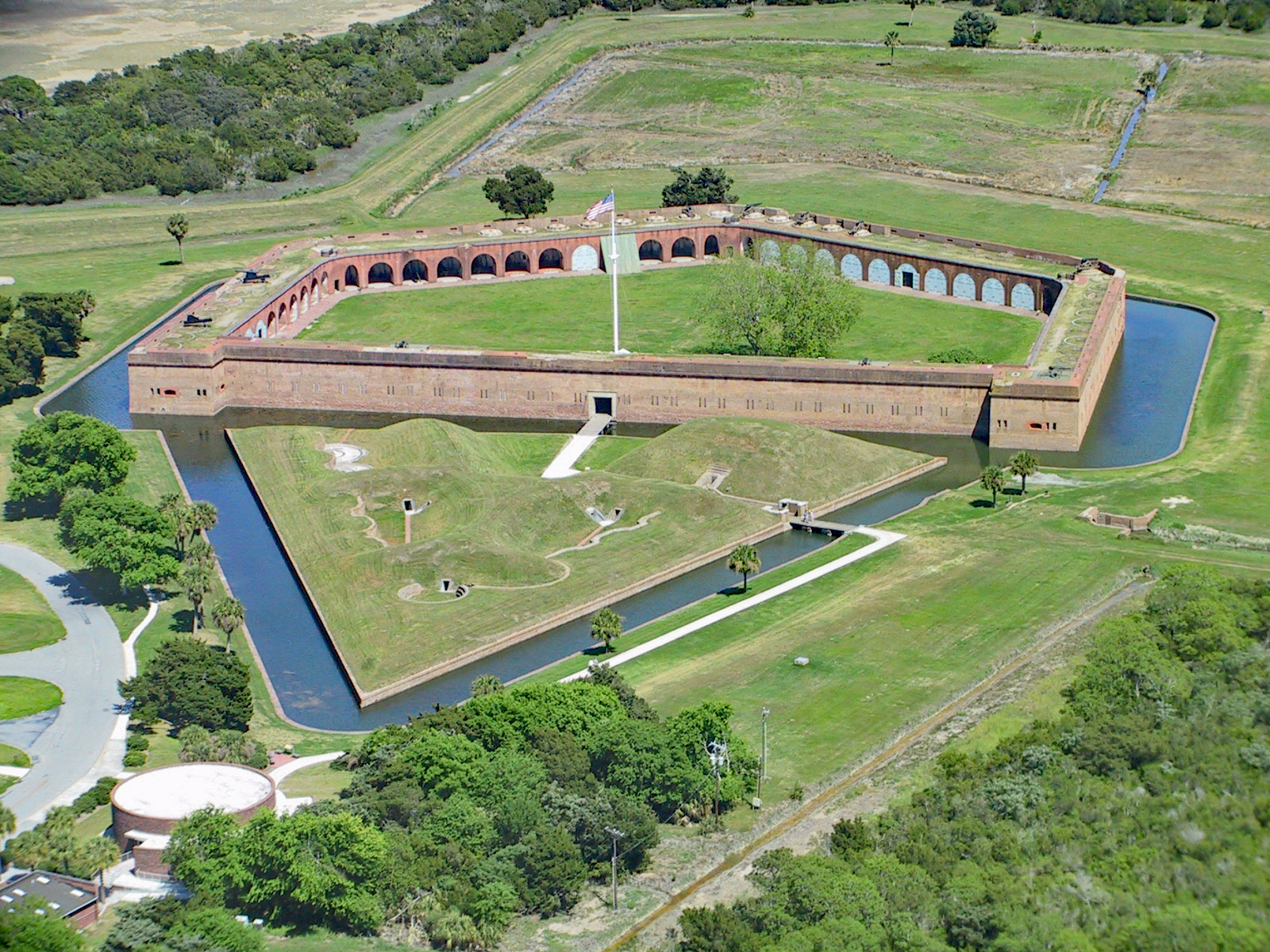
Fort Pulaski, Georgia

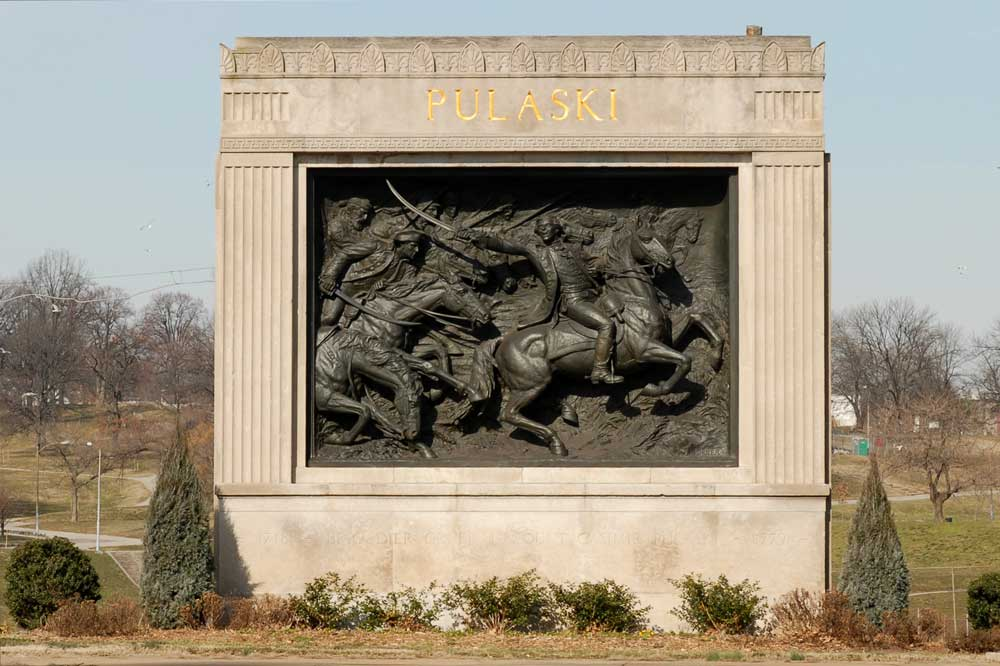
Monument in Baltimore, Maryland

== In popular culture ==
- Michigan-born songwriter Sufjan Stevens released a song called "Casimir Pulaski Day" on his album Illinois. The song interweaves his memories of a friend's battle with bone cancer with an account of the holiday.
- An account of Pulaski's death and burial is used as the background and setting for the family reunion of two POV characters in Diana Gabaldon's ninth main Outlander novel, Go Tell the Bees That I Am Gone (2021). Her historical observations and inspirations are in her author's notes.
- Chicago punk band Big Black released a song named after Casimir Pulaski, titled "Kasimir S. Pulaski Day", on their album Songs About Fucking (1987).

== See also ==
- Casimir Pulaski Foundation - leading Polish think tank specialised in foreign policy and national security
- Johann de Kalb, a Bavarian-born French officer who served as a general in the Continental Army
- The General Was Female?, documentary film about Pulaski's possible intersex status
- Intersex people and military service in the United States
- Knight of Freedom Award, an award established in honour of General Pulaski
- Michael Kovats de Fabriczy, a Hungarian nobleman and cavalry officer who served in the Continental Army
- List of Poles
- Friedrich Wilhelm von Steuben, a Prussian drill master who served in the Continental Army

== General and cited references ==
- Pastusiak, Longin (1977). Kościuszko, Pułaski i inni: o udziale Polaków w osadnictwie amerykańskim i w walce o niepodległość Stanów Zjednoczonych (in Polish). Krajowa Agencja Wydawnicza. p. 47.
- Polish Institute of Arts and Sciences in America (1943). Bulletin of the Polish Institute of Arts and Sciences in America. Polish Institute of Arts and Sciences in America. p. 451. Archived from the original on March 8, 2023.
- "The Pulaski Mystery". Poles.org. April 18, 2008. Archived from the original on September 18, 2011.
- "Casimir Pulaski – Fort Pulaski National Monument". Nps.gov. Archived from the original on July 4, 2012.
- Denslow, William R. (2004). 10,000 Famous Freemasons V3, K to P, Volume 3.
  Kessinger Publishing, prepared by the Missouri Lodge of Research. ISBN 978-1-4179-7579-2., Url
- Maciejewski, Janusz (1976). Literatura barska (in Polish). Zakład Narodowy im. Ossolińskich.
- "Marynarka Wojenna" (in Polish). Mw.mil.pl. Archived from the original on October 1, 2017.
- Nelson, Paul David (1985). Anthony Wayne: Soldier of the Early Republic. Bloomington, Indiana: Indiana University Press. pp. 73–74. ISBN 978-0-253-30751-4. OCLC 11518827.
- "Casimir Pulaski Polish and American Hero. Project of documentary film by Jolanta Kessler-Chojecka" (PDF). American Council for Polish Culture. Archived (PDF) from the original on May 27, 2014.
- Szczygielski, Wacław (1986). "Pułaski Kazimierz". Polski Słownik Biograficzny, Tom XXIX (in Polish). Zakład Narodowy Imenia Ossolińskich I Wydawnictwo Polskieh Akademii Nauk. p. 386. ISBN 83-04-00148-9.
- "Pulaski Day". Castle.eiu.edu. Archived from the original on July 22, 2012.
- "Pulaski's Grand Burial in Savannah". Poles.org. Archived from the original on January 1, 2012.
- Stanley S. Sokol; Sharon F. Mrotek Kissane; Alfred L. Abramowicz (January 1, 1992). The Polish Biographical Dictionary: Profiles of Nearly 900 Poles Who Have Made Lasting Contributions to World Civilization. Bolchazy-Carducci Publishers. p. 327. ISBN 978-0-86516-245-7.
- Stone, Daniel (2001). The Polish-Lithuanian State, 1386–1795. University of Washington Press. ISBN 978-0-295-98093-5. Archived from the original on February 6, 2023.
- Storozynski, Alex (August 3, 2010). The Peasant Prince: Thaddeus Kosciuszko and the Age of Revolution. Macmillan. p. 23. ISBN 978-0-312-62594-8.
- Griffin, Martin (1907). Catholics and the American Revolution. Ridley Park, Pennsylvania: self-published, 385 pages.
- McGuire, Thomas (2006). Battle of Paoli. Mechanicsburg, Pennsylvania: Stackpole Books. pp. 31–36. ISBN 978-0-8117-3337-3.
- Russell, David Lee (2000). The American Revolution in the Southern Colonies. Jefferson, North Carolina: McFarland. p. 106. ISBN 978-0-7864-0783-5. OCLC 248087936.
- Russell, David Lee (2000). The American Revolution in the Southern Colonies. Jefferson, North Carolina: McFarland. p. 107. ISBN 978-0-7864-0783-5. OCLC 248087936.
- Wilson, David K (2005). The Southern Strategy: Britain's Conquest of South Carolina and Georgia, 1775–1780. Columbia, South Carolina: University of South Carolina Press. pp. 101–102. ISBN 1-57003-573-3. OCLC 232001108.
- Szymański, Leszek (1979). Kazimierz Pulaski in America: A Monograph, 1777–1779. Contra Publishers.
- Wilson, David K (2005). The Southern Strategy: Britain's Conquest of South Carolina and Georgia, 1775–1780. Columbia, South Carolina: University of South Carolina Press. p. 103. ISBN 1-57003-573-3. OCLC 232001108.
- Wilson, David K (2005). The Southern Strategy: Britain's Conquest of South Carolina and Georgia, 1775–1780. Columbia, South Carolina: University of South Carolina Press. pp. 107–108. ISBN 1-57003-573-3. OCLC 232001108.
- Wilson, David K (2005). The Southern Strategy: Britain's Conquest of South Carolina and Georgia, 1775–1780. Columbia, South Carolina: University of South Carolina Press. p. 108. ISBN 1-57003-573-3. OCLC 232001108.
- Jones, Charles Colcock (1883). The history of Georgia: Revolutionary epoch. Vol. 2. Houghton, Mifflin and Co., 540 pages.
- Wilson, James Grant; Fiske, John (1898). Pulaski, Casimir. Appletons' Cyclopaedia of American Biography: Pickering-Sumter. Archived from the original on March 8, 2023.
- "Casimir Pulaski Birthday Commemoration. The Real Date of Casimir Pulaski's Birth" (PDF). Poles in America Foundation. March 6, 2012. Archived (PDF) from the original on September 19, 2015.
- Pinkowski, Edward (February 1996). "General Pulaski's Age. Baptism Record Verifies Historian's Hunch". Polish American Journal. Archived from the original on December 23, 2014.
- Pub. L. 111–94 (text) (PDF) Proclaiming Casimir Pulaski to be an honorary citizen of the United States.
- Makarewicz, Father Stanislaw (1998). "The Four Birth Records of Kazimierz Pulaski". Archiwa, Biblioteki i Muzea Koscielne. 70. translated by Peter Obst and Alexandra Medvec. The Catholic University of Lublin (KUL). Archived from the original on November 11, 2020.
- Seidner, Stanley S. (1976). In Quest of a Cultural Identity: An Inquiry for the Polish Community (Report). New York: IUME, Teachers College, Columbia University. ERIC ED167674. Archived from the original on April 26, 2012.
- "Kazimierz Pulaski Granted U.S. Citizenship Posthumously (11 March 2009) – U.S. Diplomatic Mission to Warsaw, Poland". U. S. Department of State. March 11, 2009. Archived from the original on May 29, 2010.
- "Casimir Pulaski Museum in Warka". Casimir Pulaski Museum in Warka. Archived from the original on February 23, 2017.
- Presidential Studies Quarterly Vol. XXIV No. 4 Fall 1994, pp. 876–77
- Mann, William C. (November 10, 2009). "Revolutionary War hero becomes honorary US citizen". The Seattle Times.
- William Scudder Stryker; Society of the Cincinnati in the State of New Jersey (1894). The affair at Egg Harbor, New Jersey, October 15, 1778. Naar, Day & Naar.
- "Pulaski, 1825; U.S. Coast Guard" (PDF). U. S. Coast Guard Historian's Office. Archived (PDF) from the original on September 27, 2012.
- "Hartford War Memorials" (PDF). Archived from the original (PDF) on April 2, 2015.
- Kajencki, Annmarie Francis (2005). Count Casimir Pulaski: From Poland to America, A Hero's Fight for Liberty. New York: The Rosen Publishing Group. ISBN 978-1-4042-2646-3. Url
- "WASP". American War of Independence – At Sea. Archived from the original on February 8, 2017.
- Pinkowski, Edward (1997). "General Pulaski's Body". Pulaski Museum in Warka, Poland. Archived from the original on October 4, 2013.
