= Commemoration of Casimir Pulaski =

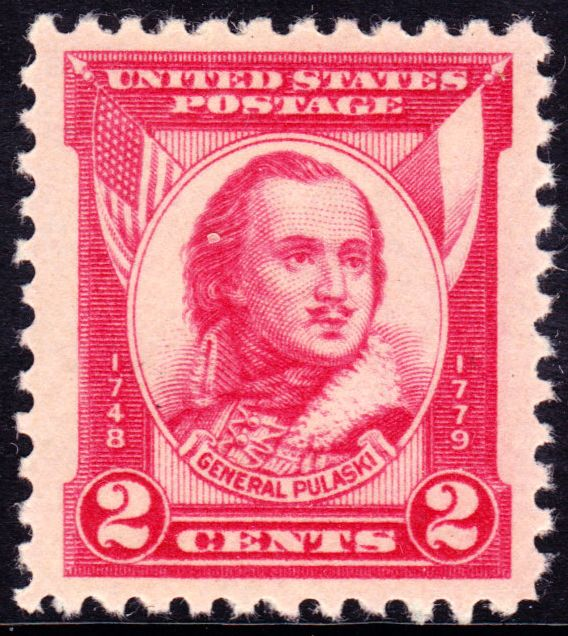
General Casimir Pulaski 1931 Commemorative Issue, 2c

Casimir Pulaski ( March 6, 1745 – October 11, 1779) was a Polish nobleman, soldier and military commander who has been called "the father of the American cavalry". He has had hundreds of monuments, memorial plaques, streets, parks and similar objects named after him.

== Places ==
Cities and towns

- Pulaski, Tennessee
- Pulaski, Iowa
- Pulaski, Illinois
- Mount Pulaski, Illinois
- Pulaski, Mississippi
- Pulaski, Wisconsin
- Pulaski, New York

Counties

- Pulaski County, Arkansas
- Pulaski County, Georgia
- Pulaski County, Illinois
- Pulaski County, Indiana
- Pulaski County, Kentucky
- Pulaski County, Missouri
- Pulaski County, Virginia

== Parks ==
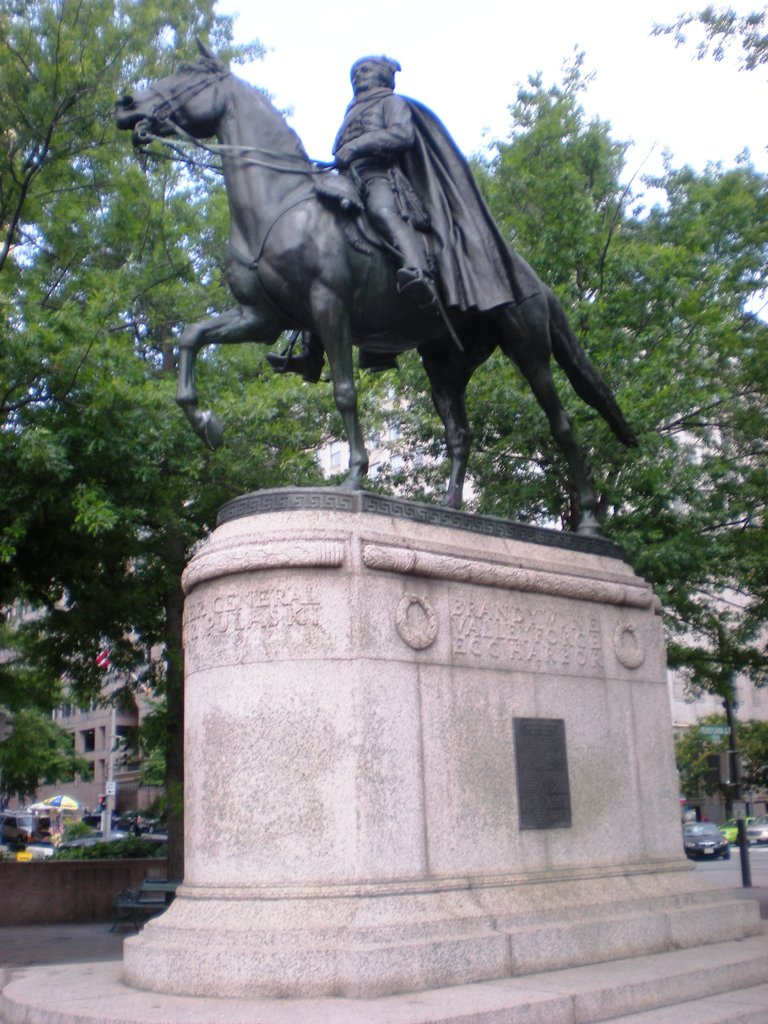
General Casimir Pulaski

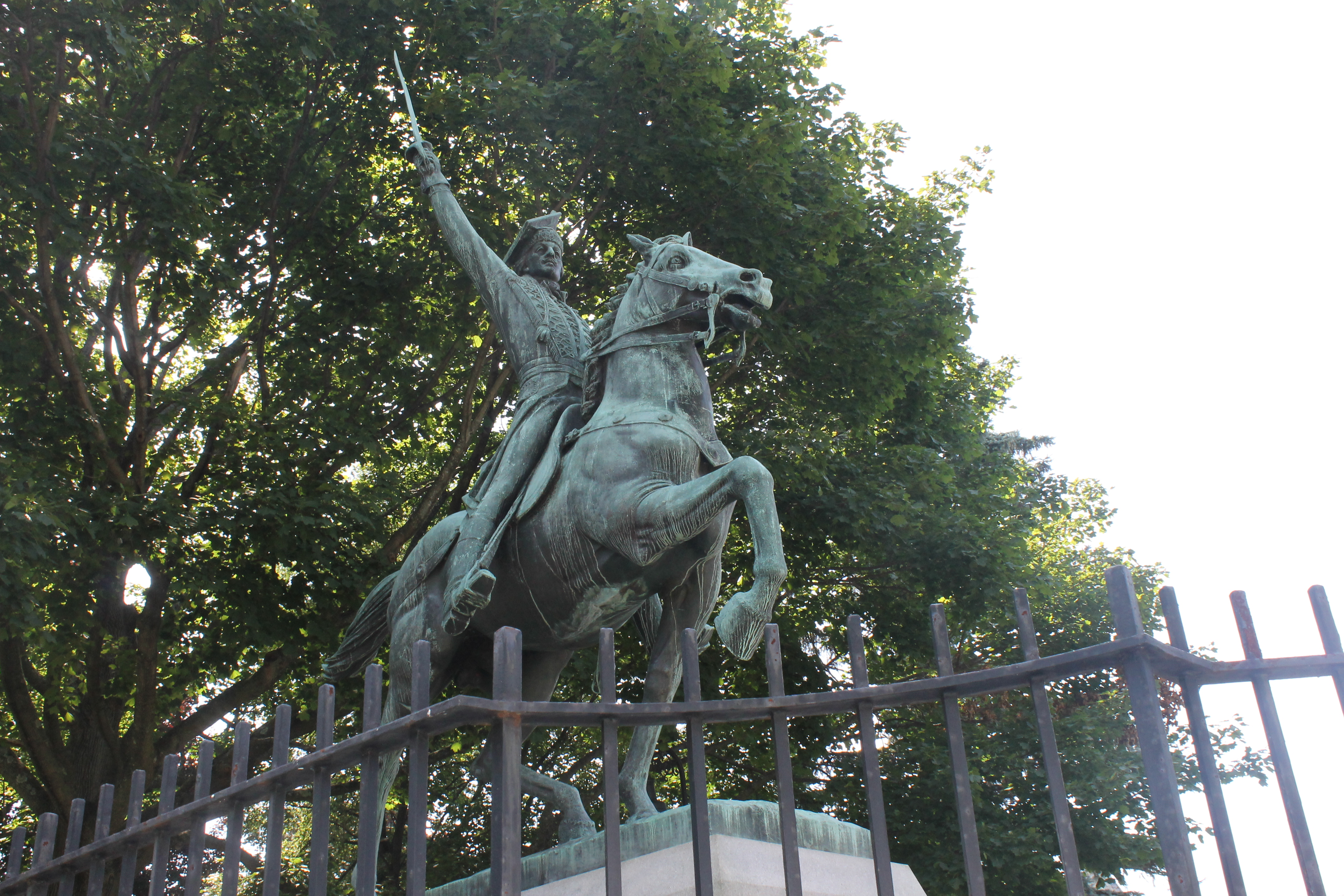
Pulaski equestrian statue at Pulaski Park in Manchester, New Hampshire

Pulaski Park in Northampton, Massachusetts
Sits on Main Street between City Hall and the historic Academy of Music Theater. Northampton and the surrounding area are home to many Polish-American immigrants and their descendants.
Pulaski Park in Holyoke, Massachusetts
City park along the Connecticut River.
Pulaski Park in Manchester, New Hampshire
Located at the corner of Union and Bridge streets, is home to equestrian statue of Pulaski.
Casimir Pulaski Memorial Park in Chepachet, Rhode Island
Lies within the 4,000 acres (16 km^{2}) George Washington Management Area. The 100 acres (400,000 m^{2}) park features the 13 acres (53,000 m^{2}) Peck Pond, hiking, and cross-country skiing, and general recreation facilities.
Pulaski Park in Hammond, Indiana
Located in the north part of Hammond, twp blocks square between Sheffield Avenue and Grover Avenue, and 137th and 139th Streets.
Pulaski Park in Milwaukee, Wisconsin
sits along 20th Street, between Cleveland and Oklahoma Avenues.
Pulaski Park in Philadelphia, Pennsylvania
Located along the Delaware River, adjacent to the Polish neighborhood of Port Richmond.
Pulaski Park in Fall River, Massachusetts
A monument was erected in 1931, and a new flagpole and sign were dedicated in 2017
Pulaski Park in Chicago, Illinois
Located in the West Town neighborhood in Chicago adjacent to Interstate 90 and listed on the National Register of Historic Places in 1981.

== Roadways and bridges ==
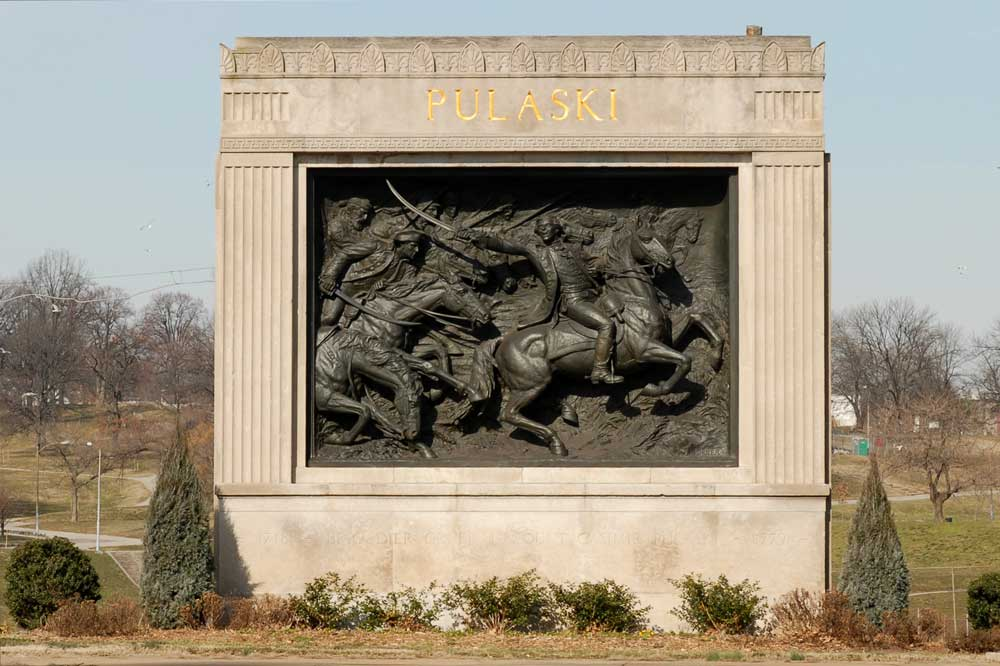
Pulaski Memorial in Patterson Park, Baltimore, Maryland

Pulaski Skyway
A 3.5-mile series of bridges between Jersey City and Newark, New Jersey that connects to the Holland Tunnel, opened in 1932.
Pulaski Skyway
Part of Interstate 93 in Boston, Massachusetts.
Casimir Pulaski Highway
North-South Arterial, part of Routes 5, 8 and 12 in Utica, New York. There is also a statue of him on Utica's Memorial Parkway.
Pulaski Bridge
Connects the neighborhoods of Greenpoint, Brooklyn and Long Island City, Queens. Greenpoint is one of the largest Polonias in America.
Pulaski Boulevard
Home to a monument to Pulaski, located in Pulaski's Village, a development of the Mystic Islands in Little Egg Harbor, New Jersey, the location of the Little Egg Harbor massacre. The monument is the starting point for the town's Memorial Day celebration and parade.
Pulaski Road
A major north–south road in Chicago, Illinois.
Pulaski Avenue
Runs through Germantown, Philadelphia, the site of the Battle of Germantown in which Pulaski participated.
Casimir Pulaski Memorial Highway
Interstate 65 through Lake County, Indiana.
Pulaski Highway
U.S. Route 40 from Midvale, Delaware, to Baltimore, Maryland. The latter's Patterson Park also contains a monument to Pulaski.
General Casimir Pulaski Way
NW 22nd Avenue in Miami, Florida.

Other streets

- Riverhead, New York
- Pine Island, New York
- Huntington, New York
- Brooklyn, New York
- Hamtramck, Michigan
- Lansing, Michigan
- Calumet City, Illinois
- Bellingham, Massachusetts
- South Bend, Indiana
- Columbia, South Carolina
- Athens, Georgia
- Toledo, Ohio
- Peabody, Massachusetts

== Holidays ==
General Pulaski Memorial Day
Celebrated on October 11. The United States has long commemorated Pulaski's contributions to the American War of Independence, but Polish immigration in the 20th century heightened the interest. In 1929, Congress passed a resolution creating this holiday dedicated to Pulaski's memory and to the heritage of Polish-Americans. In New York City, the first Sunday of October sees the Pulaski Day Parade on Fifth Avenue.
Casimir Pulaski Day
Celebrated predominantly in Chicago, Illinois since 1977 on the first Monday of March, when all state government buildings are closed. School districts have the option of observing Pulaski Day as a holiday.
Pulaski Day
A mid-July holiday in Buffalo, New York, whose population consists of many Polish immigrants and their descendants, comprising an annual parade.
Pulaski Days
A three-day celebration in Grand Rapids, Michigan on the first full weekend in October, in which the city's private Polish halls open their doors to the public. Most of the halls involved (14 total in the Grand Rapids area) were established in the mid-to-late 19th century. They use this event as a fund raiser to maintain their non-profit organizations. The celebration of Polish heritage draws attendance from throughout Michigan as well as other areas of the country with populations of Polish origin.

== Monuments ==
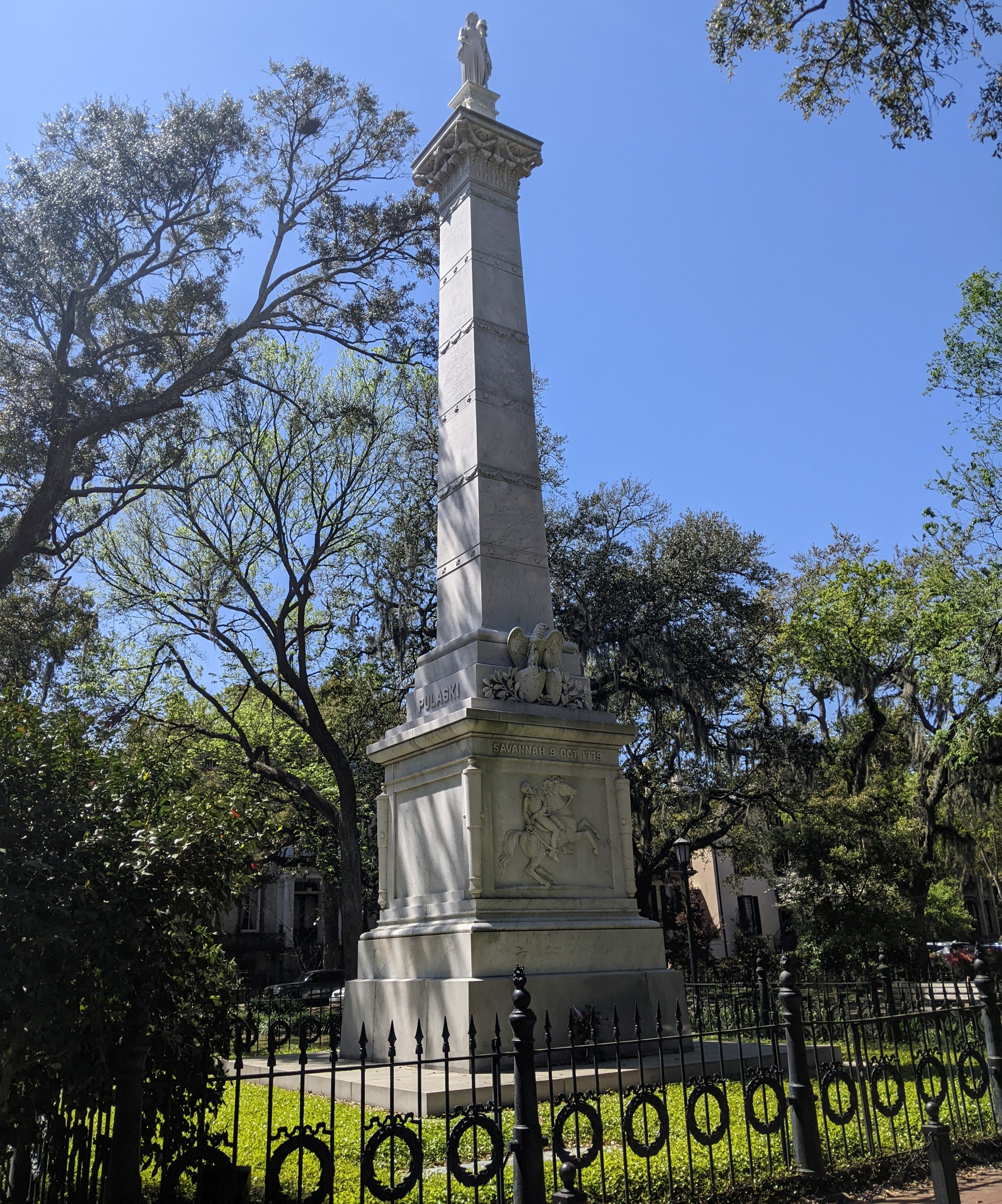
Pulaski monument in Savannah, Georgia

Pulaski statue in Flint, Michigan.

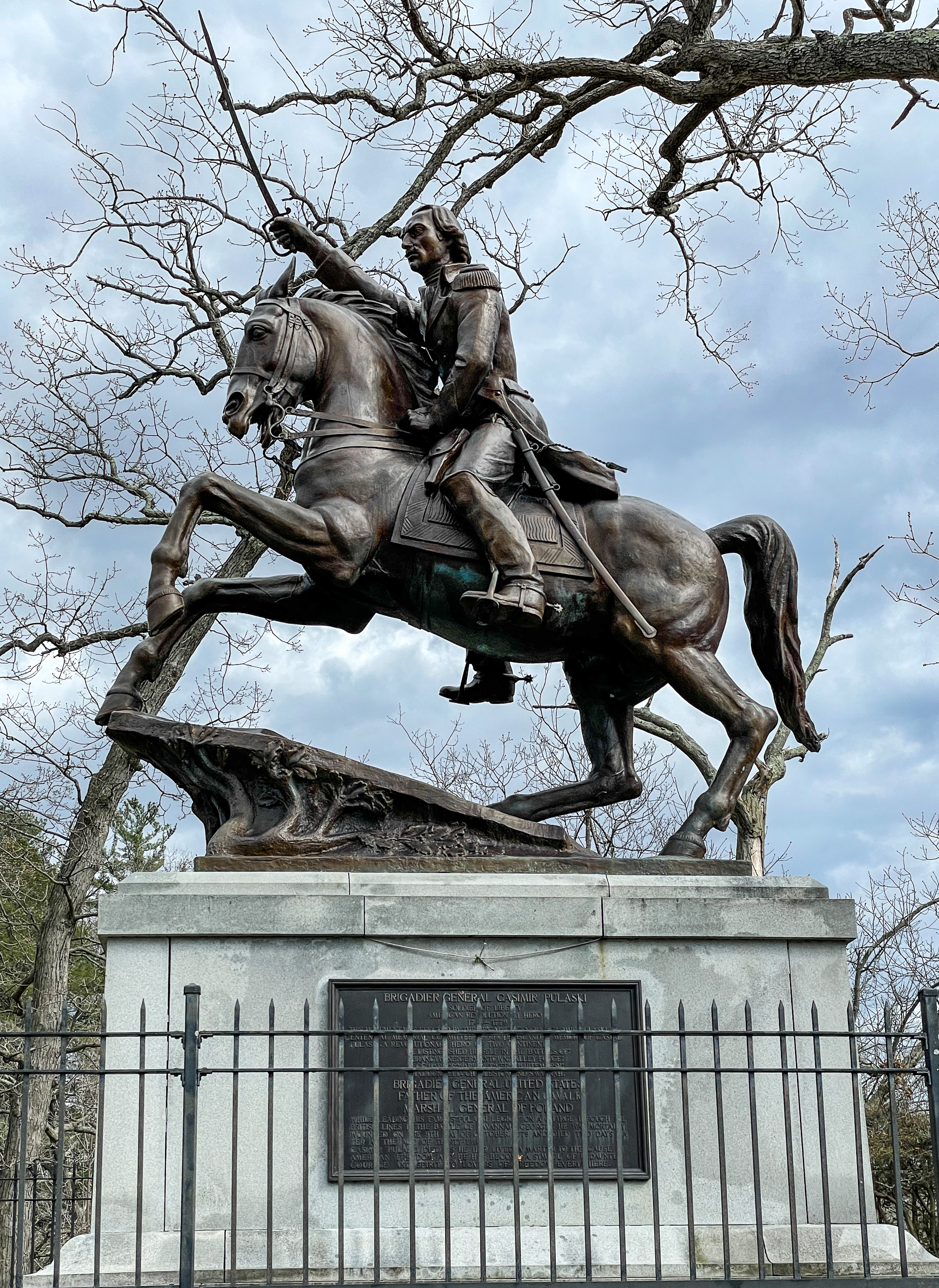
Statue in Providence, Rhode Island

- Casimir Pulaski Monument in Savannah, Georgia.
- Pulaski Square, also in Savannah, Georgia.
- Fort Pulaski National Monument on Cockspur Island between Savannah and Tybee Island, Georgia, which was active during the American Civil War.
- General Casimir Pulaski statue in Freedom Plaza, Washington, D.C., located at Pennsylvania Avenue, between 13th and 14th Streets. Dedicated on May 11, 1910.
- General Casmir Pulaski statue located in the Lackawanna County Courthouse square in Scranton, Pennsylvania.
- A monument commemorating Pulaski and The Affair at Little Egg Harbor in Little Egg Harbor Township, New Jersey near the site of the massacre along the street named for him.
- A statue in McGlachlin Park, Stevens Point, Wisconsin
- Pulaski Square, erected in 1937 on The Mall, adjacent Cleveland Browns Stadium in downtown Cleveland, Ohio, was built by the Polish Legion of American Veterans and the city's Polish community.
- A statue in Hartford, Connecticut, at Main Street and Capitol Avenue.
- Two monuments in Buffalo, New York, one located at the corner of Church Street and Main, the other at Main and South Division Streets.
- A monument from 1931 in Milwaukee, Wisconsin.
- A monument in Patterson Park of Baltimore, Maryland.
- An equestrian statue in Roger Williams Park in Providence, Rhode Island by Guido Nincheri, erected on the bicentennial of his birth in 1953.
- A statue in Riverbank Park in Flint, Michigan, erected on the 1979 bicentennial of his death.
- A statue in Detroit, Michigan, at the intersection of Washington Boulevard and Michigan Avenue.
- A statue in Riverfront Park in Garfield, New Jersey, built in 2014 by Brian Hanlon.
- A Square named "Gen. Casimir Pulaski Square" is in Boston at the intersection of Power St and Boston St with a small park next to it. In the park sits a stone block with a message on it. There is a bust of him on top of it. An American flag sits on his right and an inter-war period Polish flag on his left.

== Military ==
- On November 17, 1779, General George Washington issued a challenge-and-password (used to identify friend and foe when crossing military lines), which was perhaps the first commemorations of Pulaski. The query was "Pulaski", and the response "Poland".
- USS Pulaski, a side-wheel steamship, in service with the United States Navy
- USS Pulaski County (LST-1088), a LST-1081-class tank landing ship of the United States Navy.
- USS Casimir Pulaski, a James Madison-class ballistic missile submarine of the United States Navy.
- USCGC Pulaski (WSC-149), a 19th-century Revenue Marine (United States Coast Guard) cutter.
- ORP Gen. K. Pułaski (formerly USS Clark (FFG-11)), a ship of the Polish Navy.

== Schools ==
- There is a technical university in Poland known as Kazimierz Pułaski Technical University of Radom.
- Also, there are Casimir Pulaski elementary schools in Chicago, Illinois, Detroit, Michigan, New Bedford, Massachusetts, Wilmington, Delaware, Meriden, Connecticut, and Yonkers, New York, Casimir Pulaski High School in Milwaukee, Pulaski High School in Pulaski, Wisconsin, Pulaski Middle School (formerly Pulaski Senior High School) in New Britain, Connecticut, North Pulaski High School in Jacksonville, Arkansas and an industrial park is named for him in nearby Wallingford, Connecticut. Within the Savannah College of Art and Design in Savannah, Georgia, Pulaski House is the name for a student residential building.
- University of Arkansas - Pulaski Technical College located in Pulaski County, Arkansas.
- Pulaski Academy in Little Rock, Arkansas is one of the top college preparatory schools in the United States, educating children from Pre-K 3 through 12th grade.
- There is a Pulaski K-8 school located near Hunter Army Airfield located in Savannah, Georgia.

== Miscellaneous ==
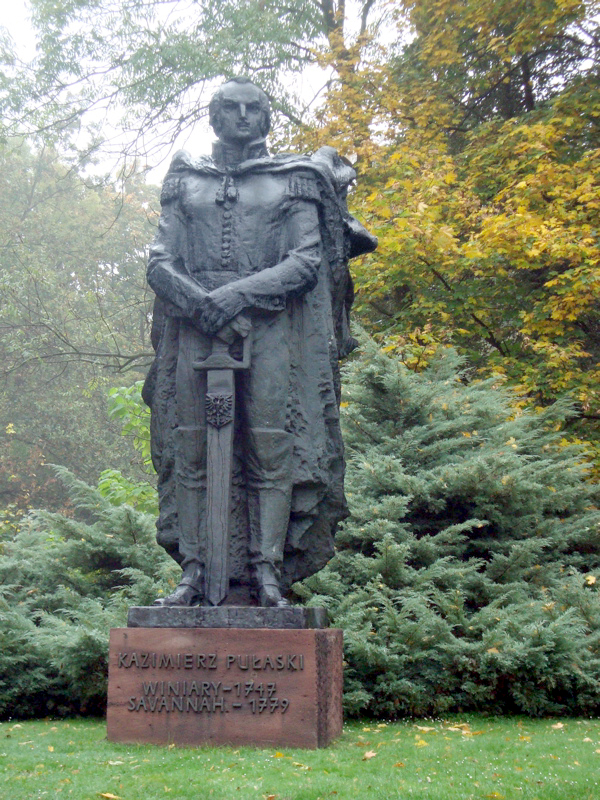
Statue at the Kazimierz Pułaski Museum in Warka, Poland.

- Although there are several disputed birth and baptismal records, Pulaski's birth is honored in Warka, Poland, by the Kazimierz Pułaski Museum, which opened in 1967. The museum occupies the manor house which Pulaski's family lived in during the 1760s, and includes rooms dedicated to his activities in Poland and the United States. It also includes rooms dedicated to Polish-American emigration and contributions of Polish émigrés to American culture and history.
- After a previous attempt failed, the United States Congress passed a joint resolution conferring honorary citizenship on Pulaski in 2009, sending it to the President for approval. President Barack Obama signed the bill on November 6, 2009, making Pulaski the seventh person so honored.
- Detroit folk singer Sufjan Stevens featured a track called "Casimir Pulaski Day" on his 2005 album Illinois.
- Chicago punk band Big Black featured a track called "Kasimir S. Pulaski Day" on their 1987 album Songs About Fucking.
- Maryland hard rock band Clutch recorded a track titled "Pulaski Skyway" for their 2005 album Robot Hive/Exodus.
- A special millennial tribute to Pulaski was staged in the year 2000 involving a large party in Chicago's Grant Park. Featured live were DJ Food and a varied dance setlist, including artists such as Two Hours Traffic alongside Snoop Dogg and Moby. This was followed by a multimedia presentation on Pulaski's life and accomplishments set to orchestral music performed by the Chicago Symphony Orchestra and specially composed for the occasion by Yanni.
