= Affair at Little Egg Harbor =

Engagement of the American Revolutionary War and massacre

Little Egg Harbor massacre
- Part of the American Revolutionary War
Date	October 15, 1778
Location	near Little Egg Harbor, present-day Tuckerton, New Jersey 39.572°N 74.356°W
Result	British victory

Belligerents
United States	Great Britain

Commanders and leaders
Kazimierz Pułaski	Patrick Ferguson

Strength
50	250

Casualties and losses
45 killed 5 captured	3 killed 3 wounded

The Affair at Little Egg Harbor took place on October 15, 1778, in South Jersey during the American Revolutionary War. American Loyalists commanded by Patrick Ferguson surprised an outpost of Patriot Kazimierz Pułaski‘s Legion at night, killing 45 and capturing 5. The raid took place about one week after the Battle of Chestnut Neck, a British raid aimed at suppressing privateers who used the area as a base to harass and seize British ships and their cargoes.

== Background ==
British Army officer Captain Patrick Ferguson led a raid on Chestnut Neck, on the Mullica River, to retrieve supplies taken by privateers and try to stop their use of the town as a base for the distribution of their prizes and shipment of captured goods to General Washington at Valley Forge.

Kazimierz Pułaski and his newly raised forces were ordered to oppose his actions. Pulaski's Legion, along with three companies of light infantry, three troops of light horse, and one artillery detachment, arrived the day after Ferguson departed Chestnut Neck. The legion's arrival did not stop Ferguson from raiding an iron works at Batsto. The plan was to attack Batsto, but the river proved too shallow, and they stemmed their attacks on privateers at The Forks of the Mullica River.

== Attack ==
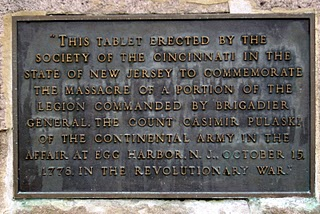
Massacre plaque

For a week the two forces were at a standoff. Pulaski's troops reached the Little Egg Harbor district (near present-day Tuckerton), and immediately set up camp on a farm.

Lt. Gustav Juliet, a deserter, found Ferguson and told him of Pulaski's encampment; he mentioned that morale was fairly low, and security almost nonexistent. Ferguson promptly loaded 250 of his best men onto boats and rowed them, in the dark, some 10 mi (16 km) to what is now Osborne Island. He marched them 2 mi (3.2 km) to the site of the infantry outpost, which consisted of fifty men a short distance from the main encampment. At first light, Ferguson ordered the attack; he took only five prisoners and his men, who were American Loyalists killed nearly 50 men.

Pulaski eventually led up his mounted troops, causing Ferguson to retreat to his boats, and leaving a few men who had fallen into the Patriot colonists' hands.

== Legacy ==
- The farm land which was the site of the massacre has been developed as the Country Club Estates; a small parcel of the colonial farm was preserved on a plot of land between Hollybrook Drive and Cedarbrook Lane.
- The Pulaski Monument is located on Pulaski Blvd in the Mystic Island section of Little Egg Harbor.

== See also ==
- American Revolutionary War § Stalemate in the North. Places 'Affair at Little Egg Harbor' in overall sequence and strategic context.
