= Pulaski Day Parade =

Annual parade in New York City, US

Pulaski Day Parade NYC
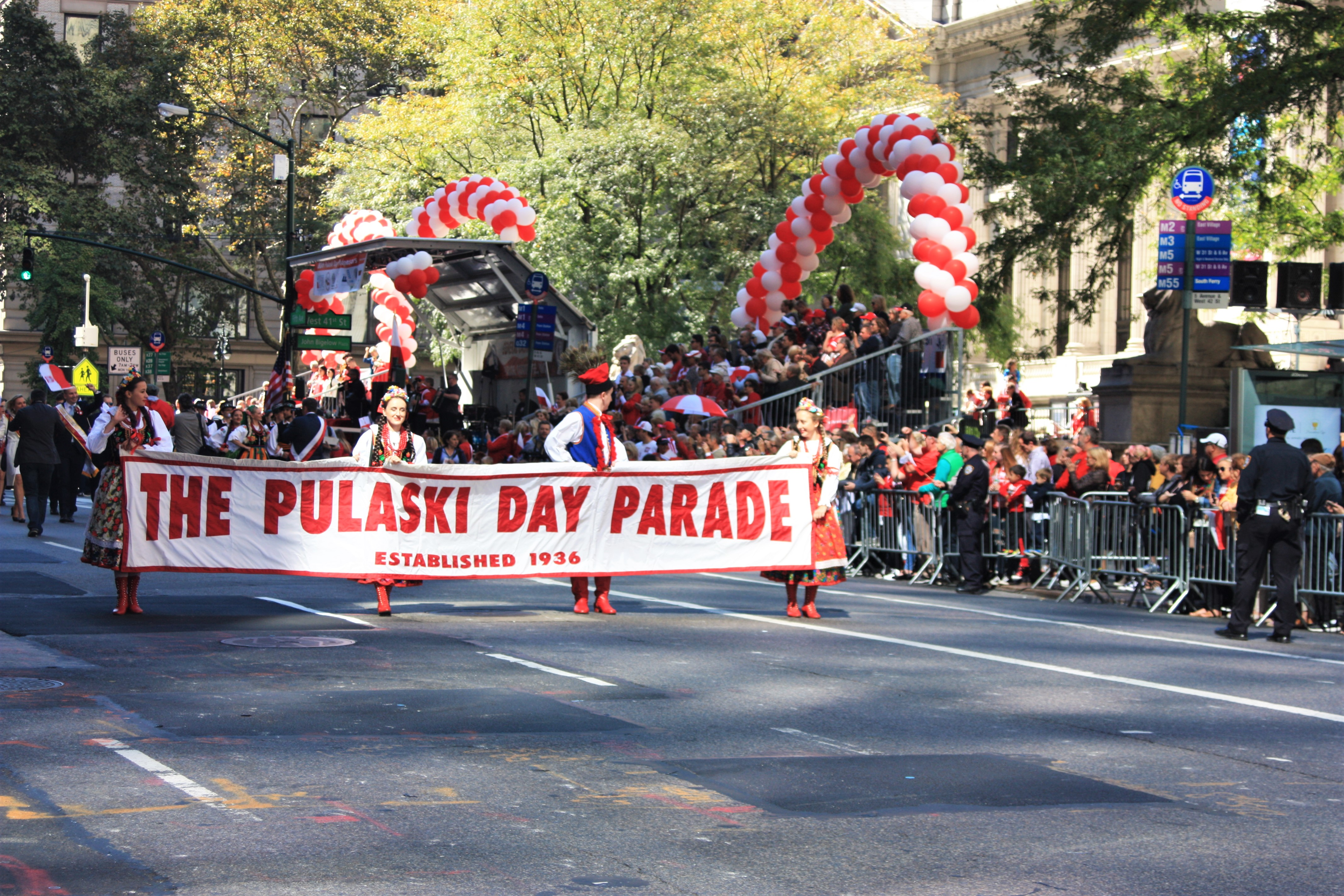
- 80th Pulaski Day Parade, October 1, 2017.
- Official name: Pulaski Day Parade
- Observed by: New York City
- Type: Ethnic, National, Anniversary
- Begins: 12:30 EST
- Ends: 4:00 EST
- Date: First Sunday in October
- 2025 date: October 5
- 2026 date: October 4
- 2027 date: October 3
- 2028 date: October 1
- Related to: General Pulaski Memorial Day

The Pulaski Day Parade (Polish: Parada Pułaskiego) is a parade held annually since 1937 on Fifth Avenue in New York City to commemorate Casimir Pulaski, a Polish hero of the American Revolutionary War. The parade runs from 35th to 54th Streets passing by St. Patrick's Cathedral. It is held on the first Sunday of October and closely coincides with the October 11th General Pulaski Memorial Day, a national observance of his death at the Siege of Savannah. The parade features Polish dancers, Polish Supplementary schools and organizations, Polish soccer teams and their mascots, scouts of the Polish Scouting and Guiding Association, and Polish Government ambassadors and representatives.

The Parade was first held in 1937. Its founder was Francis J. Wazeter, president of the Downstate New York division of the Polish American Congress. There was no parade in 1942 nor 2020.

It is one of the oldest ethnic parades in NYC.

== See also ==
- Casimir Pulaski Day, a holiday celebrated in the Midwestern U.S. commemorating Pulaski's March 4 birthday
