= General Pulaski Memorial Day =

American public holiday

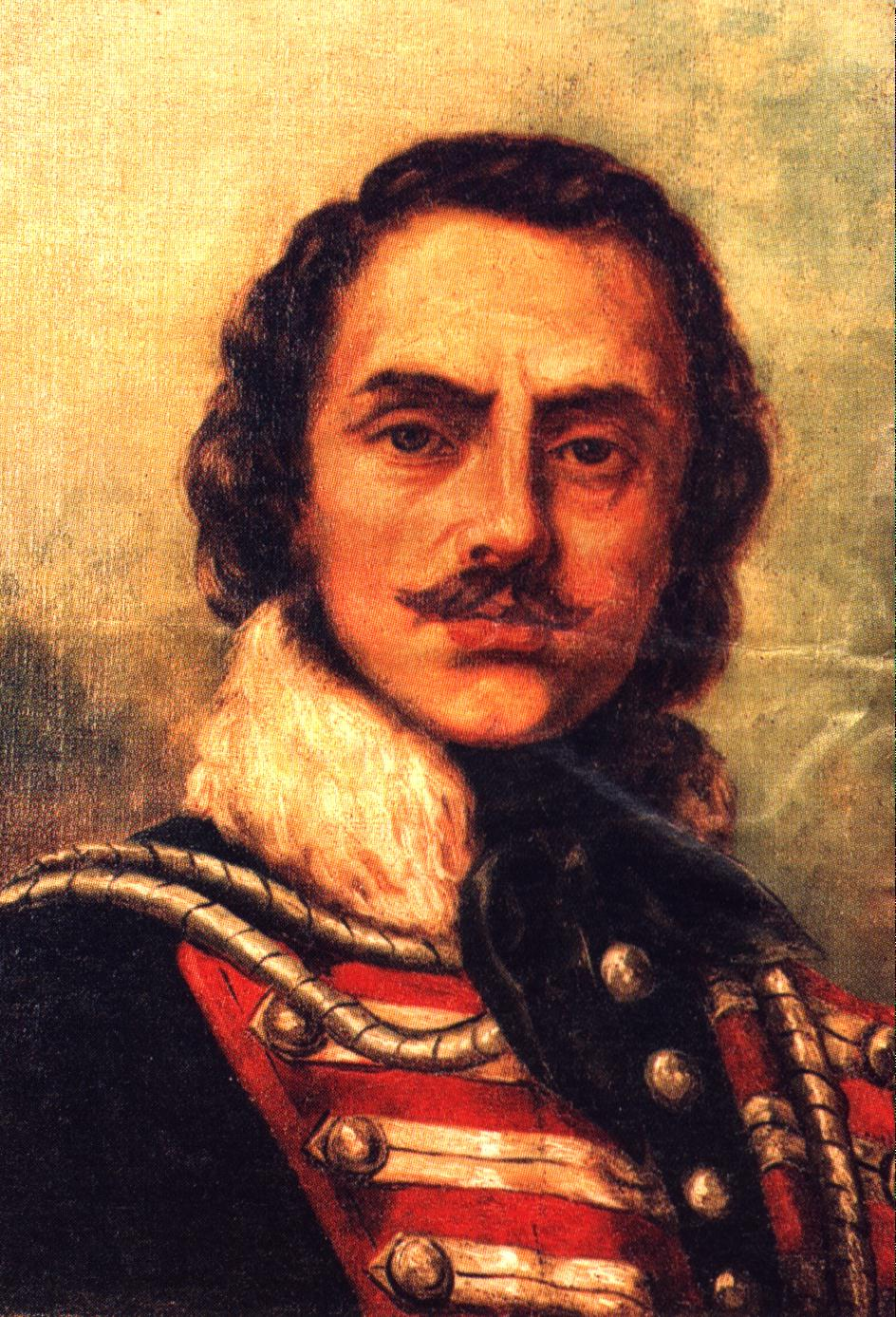
- Observed by: United States
- Type: National Holiday
- Date: October 11
- Next time: October 11, 2027
- Frequency: annual
- Related to: Casimir Pulaski Day

General Pulaski Memorial Day is a United States public holiday in honor of General Kazimierz Pułaski (spelled Casimir Pulaski in English), a Polish hero of the American Revolution. This holiday is held every year on October 11 by Presidential Proclamation, to commemorate his death from wounds suffered at the siege of Savannah on October 9, 1779, and to honor the heritage of Polish Americans. The observance was established in 1929 when Congress passed a resolution (Public Resolution 16 of 1929) designating October 11 as General Pulaski Memorial Day. Every President has issued a proclamation for the observance annually since (except in 1930).

This is a separate holiday from the regional holiday in the Chicago area titled Casimir Pulaski Day that commemorates Pulaski's birth on March 4, 1746.

== Regional celebrations ==
New York City and Philadelphia have annual Pulaski Day Parades and Grand Rapids, Michigan holds Pulaski Days at this time. Some areas with large Polish-American populations instead celebrate Casimir Pulaski Day on the first Monday of every March, marking Pulaski's March 4, 1746 birth. Wisconsin, Illinois, Kentucky and Indiana have state recognition of this holiday, which is particularly popular in Chicago and Milwaukee.

General Pulaski's Day is a holiday recognized by the Commonwealth of Kentucky, United States, "in commemoration of the death of revolutionary General Casimir Pulaski". General Pulaski's Day is observed on October 11 of every year in Kentucky. General Pulaski's Day was created by a statute enacted by the Kentucky General Assembly sometime prior to 1942.

== History of the battle and Pulaski's role ==
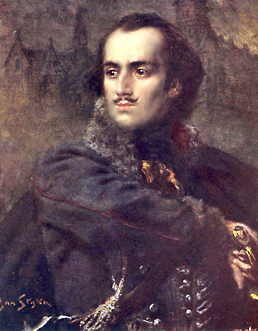
Kazimierz Pulaski, by Jan Styka

The siege of Savannah was an encounter of the American Revolutionary War in 1779. The year before, the city of Savannah, Georgia had been captured by a British expeditionary corps under Lieutenant-Colonel Archibald Campbell. The siege itself consisted of a joint Franco-American attempt to retake Savannah from September 16, 1779, to October 18, 1779. On October 9, 1779, a major assault against the British siege works failed. During the attack, General Kazimierz Pułaski, leading the cavalry, was mortally wounded. With the failure of the joint American-French attack, the siege failed, and the British remained in control of Georgia until July 1782, close to the end of the war.

The battle is much remembered in Haitian history; the Fontages Legion, consisting of over 500 gens de couleur—free men of color from Saint-Domingue—fought on the French side. Henri Christophe, who later became king of independent Haiti, is thought to have been among these troops.

In 2005 archaeologists with the Coastal Heritage Society and the LAMAR Institute discovered portions of the British fortifications at Spring Hill. The brunt of the combined French and American attack on October 9, 1779, was focused at that point. The find represents the first tangible remains of the battlefield. In 2008 the CHS/LAMAR Institute archaeology team discovered another segment of the British fortifications in Madison Square.

== Observances ==
President George W. Bush issued a presidential proclamation on October 10, 2002, observing the day. President Barack Obama issued the observance on October 8, 2010. On October 10, 2017, President Donald Trump proclaimed the day.
