= Casimir Pulaski Day =

Holiday celebrated in Illinois, United States

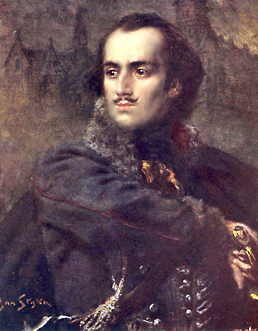
- Observed by: Illinois, USA
- Type: Illinois holiday
- Date: First Monday in March
- 2025 date: March 3
- 2026 date: March 2
- 2027 date: March 1
- 2028 date: March 6
- Frequency: annual
- Related to: General Pulaski Memorial Day

Casimir Pulaski Day (Polish: Dzień Kazimierza Pułaskiego) is a local holiday officially observed in Illinois, on the first Monday of March in memory of Casimir Pulaski (March 6, 1745 – October 11, 1779), an American Revolutionary War cavalry officer born in Poland as Kazimierz Pułaski. He is praised for his contributions to the U.S. military in the American Revolution and known as "the father of the American cavalry".

== Description ==
Casimir Pulaski Day is celebrated mainly in areas that have large Polish populations, such as Chicago and Bloomington. The focus of official commemorations of Casimir Pulaski Day in Chicago is at the Polish Museum of America where various city and state officials congregate to pay tribute to Chicago's Polish Community.

The city of Chicago celebrated its first official Pulaski Day in 1986. On February 26, 1986, Mayor Harold Washington introduced a resolution to designate the first Monday in March General Casimir Pulaski Day, and the City Council approved. The Chicago Public Library closes in observance of Pulaski Day but Chicago Public Schools remain open. Pulaski Day stopped being a holiday for Chicago Public Schools in 2012 as a way to increase the number of days in the school year, although some Illinois schools still observe the holiday depending on snow days.

This is a separate holiday from the federal observance, General Pulaski Memorial Day, which commemorates Pulaski's death from wounds suffered at the Siege of Savannah October 11, 1779.

Illinois enacted a law on September 13, 1977, to celebrate the birthday of Casimir Pulaski and held the first official Pulaski Day celebrations in 1978. The bill was introduced by State Senator Norbert A. Kosinski, a Democrat from Chicago, and signed by Thomas Hynes, President of the Senate, on June 26, 1977. Cook County government offices, the Chicago Public Library, and many statewide public and private schools are closed on this holiday; however, Chicago Public Schools no longer continue the tradition.

Wisconsin public schools also observe Casimir Pulaski Day, although they do not close for it. Banks in Illinois may close for the holiday.

Section 118.02 of the Wisconsin Statutes provides that, "...when school is held or, if the day falls on a Saturday or Sunday, on a school day immediately preceding or following the respective day, the day shall be appropriately observed...." The use of "shall" denotes this as a mandatory requirement. Each public school in Wisconsin must observe Casimir Pulaski Day on March 4. How the day is observed — "appropriately" — allows for some discretion among the schools.

Buffalo, New York also acknowledges a "Pulaski Day," which is held in the middle of July, and is celebrated with an annual parade.

On November 6, 2009, President Barack Obama signed a joint resolution of the U.S. Senate and House of Representatives making Pulaski an honorary American citizen, 230 years after his death. He is one of eight people to be granted honorary United States citizenship.

Grand Rapids, Michigan hosts a "Pulaski Days" celebration annually on the first full weekend of October in recognition of General Pulaski and the Polish culture in general.

== See also ==
- Von Steuben Day
- Public holidays in Illinois
