= Norbert A. Kosinski =

American politician

Norbert A. Kosinski (August 21, 1918 – March 10, 1978) was an American politician.

== Biography ==
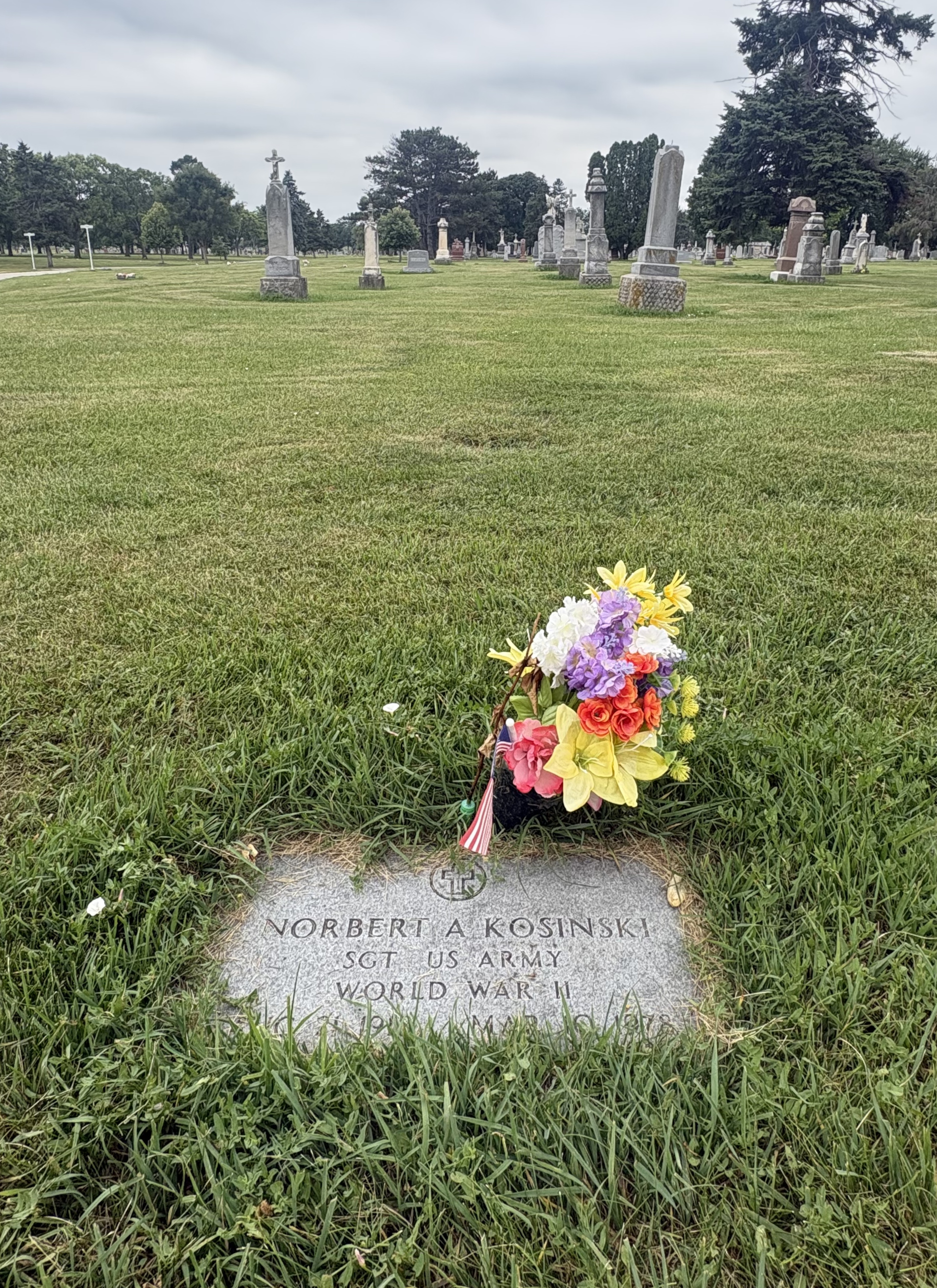
Kosinski 's grave at St. Adalbert Cemetery

Kosinski was born in Chicago, Illinois. He went to elementary and high schools in Chicago and business school in Poland. Kosinski served in the United States Army during World War II and was commissioned a sergeant. Kosinski served in the Illinois Senate from 1971 to his death in 1978. He was a Democrat. Kosinski died from a heart attack while at a fund-raising campaign rally in Chicago. Kosinski won the nomination in the Illinois Democratic primary election on March 21, 1978, after his death.

He was buried at St. Adalbert Cemetery in Niles, Illinois.
