= Little Egg Harbor Township, New Jersey =

Township in Ocean County, New Jersey, US

- Township
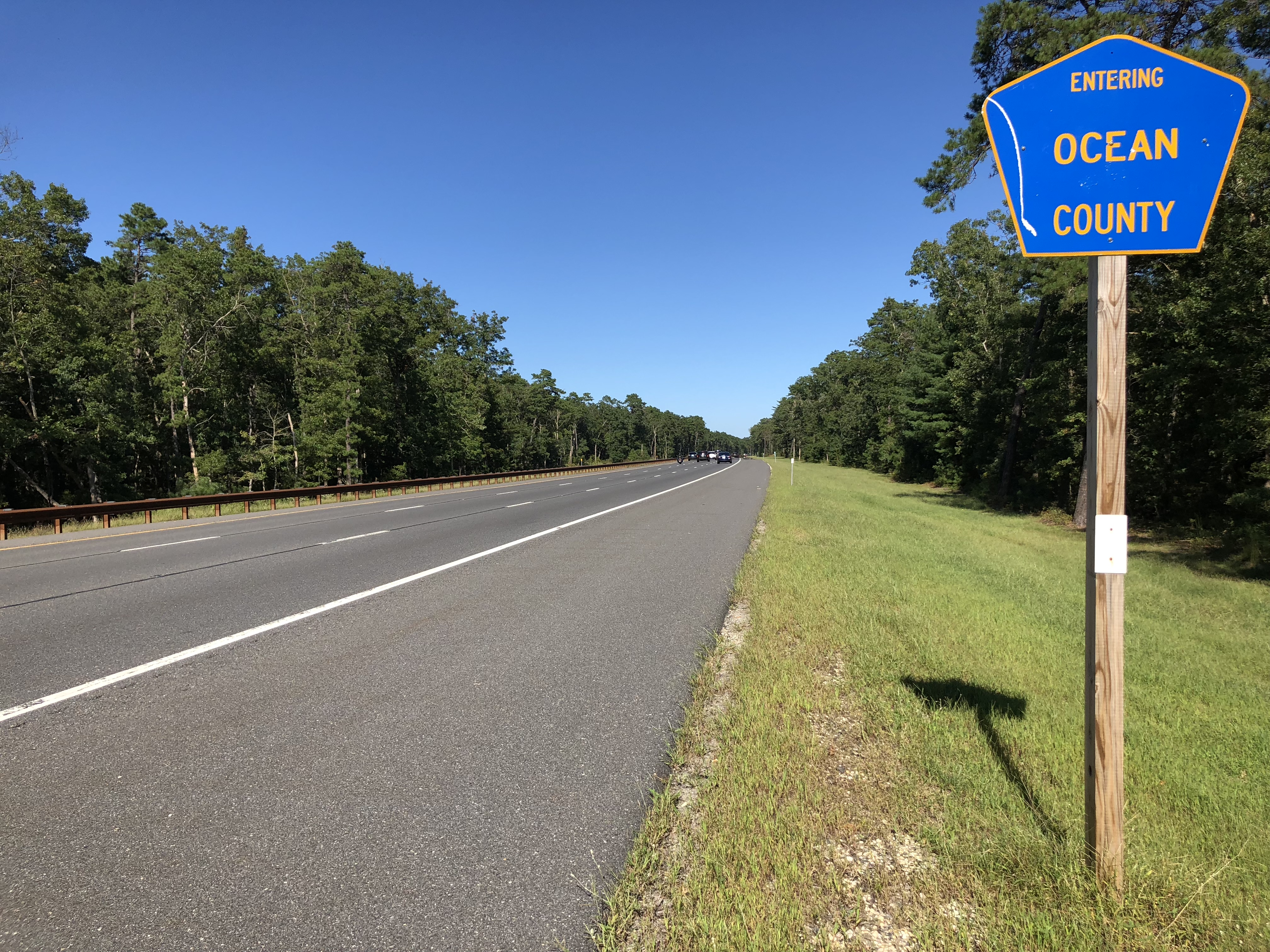
- Entering Ocean County at Little Egg Harbor Township while traveling northbound on the Garden State Parkway

- Seal

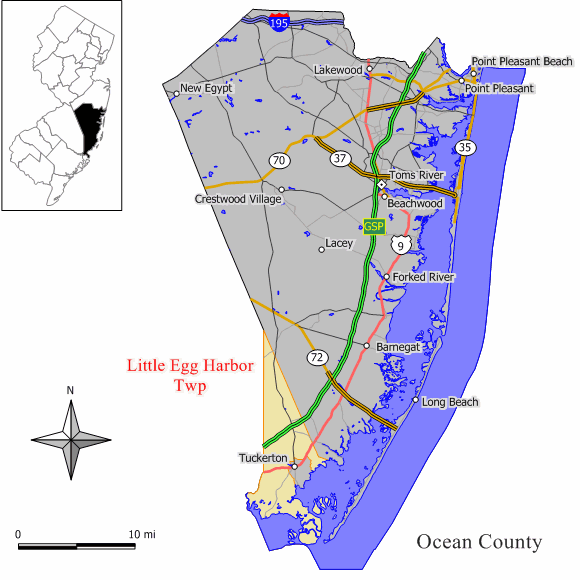
- Location of Little Egg Harbor Township in Ocean County highlighted in yellow (right). Inset map: Location of Ocean County in New Jersey highlighted in black (left).

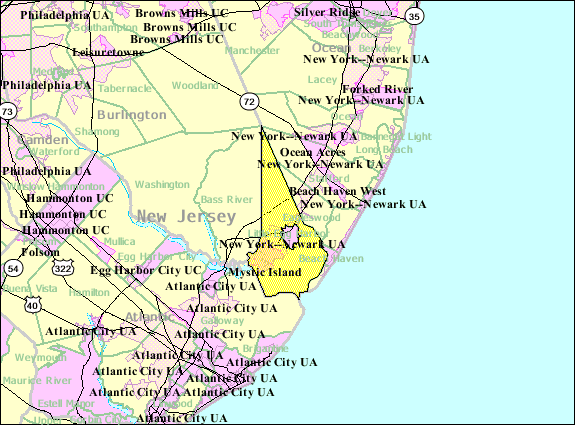
- Census Bureau map of Little Egg Harbor Township, New Jersey

- Location in Ocean County Location in New Jersey Location in the United States
- Coordinates: 39.6330°N 74.33103°W
- Country: United States
- State: New Jersey
- County: Ocean
- European discovery: 1614
- Founded: February 13, 1740
- Incorporated: February 21, 1798

Government
  - Type: Township
  - Body: Township Committee
  - Mayor: Blaise Scibetta (R, term ends December 31, 2024)
  - Administrator: Rodney R. Haines
  - Municipal clerk: Kelly Lettera

Area
  - Total: 72.97 sq mi (188.99 km^{2})
  - Land: 47.35 sq mi (122.63 km^{2})
  - Water: 25.62 sq mi (66.36 km^{2}) 35.11%
  - Rank: 13th of 565 in state 4th of 33 in county
- Elevation: 0 ft (0 m)

Population (2020)
  - Total: 20,784
  - Estimate (2023): 21,483
  - Rank: 132nd of 565 in state 10th of 33 in county
  - Density: 439/sq mi (169/km^{2})
  - Rank: 450th of 565 in state 29th of 33 in county
- Time zone: UTC−05:00 (Eastern (EST))
  - Summer (DST): UTC−04:00 (Eastern (EDT))
- ZIP Code: 08087
- Area code: 609
- FIPS code: 3402940560
- GNIS feature ID: 0882067
- Website: www.leht.com

Little Egg Harbor Township is a township situated on the Jersey Shore, within Ocean County, in the U.S. state of New Jersey. The township is the southernmost municipality in both Ocean County and the New York metropolitan area. As of the 2020 United States census, the township's population was 20,784, its highest decennial count ever and an increase of 719 (+3.6%) from the 2010 census count of 20,065, which in turn reflected an increase of 4,120 (+25.8%) from the 15,945 counted in the 2000 census.

== History ==
=== Founding ===
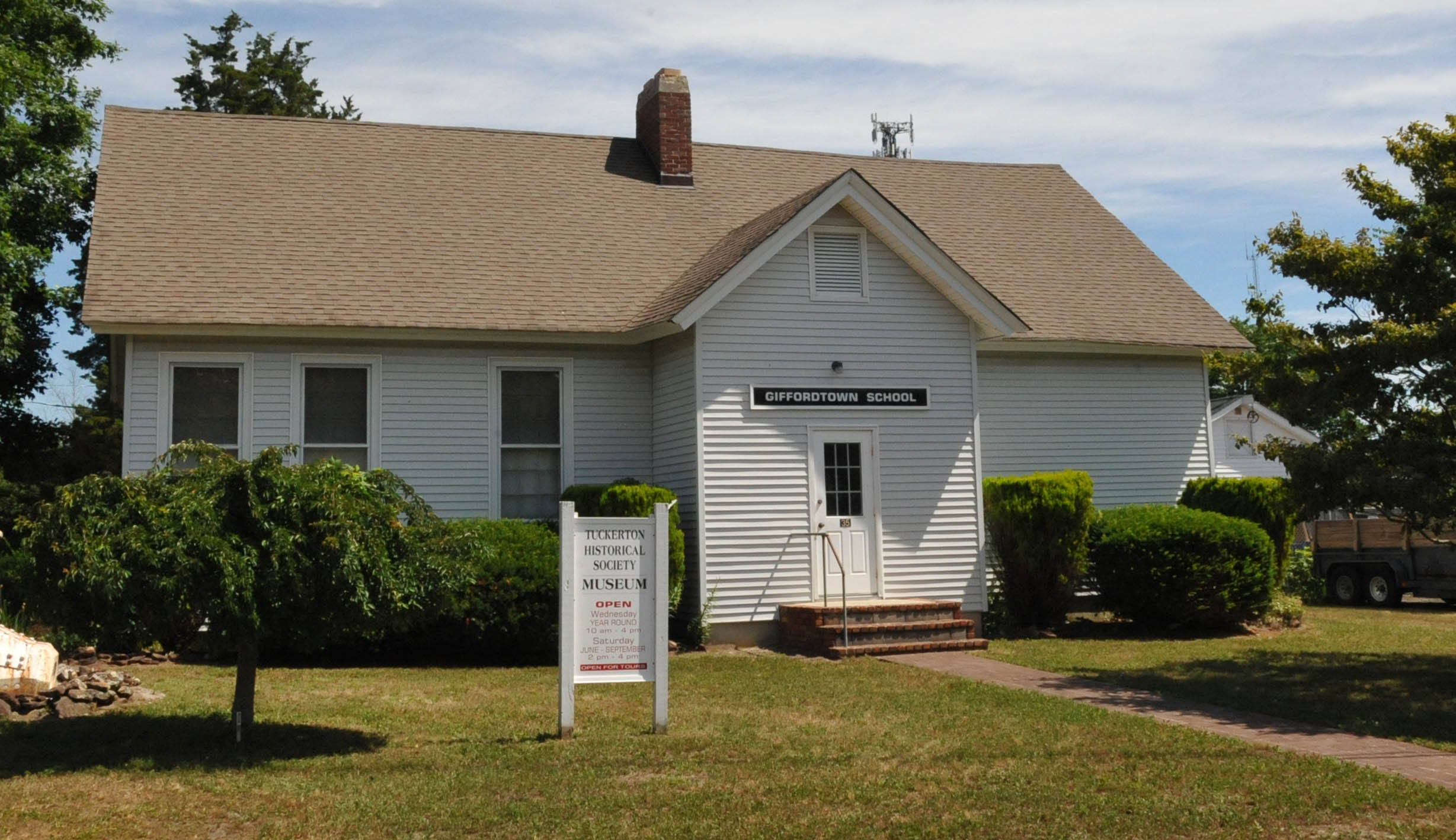
The Giffordtown Schoolhouse, which operated until 1951, now part of the Tuckerton Historical Society

Originally part of Burlington County, Little Egg Harbor took its name from the portion of a bay called Egg Harbor (known today as Little Egg Harbor) by the Dutch sailors because of the eggs found in nearby gull nests. The first known account of the town was made by Captain Cornelius Jacobsen May in 1614.

The first European to settle the township was Hendrick Jacobs Falkenberg, who likely arrived by 1693 when he does not appear on a census of the Swedes along the Delaware River, where he had lived for nearly three decades. Though he was from Holstein (now in Germany), his first wife was a Finn and part of the Swedish community. Falkenberg settled on an 800-acre (320 ha) tract of land that he had acquired from the Lenni Lenape Native Americans in 1674, and a 1697 deed re-confirmed this earlier purchase. This tract included the two islands of Monhunk and Minnicunk later known as Osborn Island and Wills Island. Falkenberg was a linguist, fluent in the Lenape language, and was considered southern New Jersey's foremost language interpreter involving land transactions between the Indians and the European settlers, particularly the English Quakers.

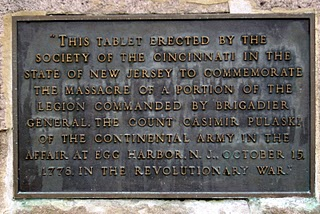
Plaque commemorating the affair at Little Egg Harbor

The affair at Little Egg Harbor took place in Little Egg Harbor on October 1778 during the American Revolutionary War. British forces under Major Patrick Ferguson were attacking American ships in the Mullica River. Casimir Pulaski and his newly raised troops were ordered to oppose his actions. Pulaski's Legion, along with three companies of light infantry, three troops of light horse, and one artillery detachment, came too late to be of great use against Ferguson's operations. But their arrival did stop Ferguson from raiding the iron works at Batsto, and stemmed their attacks on privateers at The Forks of the Mullica River.

They then set up camp on a farm. An American deserter, Lieutenant Gustav Juliet, found Ferguson and told him of Pulaski's encampment; he mentioned that morale there was fairly low, and security almost nonexistent, so that a surprise attack would be devastating. Ferguson promptly loaded 250 of his best men onto boats and rowed them, in the dark, some 10 miles (16 km) to Osborne Island. He then marched them a further 2 miles (3.2 km) to the site of the infantry outpost, which comprised 50 men a short distance from the main encampment. At first light, Ferguson ordered the attack; 45 American soldiers were killed and the remanining five taken prisoner. Pulaski eventually led his mounted troops up, causing Ferguson to retreat to his boats minus a few men that had fallen into American hands. A memorial on Radio Road commemorates the attack.

Little Egg Harbor Township was formed on February 13, 1740, as Egg Harbour Township from portions of Northampton Township (now Mount Holly), while the area was still part of Burlington County. It was incorporated as one of New Jersey's 104 in the Township Act of 1798 by an act of the New Jersey Legislature on February 21, 1798. While in Burlington County, portions of the township were taken to form Washington Township (November 19, 1802) and Bass River Township (March 30, 1864). Little Egg Harbor Township became part of Ocean County on March 30, 1891, after which further portions of the township were ceded to create Long Beach Township (March 23, 1899) and Tuckerton (February 18, 1901).

=== Tuckerton Wireless Tower ===
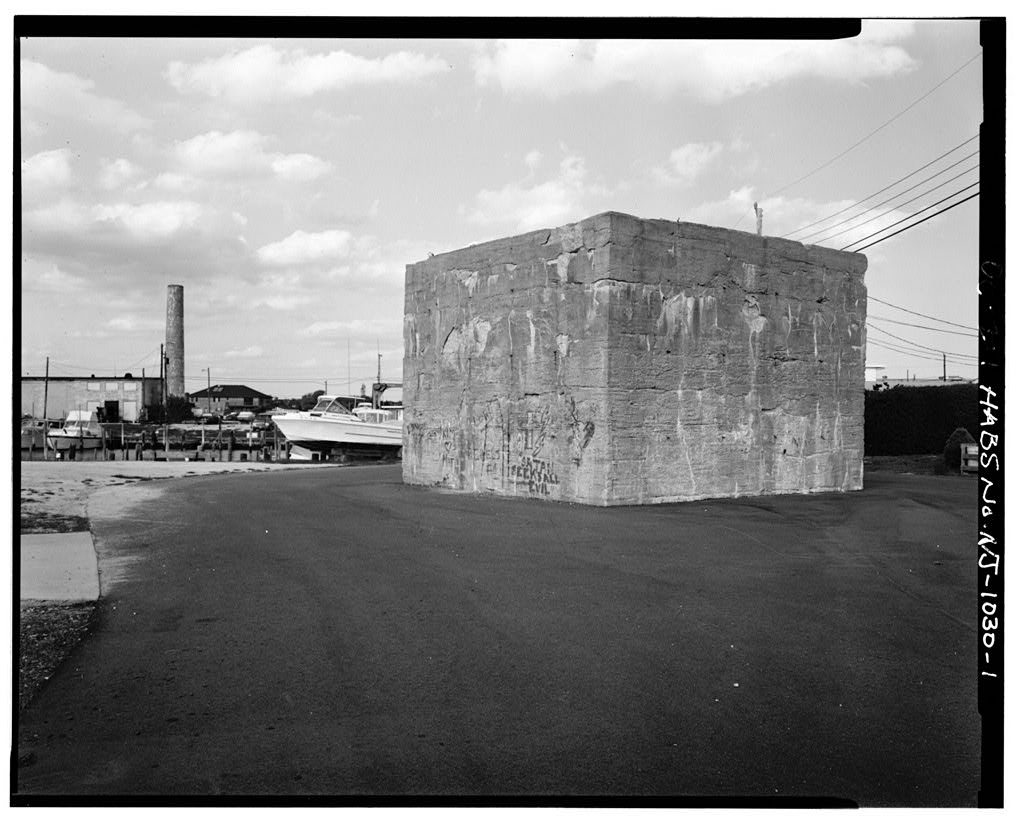
A concrete footing for the former Tuckerton Wireless Tower, located in the center of South Ensign Drive

The Tuckerton Wireless Tower (39.5585°N 74.3706°W), at 825 feet (251 m) in height, was built in 1912 by the German "Hochfrequenzmaschinen Aktiengesellschaft Für Drahtlose Telegraphie" company (The High Frequency Machine Corporation for Wireless Telegraphy, often referred to as HOMAG) when the present-day Mystic Island was called Hickory Island. The tower was used to communicate with an identical radio telegraph station in Eilvese, Germany starting on Jun 19, 1914, less than two weeks before the assassination of Archduke Franz Ferdinand. The station continued to communicate with Eilvese until America entered World War I on April 6, 1917. It is rumored that it was used to send the message to order the attack by a German U-boat on the RMS Lusitania. After President Wilson's Declaration of Neutrality, the President's Executive Order 2042 required the US Navy to take over the station on September 9, 1914, to assure the neutrality of messages sent to and from the station. However, the station continued to be operated by German nationals employed by HOMAG and continued to communicate only with the Eilvese radio station.

When America entered the war, all U.S. radio stations were seized and shut down by Executive Order 2605A on April 30, 1917. The remaining German personnel at Tuckerton immediately became war prisoners and were replaced by U.S. Navy personnel. The Navy used the Tuckerton Radio Station for transatlantic communications while the naval radio stations in New Brunswick, New Jersey and Sayville, New York were undergoing major transmitter and antenna upgrades. Tuckerton was used for fleet broadcasts after installations of 200 kilowatt transmitters at New Brunswick and Sayville were completed in June 1918.

After the war, the Tuckerton Wireless Station was included in German war reparations paid to America. Shortly afterwards, it was sold to RCA which operated it until 1948 as a backup to their famous Radio Central facility in Rocky Point, New York. In 1921, RCA installed two massive Alexanderson alternators, which were removed in 1948. For transatlantic communications, the radio station operated under the call signs WCI and WGG. For coastal communications, after World War I, the station operated under the callsign WSC. The 820-foot (250 m) steel tower, anchored by three large concrete blocks, was taken down on December 27, 1955. The three huge anchor blocks still exist today, in a backyard on North Ensign Drive and in the middle of South Ensign Drive and Staysail Drive. Many smaller anchor blocks providing foundations for smaller towers that supported the umbrella antenna are still visible in the lagoons. Remains of the large tower can be seen in scraps at the Giffordtown Museum.

=== Later history ===
While the township was formed in the 1700s, Little Egg Harbor remained predominantly rural and undeveloped well into the late 20th century. It wasn't until the late 1950s until any major development was started. During this time, the construction of manufactured waterfront bungalows on lagoons were built and marketed as vacation properties, most notably Mystic Islands, Holly Lake Harbor, as well as Atlantis; the latter of which a "research home" was constructed to test hundreds of components and finishing materials for possible inclusion in model homes. Most of the population were seasonal residents from either New York, Philadelphia, or other parts of New Jersey. Several developments were constructed in the decades following around the Mystic Islands area, mostly consisting of townhomes, duplex, and small single-family homes meant to act as either vacation homes or year-round residence.

In 1979, Pinelands Regional High School opened in the growing township, serving students from Little Egg Harbor, Tuckerton, Bass River, and Eagleswood; those students formerly went to Southern Regional High School in Manahawkin.

By the 2000s, the township was one of the fastest-growing in Ocean County, next to Barnegat. The formerly sleepy township saw the development of several new housing developments, shopping centers, and offices. While 75% of the growth came from new retirement communities, the former resort town dubbed "Little Treasure on the Bay" saw an influx of year-round residents and families, becoming more of a suburb.

On November 3, 2004, a fighter jet on a training mission from the 113th Wing of the District of Columbia Air National Guard, based at Andrews Air Force Base in Maryland, shot seven bullets into the roof of the Little Egg Harbor Intermediate School, and many others into the parking lot. Only a few custodians were in the school, and nobody was injured. The plane had been on a training mission at the Warren Grove Gunnery Range, a 2,400-acre (10 km^{2}) area about 3.5 miles (5.6 km) from the school. The school was repaired during the New Jersey Teachers' Convention, using $519,000 paid by the Air Force to the school district.

On the morning of August 28, 2011, Tropical Storm Irene made its second U.S. landfall in Brigantine, though initial reports placed it at the Little Egg Inlet on the border with Galloway Township. At the time it was believed to be the first hurricane to make landfall in New Jersey since 1903, but later analysis by the National Hurricane Center determined that the storm had weakened to tropical storm status by the time it made its second landfall. On October 29, 2012, Hurricane Sandy caused widespread damage and flooding to the township, damaging roughly 4,000 homes, especially in the Mystic Island section. On the one-year anniversary of the storm, New Jersey Governor Chris Christie visited the township's Community Center to celebrate both the reopening of the storm-damaged building as well as the recovery efforts from the storm.

== Geography ==
According to the United States Census Bureau, the township had a total area of 72.97 square miles (188.99 km^{2}), including 47.35 square miles (122.63 km^{2}) of land and 25.62 square miles (66.36 km^{2}) of water (35.11%).

Mystic Island (2020 Census population of 8,301) is an unincorporated community and census-designated place (CDP) located in the southern part of the township.

Other unincorporated communities, localities and place names located partially or completely within the township include Atlantis, Edge Cove, Giffordtown, Jessies Point, Nugentown, Parkertown, Storm Island, Tucker Beach and West Tuckerton.

The township borders the Ocean County municipalities of Barnegat Township, Beach Haven, Eagleswood Township, Long Beach Township and Stafford Township; Galloway Township in Atlantic County; and both Bass River Township and Woodland Township in Burlington County. Little Egg Harbor completely surrounds the independent municipality of Tuckerton, which became independent when it was incorporated in 1901. Little Egg Harbor and Tuckerton share the same ZIP code.

== Demographics ==
Historical population
Census	Pop.	Note	%±
1800	1,160		—
1810	913		−21.3%
1820	1,102		20.7%
1830	1,491		35.3%
1840	1,875		25.8%
1850	2,020		7.7%
1860	2,375		17.6%
1870	1,779		−25.1%
1880	1,881		5.7%
1890	1,771		−5.8%
1900	1,856	*	4.8%
1910	388	*	−79.1%
1920	410		5.7%
1930	547		33.4%
1940	577		5.5%
1950	644		11.6%
1960	847		31.5%
1970	2,972		250.9%
1980	8,483		185.4%
1990	13,333		57.2%
2000	15,945		19.6%
2010	20,065		25.8%
2020	20,784		3.6%
2023 (est.)	21,483		3.4%
Population sources: 1800–1890 1850–2000; 1800–1920 1850–1870; 1850 1870 1880–1890; 1890–1910 1910–1930; 1940–2000 2000; 2010 2020 * = Lost territory in previous decade.

=== 2010 census ===
The 2010 United States census counted 20,065 people, 8,060 households, and 5,674 families in the township. The population density was 423.6 inhabitants per square mile (163.6/km^{2}). There were 10,324 housing units at an average density of 218.0 per square mile (84.2/km^{2}). The racial makeup was 94.19% (18,899) White, 1.35% (271) Black or African American, 0.16% (33) Native American, 1.24% (249) Asian, 0.01% (2) Pacific Islander, 1.51% (303) from other races, and 1.54% (308) from two or more races. Hispanic or Latino of any race were 5.22% (1,047) of the population.

Of the 8,060 households, 25.5% had children under the age of 18; 55.5% were married couples living together; 10.6% had a female householder with no husband present and 29.6% were non-families. Of all households, 24.2% were made up of individuals and 11.8% had someone living alone who was 65 years of age or older. The average household size was 2.46 and the average family size was 2.90.

20.4% of the population were under the age of 18, 6.7% from 18 to 24, 22.3% from 25 to 44, 29.0% from 45 to 64, and 21.6% who were 65 years of age or older. The median age was 45.4 years. For every 100 females, the population had 92.3 males. For every 100 females ages 18 and older there were 89.8 males.

The Census Bureau's 2006–2010 American Community Survey showed that (in 2010 inflation-adjusted dollars) median household income was $59,365 (with a margin of error of +/− $3,765) and the median family income was $66,345 (+/− $4,466). Males had a median income of $56,279 (+/− $3,204) versus $42,683 (+/− $3,850) for females. The per capita income for the borough was $28,566 (+/− $1,778). About 6.5% of families and 8.9% of the population were below the poverty line, including 14.9% of those under age 18 and 4.7% of those age 65 or over.

=== 2000 census ===
As of the 2000 United States census there were 15,945 people, 6,179 households, and 4,442 families residing in the township. The population density was 324.7 inhabitants per square mile (125.4/km^{2}). There were 7,931 housing units at an average density of 161.5 per square mile (62.4/km^{2}). The racial makeup of the township was 96.22% White, 0.79% African American, 0.26% Native American, 0.60% Asian, 0.01% Pacific Islander, 0.98% from other races, and 1.15% from two or more races. Hispanic or Latino of any race were 3.26% of the population.

There were 6,179 households, out of which 30.3% had children under the age of 18 living with them, 56.8% were married couples living together, 10.4% had a female householder with no husband present, and 28.1% were non-families. 22.5% of all households were made up of individuals, and 10.7% had someone living alone who was 65 years of age or older. The average household size was 2.55 and the average family size was 2.98.

In the township the population was spread out, with 24.2% under the age of 18, 6.7% from 18 to 24, 27.5% from 25 to 44, 23.9% from 45 to 64, and 17.7% who were 65 years of age or older. The median age was 40 years. For every 100 females, there were 92.3 males. For every 100 females age 18 and over, there were 89.8 males.

The median income for a household in the township was $45,628, and the median income for a family was $51,580. Males had a median income of $39,668 versus $29,576 for females. The per capita income for the township was $20,619. About 4.1% of families and 6.5% of the population were below the poverty line, including 9.4% of those under age 18 and 3.4% of those age 65 or over.

== Government ==
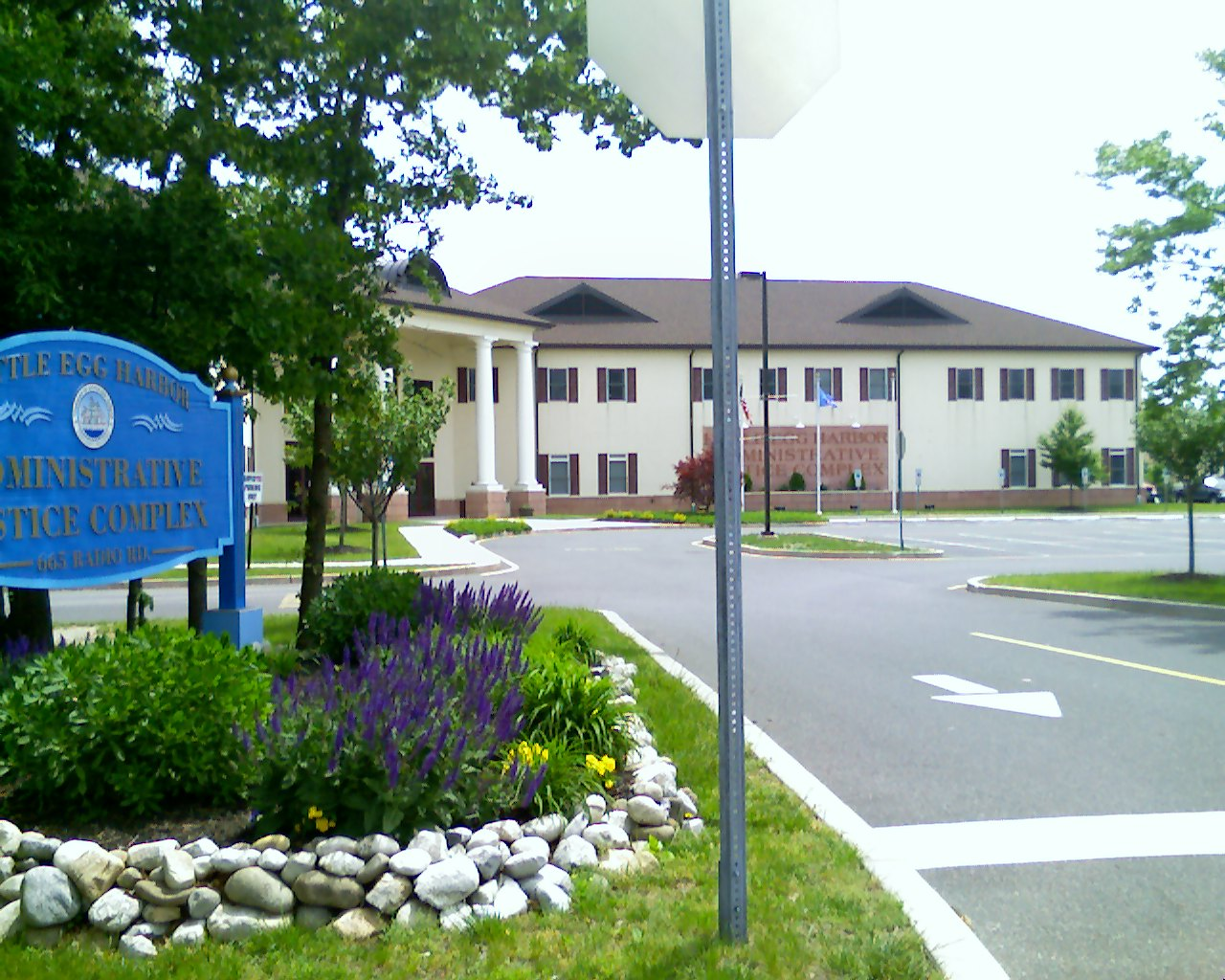
The Little Egg Harbor Administrative Justice Complex opened in 2004

=== Local government ===
Little Egg Harbor Township operates under the Township form of New Jersey municipal government, one of 141 municipalities (of the 564) statewide that use this form, the second-most commonly used form of government in the state. The Township Committee is comprised of five members, who are elected directly by the voters at-large in partisan elections to serve three-year terms of office on a staggered basis, with either one or two seats coming up for election each year as part of the November general election in a three-year cycle. Annually, the Township Committee selects one of its members to serve as Mayor, and another as Deputy Mayor, each serving one-year terms.

As of 2024, the members of the Township Committee are Mayor Blaise Scibetta (R, term on committee and as mayor ends December 31, 2024), Deputy Mayor Dan Maxwell (R, term on committee and as deputy mayor ends 2024), Ray Gormley (R, 2026), John Kehm Jr. (R, 2026) and Kenneth W. Laney Jr. (R, 2025).

In January 2022, the Township Committee appointed Kenneth Laney Jr. to fill the seat expiring in December 2022 that had been held by Barbara Jo Crea until she stepped down from office to take a seat on the Ocean County Board of County Commissioners.

==== Emergency services ====
Little Egg Harbor Township is served by Great Bay Regional Volunteer EMS, which also provides primary 911 emergency medical services for the residents of Bass River Township and Eagleswood Township.

=== Federal, state and county representation ===
Little Egg Harbor Township is located in the 2nd Congressional District and is part of New Jersey's 9th state legislative district.

For the 119th United States Congress, New Jersey's 2nd congressional district is represented by Jeff Van Drew (R, Dennis Township). New Jersey is represented in the United States Senate by Democrats Cory Booker (Newark, term ends 2027) and Andy Kim (Moorestown, term ends 2031).

For the 2026–2027 session, the 9th legislative district of the New Jersey Legislature is represented in the State Senate by Carmen Amato (R, Berkeley Township) and in the General Assembly by Greg Myhre (R, Stafford Township) and Brian E. Rumpf (R, Little Egg Harbor Township).

Ocean County is governed by a Board of County Commissioners composed of five members who are elected on an at-large basis in partisan elections and serving staggered three-year terms of office, with either one or two seats coming up for election each year as part of the November general election. At an annual reorganization held in the beginning of January, the board chooses a director and a deputy director from among its members. As of 2025, Ocean County's Commissioners (with party affiliation, term-end year and residence) are:

John P. Kelly (R, 2025, Eagleswood Township), Virginia E. Haines (R, 2025, Toms River), Robert Arace (R, Manchester Township, 2027) Jennifer Bacchione (R, Berkeley Township, 2027) and Frank Sadeghi (R, 2026, Toms River).

Constitutional officers elected on a countywide basis are: Clerk Scott M. Colabella (R, 2025, Barnegat Light), Sheriff Michael G. Mastronardy (R, 2025; Toms River) and Surrogate Jeffrey Moran (R, 2028, Beachwood).

=== Politics ===
As of March 2011, there were a total of 13,562 registered voters in Little Egg Harbor Township, of which 2,641 (19.5%) were registered as Democrats, 3,963 (29.2%) were registered as Republicans and 6,951 (51.3%) were registered as Unaffiliated. There were 7 voters registered as Libertarians or Greens. Among the township's 2010 Census population, 67.6% (vs. 63.2% in Ocean County) were registered to vote, including 84.9% of those ages 18 and over (vs. 82.6% countywide).

Gubernatorial election results for Little Egg Harbor Township
Year	Republican		Democratic		Third party(ies)	
Year	No.	%	No.	%	No.	%
2025	6,299	63.77%	3,517	35.61%	61	0.62%
2021	5,594	69.43%	2,393	29.70%	70	0.87%
2017	3,663	61.64%	2,149	36.16%	131	2.20%
2013	4,603	74.55%	1,449	23.47%	122	1.98%
2009	4,198	63.81%	1,926	29.27%	455	6.92%
2005	3,119	54.99%	2,275	40.11%	278	4.90%

In the 2016 presidential election, Republican Donald Trump received 64.97% of the vote (6,700 cast), ahead of Democrat Hillary Clinton with 30.88% (3,184 votes), and other candidates with 4.15% (428 votes), among the 10,417 ballots cast by the township's 14,633 registered voters (105 ballots were spoiled), for a turnout of 71.1%. In the 2012 presidential election, Republican Mitt Romney received 57.0% of the vote (5,129 cast), ahead of Democrat Barack Obama with 42.0% (3,777 votes), and other candidates with 1.1% (97 votes), among the 9,060 ballots cast by the township's 14,200 registered voters (57 ballots were spoiled), for a turnout of 63.8%. In the 2008 presidential election, Republican John McCain received 56.5% of the vote (5,577 cast), ahead of Democrat Barack Obama with 41.6% (4,108 votes) and other candidates with 1.2% (117 votes), among the 9,879 ballots cast by the township's 14,042 registered voters, for a turnout of 70.4%. In the 2004 presidential election, Republican George W. Bush received 58.9% of the vote (5,046 ballots cast), outpolling Democrat John Kerry with 40.0% (3,430 votes) and other candidates with 0.6% (71 votes), among the 8,571 ballots cast by the township's 12,064 registered voters, for a turnout percentage of 71.0.

Presidential Elections Results
Year	Republican	Democratic	Third Parties
2024	65.3% 8,116	32.9% 4,095	1.8% 188
2020	62.4% 7,873	35.6% 4,492	2.0% 204
2016	65.0% 6,700	30.9% 3,184	4.2% 428
2012	57.0% 5,129	42.0% 3,777	1.1% 97
2008	56.5% 5,577	41.6% 4,108	1.2% 117
2004	58.9% 5,046	40.0% 3,430	0.6% 71

In the 2013 gubernatorial election, Republican Chris Christie received 74.6% of the vote (4,603 cast), ahead of Democrat Barbara Buono with 23.5% (1,449 votes), and other candidates with 2.0% (122 votes), among the 6,322 ballots cast by the township's 13,898 registered voters (148 ballots were spoiled), for a turnout of 45.5%. In the 2009 gubernatorial election, Republican Chris Christie received 63.0% of the vote (4,198 ballots cast), ahead of Democrat Jon Corzine with 28.9% (1,926 votes), Independent Chris Daggett with 5.5% (364 votes) and other candidates with 1.4% (91 votes), among the 6,666 ballots cast by the township's 13,690 registered voters, yielding a 48.7% turnout.

United States Senate election results for Little Egg Harbor Township1
Year	Republican		Democratic		Third party(ies)	
Year	No.	%	No.	%	No.	%
2024	7,478	63.42%	4,182	35.46%	132	1.12%
2018	5,439	65.34%	2,610	31.36%	275	3.30%
2012	4,829	56.64%	3,566	41.83%	131	1.54%
2006	3,192	56.96%	2,254	40.22%	158	2.82%

United States Senate election results for Little Egg Harbor Township2
Year	Republican		Democratic		Third party(ies)	
Year	No.	%	No.	%	No.	%
2020	7,742	62.98%	4,329	35.22%	222	1.81%
2014	3,208	62.55%	1,814	35.37%	107	2.09%
2013	2,225	63.86%	1,225	35.16%	34	0.98%
2008	5,161	56.37%	3,824	41.76%	171	1.87%

== Education ==
Students in public school for grades pre-kindergarten through sixth grade attend the schools of the Little Egg Harbor Township School District. The district also serves Bass River Township, a non-operating district whose students attend as part of a sending/receiving relationship that started in the 2020–21 school year. As of the 2024–25 school year, the district, comprised of three schools, had an enrollment of 1,680 students and 136.2 classroom teachers (on an FTE basis), for a student–teacher ratio of 12.3:1. Schools in the district (with 2024–25 enrollment data from the National Center for Education Statistics.) are Robert C. Wood Sr. Early Childhood Center with 318 students in pre-kindergarten, George J. Mitchell Elementary School with 582 students in kindergarten through third grade and Frog Pond Elementary School with 780 students in grades 4 to 6.

Public school students in seventh through twelfth grades attend the schools of the Pinelands Regional School District, which also serves students from Bass River Township, Eagleswood Township and Tuckerton Borough. Schools in the district (with 2024–25 enrollment data from the National Center for Education Statistics) are Pinelands Regional Junior High School with 500 students in grades 7–8 and Pinelands Regional High School with 1,063 students in grades 9–12. The high school district's board of education is comprised of nine members directly elected by the residents of the constituent municipalities to three-year terms on a staggered basis, with three seats up for election each year. Little Egg Harbor Township is allocated six of the nine seats.

St. Mary Academy near Manahawkin, a K–8 school of the Roman Catholic Diocese of Trenton, is managed by St. Mary Church of Barnegat. From 1997, until 2019 it operated as All Saints Regional Catholic School and was collectively managed by five churches, including St. Theresa Church in Little Egg Harbor Township. In 2019 St. Mary took entire control of the school, which remained on the same Manahawkin campus, and changed its name. The other churches no longer operate the school but still may send students there.

== Transportation ==
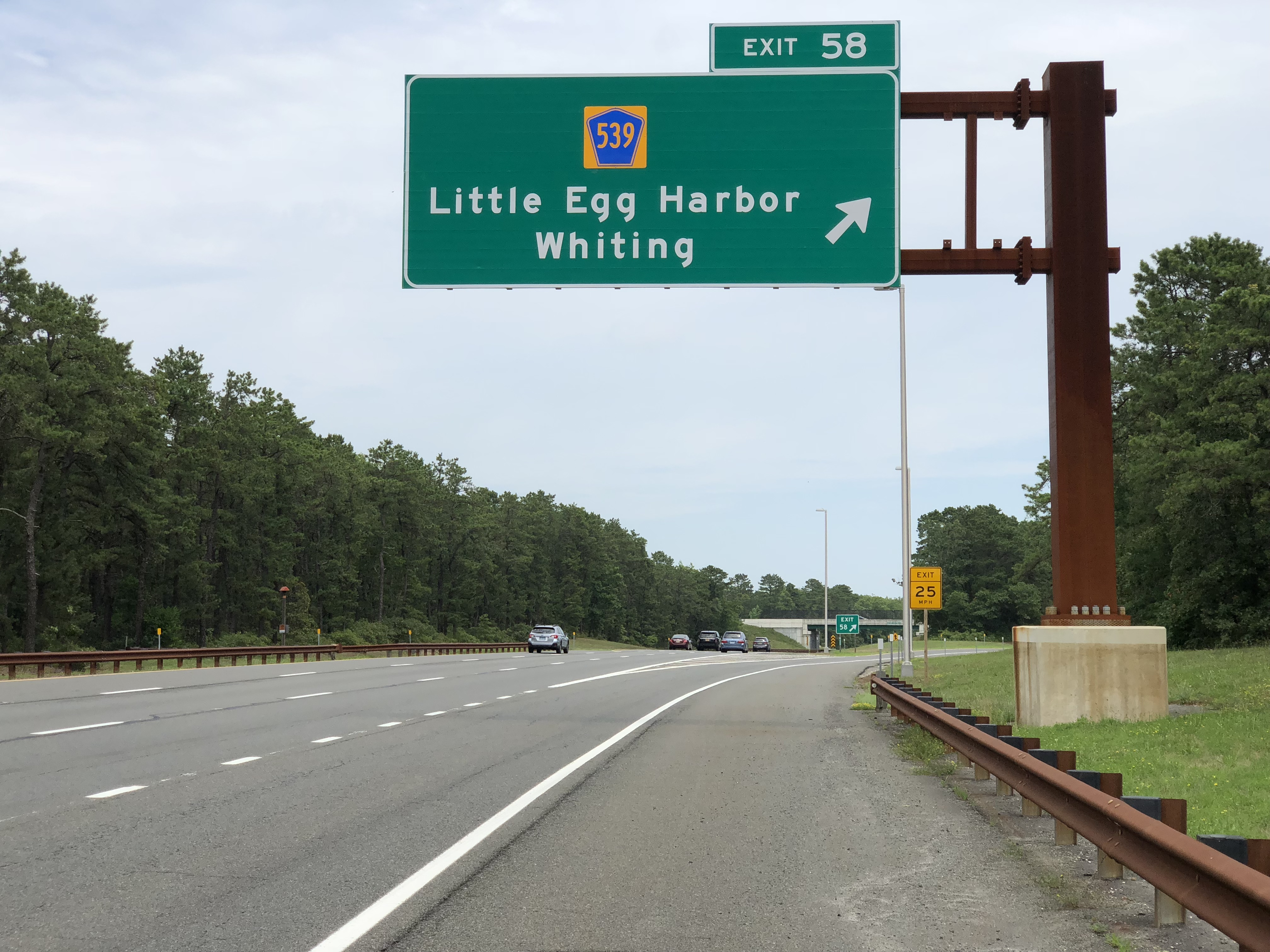
The northbound Garden State Parkway at the exit for Little Egg Harbor Township

=== Roads and highways ===
As of May 2010, the township had a total of 128.34 miles (206.54 km) of roadways, of which 86.31 miles (138.90 km) were maintained by the municipality, 34.55 miles (55.60 km) by Ocean County, 3.47 miles (5.58 km) by the New Jersey Department of Transportation and 4.01 miles (6.45 km) by the New Jersey Turnpike Authority.

The Garden State Parkway passes through the township, connecting Bass River Township in Burlington County in the south to Eagleswood Township in the north and includes interchange 58, which is signed for County Route 539 serving Tuckerton / Trenton. County Route 539 and Route 9 are major arteries in the township.

=== Public transportation ===
NJ Transit provides bus service between the township and Atlantic City on the 559 route.

Ocean Ride local service is provided on the OC6 Little Egg Harbor – Stafford Township route.

== Notable people ==
People who were born in, residents of, or otherwise closely associated with Little Egg Harbor Township include:

- Gaten Matarazzo (born 2002), star in the Netflix original series Stranger Things
- Lily McBeth (1934–2014), transgender substitute teacher at the town's local schools who made national news after she underwent a gender reassignment operation
- James Moody, (c. 1744–1809), loyalist soldier who fought for the British during the American Revolutionary War; after the war, Moody retired to Canada so as not to face punishment as a traitor
- Brian E. Rumpf (born 1964), member of the New Jersey General Assembly since 2003, who also served on the Little Egg Harbor Township Committee, serving as the township's mayor from 2000 to 2003

== See also ==
- Egg Harbor City, New Jersey
- Egg Harbor Township, New Jersey
