= Mystic Island, New Jersey =

Populated place in Ocean County, New Jersey, US

- Census-designated place
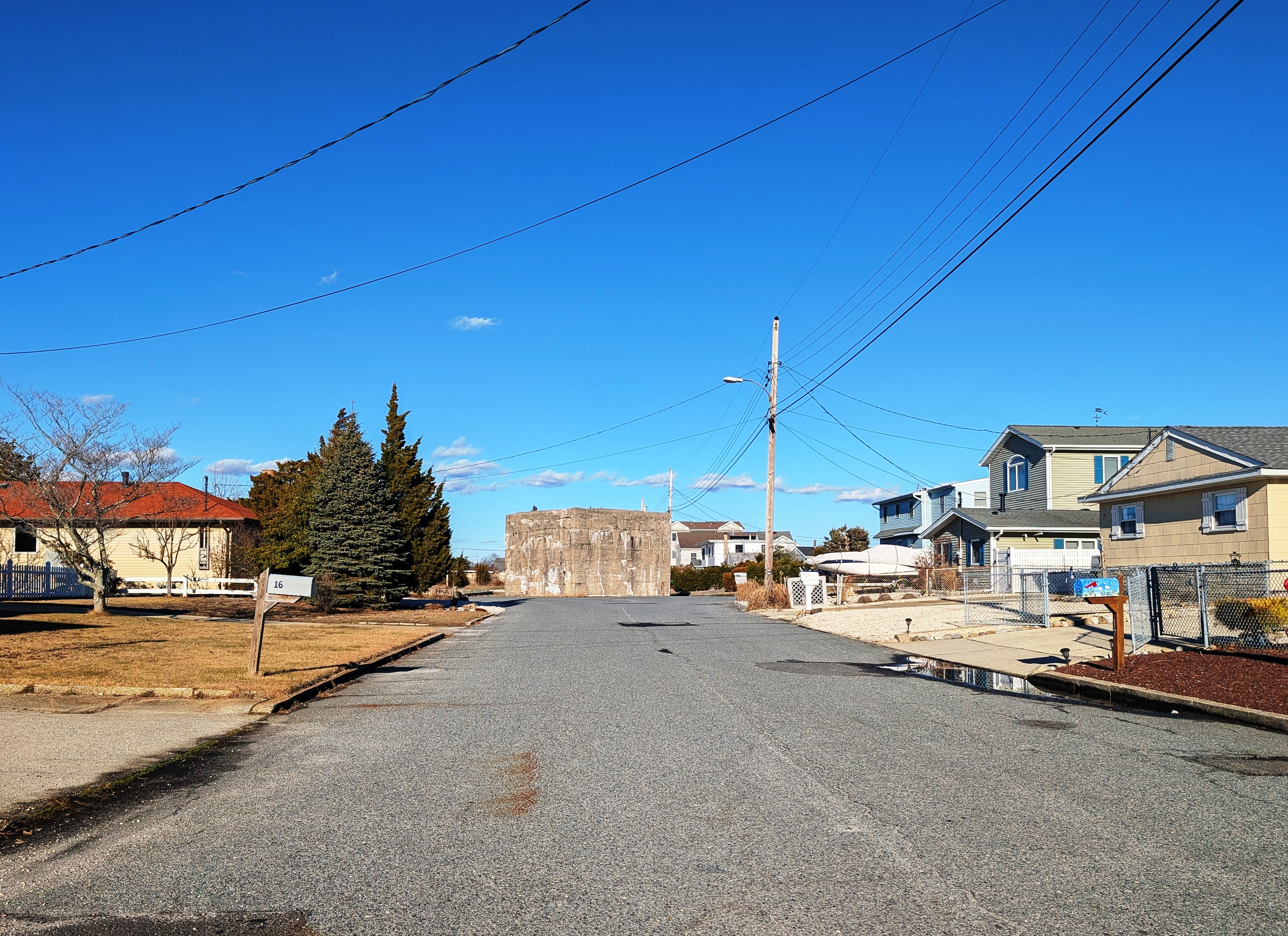
- Abandoned Tuckerton Wireless Tower anchor along Ensign Drive

- Location of Mystic Island in Ocean County highlighted in red (left). Inset map: Location of Ocean County in New Jersey highlighted in orange (right).

- Location in Ocean County Location in New Jersey Location in the United States
- Coordinates: 39.5677°N 74.3879°W
- Country: United States
- State: New Jersey
- County: Ocean
- Township: Little Egg Harbor

Area
  - Total: 7.71 sq mi (19.96 km^{2})
  - Land: 6.92 sq mi (17.93 km^{2})
  - Water: 0.78 sq mi (2.03 km^{2}) 10.08%
- Elevation: 3.3 ft (1 m)

Population (2020)
  - Total: 8,301
  - Density: 1,199.4/sq mi (463.1/km^{2})
- Time zone: UTC−05:00 (Eastern (EST))
  - Summer (DST): UTC−04:00 (Eastern (EDT))
- FIPS code: 34-49560
- GNIS feature ID: 02389525

Mystic Island (also called Mystic Islands or Mystic) is an unincorporated community and census-designated place (CDP) located within Little Egg Harbor Township, in Ocean County, in the U.S. state of New Jersey. As of the 2020 United States census, the CDP's population was 8,301.

Mystic Island is a large, mostly waterfront development originally planned as a resort community that started in the early 1960s as a waterfront community with vacation bungalows. In the past few years, however, many of the original bungalows are slowly being replaced with much larger homes on pilings that are popular in nearby beach communities such as Long Beach Island.

== Early history ==
The area that is currently Mystic Island was once called "Hickory Island", and was serviced by the Tuckerton Railroad and one two-lane street named "Shore Road", which was later renamed "Radio Road" after the Tuckerton Wireless Tower.

The Tuckerton Wireless Tower (39.5585°N 74.3706°W) was built in 1912 by the German "Hochfrequenzmaschinen Aktiengesellschaft für drahtlose Telegraphie" company (The High Frequency Machine Corporation for Wireless Telegraphy, often referred to as HOMAG) when the present-day Mystic Island was called Hickory Island. The tower was used to communicate with an identical radio telegraph station in Eilvese, Germany starting on Jun 19, 1914, less than two weeks before the assassination of Archduke Ferdinand. The station continued to communicate with Eilvese until America entered World War I on April 6, 1917. It is rumored that it was used to send the message to order the attack by a German U-boat on the RMS Lusitania. After President Wilson's Declaration of Neutrality, the President ordered the US Navy to take over the station on Sep 9, 1914 to assure the neutrality of messages sent to and from the station; however, the station continued to be operated by German nationals employed by HOMAG and continued to communicate only with the Eilvese radio station. When America entered the war, all U.S. radio stations were seized and shut down by Executive Order. The Tuckerton Radio Station was assigned to the US Navy, which used it primarily to back-up the communications of the US Navy's main transatlantic radio station in New Brunswick, New Jersey. The remaining German personnel at Tuckerton became war prisoners and were replaced by Navy personnel when the U.S. entered the war. After the war, the Tuckerton Wireless Station was included in German war reparations paid to America. Shortly afterwards, it was sold to RCA, which operated it until 1948 as a backup to their Radio Central facility in Rocky Point, New York. In 1921, RCA installed two massive Alexanderson alternators, which were removed in 1948. For transatlantic communications, the radio station operated under the call signs WCI and WGG. For coastal communications, after World War I, the station operated under the callsign WSC. The 680-foot (820?) (865?) steel tower, anchored by three large concrete blocks, was taken down on December 27, 1955, or 1950. The three huge anchor blocks still exist today, in a backyard on North Ensign Drive, in the middle of South Ensign Drive, and Staysail Drive. Many smaller anchor blocks providing foundations for smaller towers that supported the umbrella antenna are still visible in the lagoons. Remains of the tower can be seen at the Giffordtown Museum.

=== Development ===
A postcard from the 1960s of W Playhouse Drive looking north, between Ship Drive and N Captains Drive

After the demise of the tower, RCA sold the Hickory Island property at a sum of $55,000 to Lagoon Parks, Inc., a land development company of the 1950s and 60s, whose corporate partners are now deceased. The development was named "Mystic Islands", plural, encompassing seven small islands where the waterways were filled in to produce buildable land. Construction began slowly in 1959. The lagoons were dredged up until the early 1970s, when it was stopped by the New Jersey Department of Environmental Protection with the passage of CAFRA I and CAFRA II. Several unfinished lagoons can still be seen along the west end of Calabreeze Way and on the Osborn Island section. Mystic Islands only encompasses all areas south of Calabreeze Way; locals commonly refer to surrounding neighborhoods and streets as part of the community.

The first sections to be completed were the Radio Road terminus, while the Twin Lakes Boulevard section was constructed well into the 1970s. The island currently known as "Osborn Island" was dubbed by its developers as "Oceanview", which was only accessible via a bridge on Radio Road. Up until the early 1990s, all homes part of the original were addressed by a confusing lot-and-block numbering system, which were eventually replaced with more conventional house numbers. Street signs were originally on wooden posts, with the names written vertically. They were slowly replaced with more conventional street signs, one on the corner of Twin Lakes Boulevard and Mountain Lake Drive still existed well into the late 2000s. Street signs in the Oceanview section were replaced by custom signs created by the Osborn Island Resident's Association.

Some of the original bases of the Tuckerton Wireless tower were never removed. One is located in the backyard of a home on North Ensign Drive, while two stand on the middle of both Staysail Drive and South Ensign Drive, in which roundabouts were built around the blocks. Some smaller bases are also found in surrounding lagoons and marshes.

==== Home designs ====
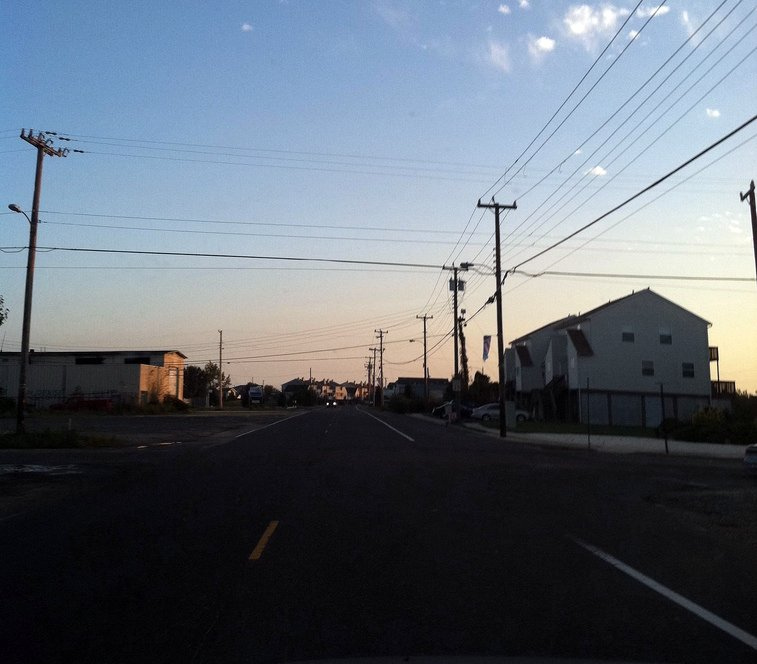
Radio Road near Playhouse drive, near the former site of the Tuckerton Wireless Tower.

The original home designs were basic bungalows, with 2 or 3 bedrooms and one bathroom, and a carport at the left side. The homes were intended to be sold as recreational or year round homes, as standard equipment included a furnace and Johns Manville R-7 Insulation. Over time, several more models were added, nearly a dozen during its boom period. Home designs included slab homes, raised homes, two-story, flat tops, raised roofs, etc. Two- and three-bedroom homes were also available. Model homes were located on Radio Road across from the Shops of Mystic Isle strip mall; the homes were later torn down to make way for the model homes for the Westwood development, all of which still stand and currently serve as commercial properties.

The homes were made in a warehouse on the intersection of Radio Road and Playhouse Drive, near the site of the Tuckerton Wireless tower. Buyers ordered the design by catalog, and the homes were delivered a week later. The model homes were located on Radio Road, across from the present-day "Shoppes of Mystic Isle" shopping center.

After the dredging of the lagoons was stopped, construction began on the non-waterfront section north of Calabreeze Way. The area east of Radio Road was named "Pulaski Village" and consisted of small, narrow homes, while the much larger section west of Radio Road, named "Westwood", contained suburban-style ranches and split-level homes. While these areas are not officially called "Mystic Islands", some homes of the original bungalow designs were constructed in these outlying areas, while at the same time, the larger, suburban homes were also offered on the original waterfront lots. However, tough economic times halted the development of the Westwood subdivision. In the early-1990s, development resumed in this unfinished area, when the empty lots were filled in with mid-size suburban homes built by several different developers. Homes on Oneida Lake Drive and Greenwood Lake Drive are part of the Noble Homes community titled "Fairwinds", while most homes from Mountain Lake Drive and north were dubbed "Drewes Landing". However, Drewes Landing was plagued with failed loans and racketeering, and in August 1995, one of the developers and investors, 35-year-old Joseph G. Paggi Jr. killed himself after he failed to pay back loans for the development.

== Geography ==
According to the United States Census Bureau, Mystic Island had a total area of 7.701 square miles (19.95 km^{2}), including 6.925 square miles (17.94 km^{2}) of land and 0.776 square miles (2.01 km^{2}) of water (10.08%).

== Demographics ==
Historical population
Census	Pop.	Note	%±
1980	4,929		—
1990	7,400		50.1%
2000	8,694		17.5%
2010	8,493		−2.3%
2020	8,301		−2.3%
Population sources: 1950 1960 1970; 1980 1990 2000; 2010 2020

Mystic Island first appeared as a census designated place in the 1980 U.S. census.

=== Racial and ethnic composition ===
Mystic Island CDP, New Jersey – Racial and ethnic composition Note: the US Census treats Hispanic/Latino as an ethnic category. This table excludes Latinos from the racial categories and assigns them to a separate category. Hispanics/Latinos may be of any race.
Race / Ethnicity (NH = Non-Hispanic)	Pop 2000	Pop 2010	Pop 2020	% 2000	% 2010	% 2020
White alone (NH)	8,211	7,810	7,105	94.44%	91.96%	85.59%
Black or African American alone (NH)	56	77	140	0.64%	0.91%	1.69%
Native American or Alaska Native alone (NH)	18	12	10	0.21%	0.14%	0.12%
Asian alone (NH)	46	93	79	0.53%	1.10%	0.95%
Native Hawaiian or Pacific Islander alone (NH)	1	1	9	0.01%	0.01%	0.11%
Other race alone (NH)	7	5	20	0.08%	0.06%	0.24%
Mixed race or Multiracial (NH)	75	70	307	0.86%	0.82%	3.70%
Hispanic or Latino (any race)	280	425	631	3.22%	5.00%	7.60%
Total	8,694	8,493	8,301	100.00%	100.00%	100.00%

=== 2020 census ===
As of the 2020 census, Mystic Island had a population of 8,301. The median age was 52.3 years. 15.7% of residents were under the age of 18 and 28.3% of residents were 65 years of age or older. For every 100 females there were 95.4 males, and for every 100 females age 18 and over there were 93.9 males age 18 and over.

92.1% of residents lived in urban areas, while 7.9% lived in rural areas.

There were 3,536 households in Mystic Island, of which 20.8% had children under the age of 18 living in them. Of all households, 47.5% were married-couple households, 18.8% were households with a male householder and no spouse or partner present, and 25.3% were households with a female householder and no spouse or partner present. About 29.8% of all households were made up of individuals and 17.4% had someone living alone who was 65 years of age or older.

There were 5,177 housing units, of which 31.7% were vacant. The homeowner vacancy rate was 2.4% and the rental vacancy rate was 7.1%.

=== 2010 census ===
The 2010 United States census counted 8,493 people, 3,490 households, and 2,331 families in the CDP. The population density was 1,226.5 people per square mile (473.6 people/km^{2}). There were 5,185 housing units at an average density of 748.8 units per square mile (289.1 units/km^{2}). The racial makeup was 95.05% (8,073) White, 0.94% (80) Black or African American, 0.19% (16) Native American, 1.10% (93) Asian, 0.01% (1) Pacific Islander, 1.51% (128) from other races, and 1.20% (102) from two or more races. Hispanic or Latino of any race were 5.00% (425) of the population.

Of the 3,490 households, 22.8% had children under the age of 18; 51.7% were married couples living together; 10.5% had a female householder with no husband present and 33.2% were non-families. Of all households, 27.1% were made up of individuals and 14.3% had someone living alone who was 65 years of age or older. The average household size was 2.39 and the average family size was 2.89.

19.2% of the population were under the age of 18, 6.7% from 18 to 24, 21.0% from 25 to 44, 30.5% from 45 to 64, and 22.5% who were 65 years of age or older. The median age was 47.2 years. For every 100 females, the population had 93.6 males. For every 100 females ages 18 and older there were 91.6 males.

=== 2000 census ===
As of the 2000 United States census there were 8,694 people, 3,485 households, and 2,453 families residing in the CDP. The population density was 440.5 people/km^{2} (1,141 people/mi^{2}). There were 4,962 housing units at an average density of 251.4 units/km^{2} (651 units/mi^{2}). The racial makeup of the CDP was 96.51% White, 0.68% African American, 0.31% Native American, 0.53% Asian, 0.01% Pacific Islander, 0.87% from other races, and 1.08% from two or more races. Hispanic or Latino of any race were 3.22% of the population.

There were 3,485 households, of which 26.3% had children under the age of 18 living with them, 56.2% were married couples living together, 9.6% had a female householder with no husband present, and 29.6% were non-families. 23.9% of all households were made up of individuals, and 12.7% had someone living alone who was 65 years of age or older. The average household size was 2.45 and the average family size was 2.89.

In the CDP the population was spread out, with 22.1% under the age of 18, 5.7% from 18 to 24, 25.7% from 25 to 44, 24.5% from 45 to 64, and 22.0% who were 65 years of age or older. The median age was 43 years. For every 100 females, there were 93.4 males. For every 100 females age 18 and over, there were 90.9 males.

The median income for a household in the CDP was $41,674, and the median income for a family was $47,372. Males had a median income of $38,654 versus $27,420 for females. The per capita income for the CDP was $18,737. About 4.4% of families and 7.8% of the population were below the poverty line, including 13.3% of those under age 18 and 3.0% of those age 65 or over.

== Recreation ==
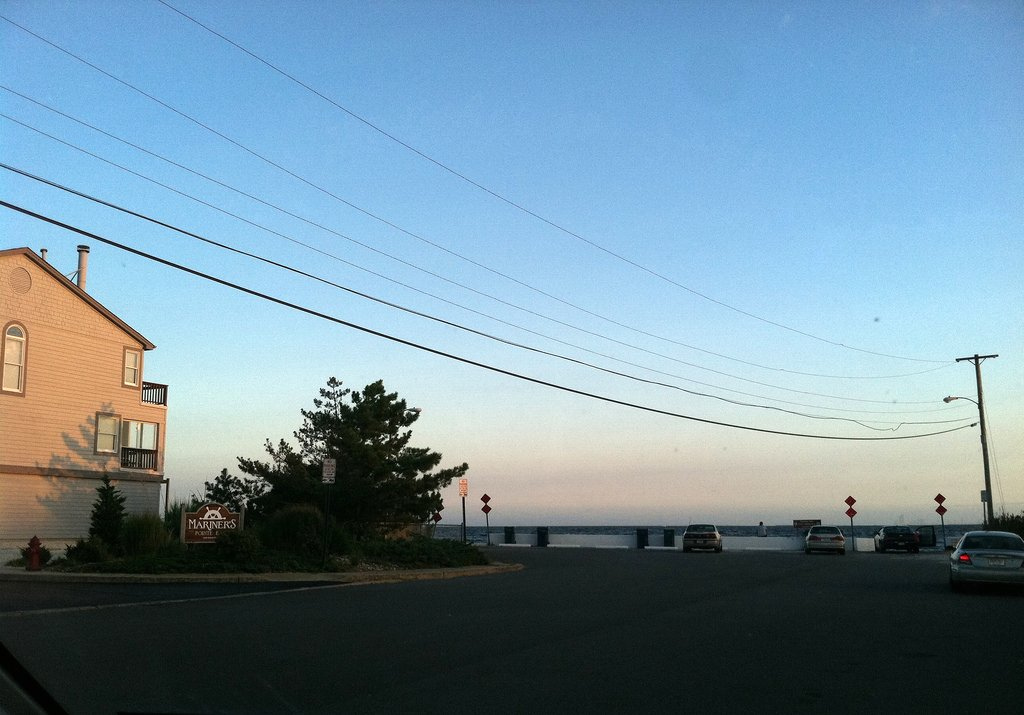
The Graveling Point beach at the end of Radio Road on Osborn Island. The Atlantic City skyline can be seen at the bottom right corner.

During the boom period of Mystic Island, there were several social centers and amenities. In the Oceanview section of the resort community, there was formerly a 9-hole golf course, bathing beach, and a small amusement park. The golf course was closed and is now a preserved forest, while the amusement park also went out of business and no longer exists. However, the beach was rebuilt and reopened as part of a townhouse community; the bathing beach is currently known as "Graveling Point". A circular building at the intersection of Radio Road and Bayview Drive was originally constructed as a "Boatel", where boaters could dock, eat, and even sleep. This concept didn't last, and it later became a boat sales showroom, later a pizza parlor, and then a bar named "The Rotunda". It is currently home to the Living Water Christian Center.

Diagonally from the Boatel was "The Playhouse", on Playhouse Drive between Radio Road and S. Captains Drive, originally a welcome center which featured gift shops, an Olympic-sized saltwater swimming pool and marina. The building was eventually turned into a restaurant called the "Mystic Island Casino", which burned down in the 1970s, and opened in a new building on Mathistown Road, which still operates to this day. The original site is now home to condominiums, the residents of which have exclusive rights to use the former marina.

The building currently home to the Little Egg Harbor Community Center on Calabreeze Way was originally a shop functioning as part of the prefabrication process. It later became a Roman Catholic church known as "St. Michael the Archangel". In 2002, it was sold to the Township of Little Egg Harbor and is currently used as the township's community center.

== Images ==
- "[tower]". Archived from the original on September 28, 2007.
- "tuckertontower.jpg". Archived from the original on August 4, 2007.
- "[anchor block]". Archived from the original on September 28, 2007.
