= Bead Wreck Site =

- U.S. National Register of Historic Places
- New Jersey Register of Historic Places
- Nearest city: New Gretna, New Jersey
- Area: less than one acre
- Built: unknown
- NRHP reference No.: 88001899
- NJRHP No.: 744

Significant dates
- Added to NRHP: October 18, 1988
- Designated NJRHP: August 29, 1988

The Bead Wreck Site is located in the New Gretna section of Bass River Township, Burlington County, New Jersey, United States. The wreck is believed to date to the American Revolution, and is named after the glass trade beads that were found on the wreck by divers. The site was added to the National Register of Historic Places on October 18, 1988.

== See also ==
- National Register of Historic Places listings in Burlington County, New Jersey
