= Bass River Township School District =

School district in Burlington County, New Jersey, US

Address
- 11 North Maple Avenue New Gretna, Burlington County, New Jersey, 08224; United States
- Coordinates: 39.59235°N 74.451691°W

District information
- Grades: PreK-6
- Superintendent: Siobhan Grayson
- Business administrator: Nicholas Brown
- Schools: 1

Students and staff
- Enrollment: 106 (as of 2018–19)
- Faculty: 12.8 FTEs
- Student–teacher ratio: 8.3:1

Other information
- District Factor Group: CD
- Website: www.bassriverschooldistrict.org
Ind.	Per pupil	District spending	Rank (*)	K-6 average	%± vs. average
1A	Total Spending	$21,668	52	$18,891	14.7%
1	Budgetary Cost	15,927	41	13,649	16.7%
2	Classroom Instruction	9,358	35	8,366	11.9%
6	Support Services	2,787	47	2,161	29.0%
8	Administrative Cost	1,839	44	1,467	25.4%
10	Operations & Maintenance	1,835	43	1,552	18.2%
13	Extracurricular Activities	107	39	39	174.4%
16	Median Teacher Salary	54,119	17	57,437
Data from NJDoE 2014 Taxpayers' Guide to Education Spending. *Of K-6 districts with any number of students. Lowest spending=1; Highest=59

The Bass River Township School District is a non-operating public school district that serves students from Bass River Township, in Burlington County, in the U.S. state of New Jersey. Starting with the 2020-21 school year, the district is non-operating and all students attend the schools of the Little Egg Harbor Township School District for K-6 and of the Pinelands Regional School District for grades 7-12.

Based on the results of a study performed by the Southern Regional Institute and Educational Technology Training Center of Stockton University, and in the wake of declining enrollment and rising costs, the district decided to send all of its PreK-6 students to the Little Egg Harbor Township School District, starting in the 2020-21 school year. The board of education will oversee what becomes a non-operating district.

As of the 2018–19 school year, the district, comprising one school, had an enrollment of 106 students and 12.8 classroom teachers (on an FTE basis), for a student–teacher ratio of 8.3:1. In the 2016–17 school year, Bass River had the 10th-smallest enrollment of any school district in the state, with 102 students.

The district is classified by the New Jersey Department of Education as being in District Factor Group "CD", the sixth-highest of eight groupings. District Factor Groups organize districts statewide to allow comparison by common socioeconomic characteristics of the local districts. From lowest socioeconomic status to highest, the categories are A, B, CD, DE, FG, GH, I and J.

Students in seventh through twelfth grades attend the schools of the Pinelands Regional School District, which also serves students from Eagleswood Township, Little Egg Harbor Township and Tuckerton Borough. Schools in the district (with 2018–19 enrollment data from the National Center for Education Statistics) are Pinelands Regional Junior High School with 811 students in grades 7-9 and Pinelands Regional High School with 744 students in grades 10–12. The district's board of education includes nine members directly elected by the residents of the constituent municipalities to three-year terms on a staggered basis, with three seats up for election each year. Bass River Township is allocated one of the nine seats.

== Schools ==
Bass River Township Elementary School served 106 students in grades PreK-6 (as of the 2018–19 school year, per the National Center for Education Statistics)

== Administration ==
Core members of the district's administration are:

- Siobhan Grayson, superintendent
- Nicholas Brown, business administrator and board secretary

== Board of education ==
The district's board of education, comprised of five members, sets policy and oversees the fiscal and educational operation of the district through its administration. As a Type II school district, the board's trustees are elected directly by voters to serve three-year terms of office on a staggered basis, with either one or two seats up for election each year held (since 2012) as part of the November general election. The board appoints a superintendent to oversee the district's day-to-day operations and a business administrator to supervise the business functions of the district.
