= Andy Boswell =

American baseball player (1873–1936)

- Pitcher
- Born: September 26, 1873; New Gretna in Bass River Township, New Jersey
- Died: February 3, 1936 (aged 62); Ocean City, New Jersey
- Batted: Unknown Threw: Right

MLB debut
- May 10, 1895, for the New York Giants

Last MLB appearance
- September 30, 1895, for the Washington Senators

MLB statistics
- Win–loss record: 3–4
- Earned run average: 5.91
- Strikeouts: 30
- Stats at Baseball Reference

Teams
- New York Giants (1895); Washington Senators (1895)

Andrew Cottrell Boswell (September 6, 1873 – February 3, 1936) was a Major League Baseball pitcher. After playing at the University of Pennsylvania he played for the Washington Senators and New York Giants of the National League during the 1895 season. He finished his career in the Western League in 1896.

Boswell left baseball and became an attorney, residing in Ocean City, New Jersey.

He was elected as a Republican from Cape May County, New Jersey to the New Jersey General Assembly, serving in 1920 and 1921.

== Sources ==
- Career statistics from Baseball Reference · Baseball Reference (Minors) · Retrosheet · Baseball Almanac
