= Port Republic Historic District (Port Republic, New Jersey) =

Historic district in New Jersey, US

- U.S. National Register of Historic Places
- U.S. Historic district
- New Jersey Register of Historic Places
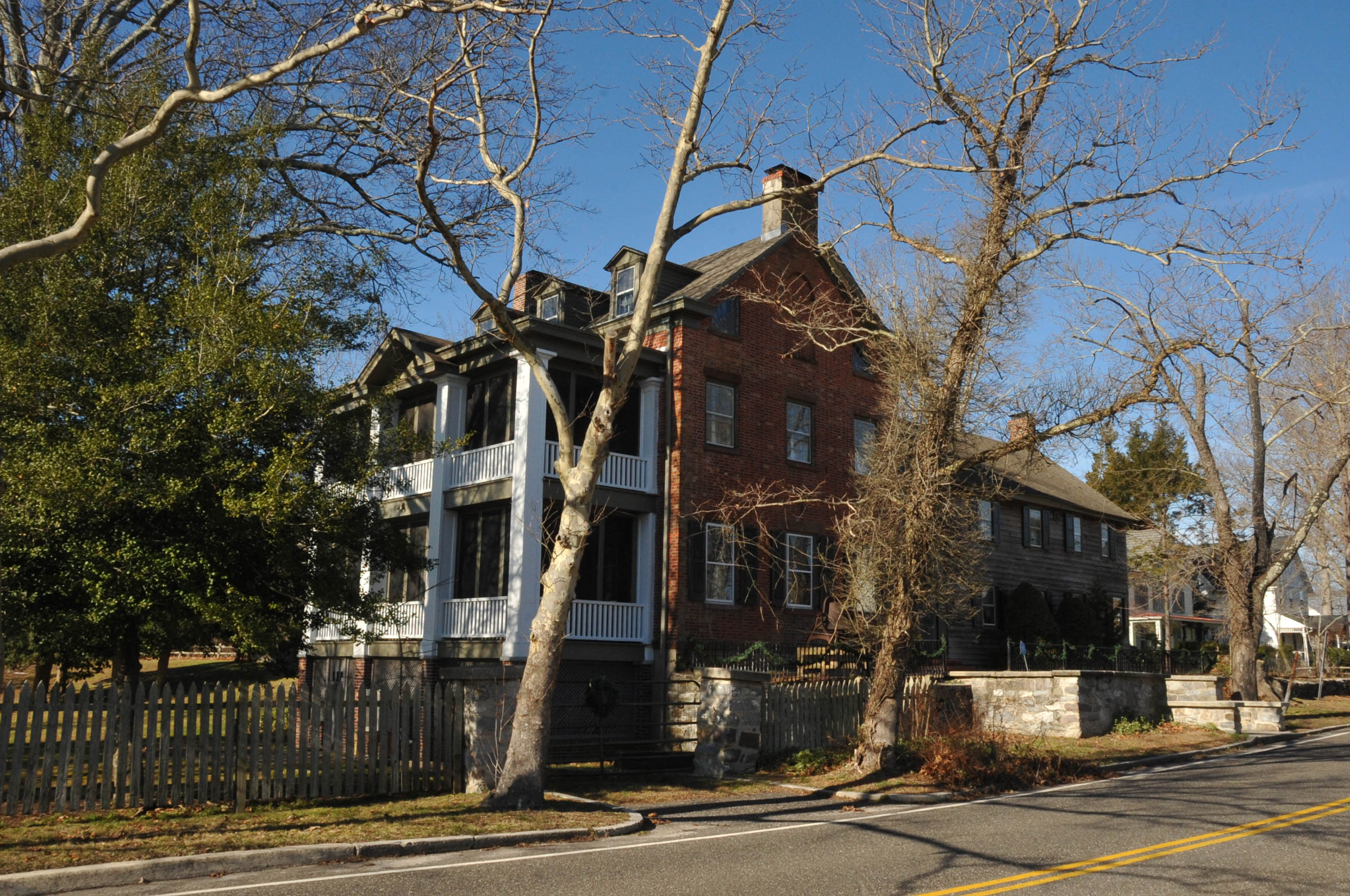
- Franklin Inn and Store

- Location within Atlantic County, New Jersey Location within New Jersey Location within the United States
- Location: Roughly bounded by Mill Street, Clark's Landing Road, Adams Avenue, Port Republic-Smithville Road and Riverside Drive, Port Republic, New Jersey
- Coordinates: 39°31′15″N 74°29′35″W
- Area: 100 acres (40 ha)
- Built: 1774
- Architect: Multiple
- Architectural style: Greek Revival, Late Victorian, Colonial
- NRHP reference No.: 91000596
- NJRHP No.: 388

Significant dates
- Added to NRHP: May 16, 1991
- Designated NJRHP: April 1, 1991

The Port Republic Historic District is a 100-acre (40 ha) historic district located in the city of Port Republic in Atlantic County, New Jersey. It was listed on the National Register of Historic Places on May 16, 1991, for its significance in architecture, engineering, industry, and maritime history. The district has 110 contributing buildings, including the individually listed Amanda Blake Store, and four other contributing sites.

== History and description ==
The oldest part of the Franklin Inn and Store was constructed around 1750. The inn might be named after the New Jersey colonial governor, William Franklin, a frequent visitor. It was later owned by Sea Captain Micajah Smith in the late 18th century. The larger brick section was built around 1815 by Jonas Miller. It was documented by the Historic American Buildings Survey (HABS) in 1940. The Amanda Blake Store was built in 1884 and served as a general store and post office. St. Paul's Methodist Church was completed in 1871 and features Gothic architecture and Romanesque architecture.

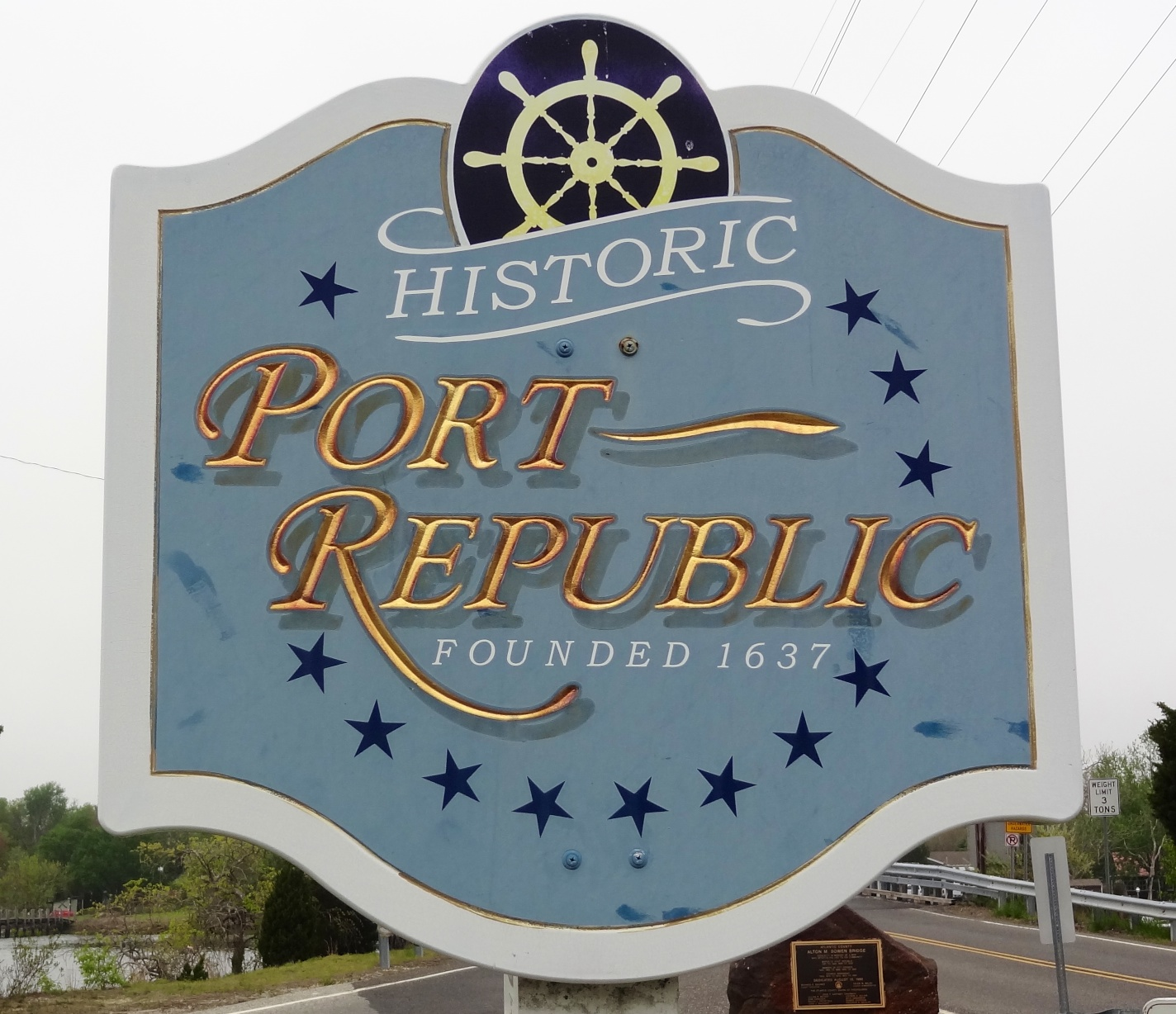
Historic Port Republic sign

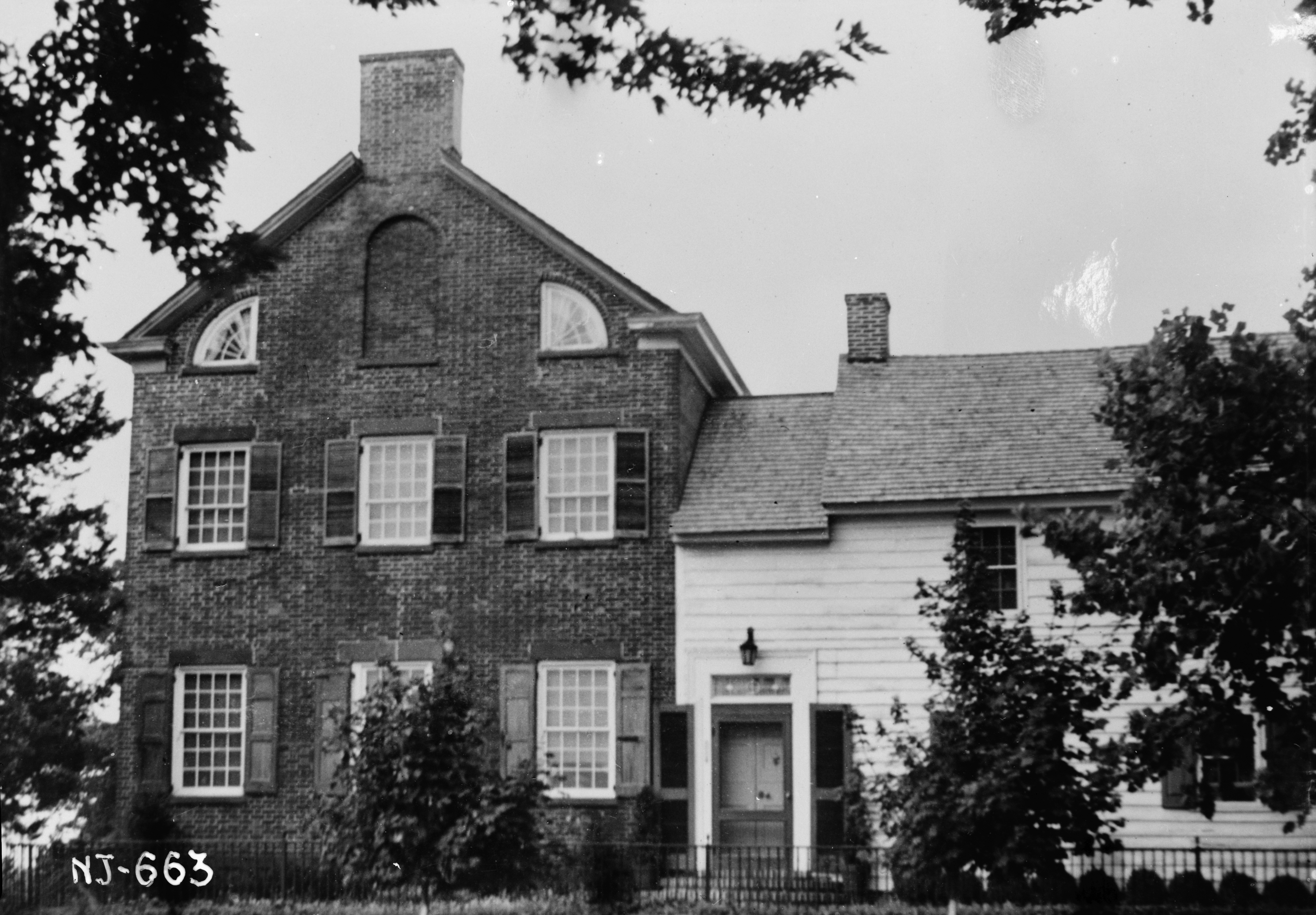
HABS photo of the Franklin Inn and Store from 1940

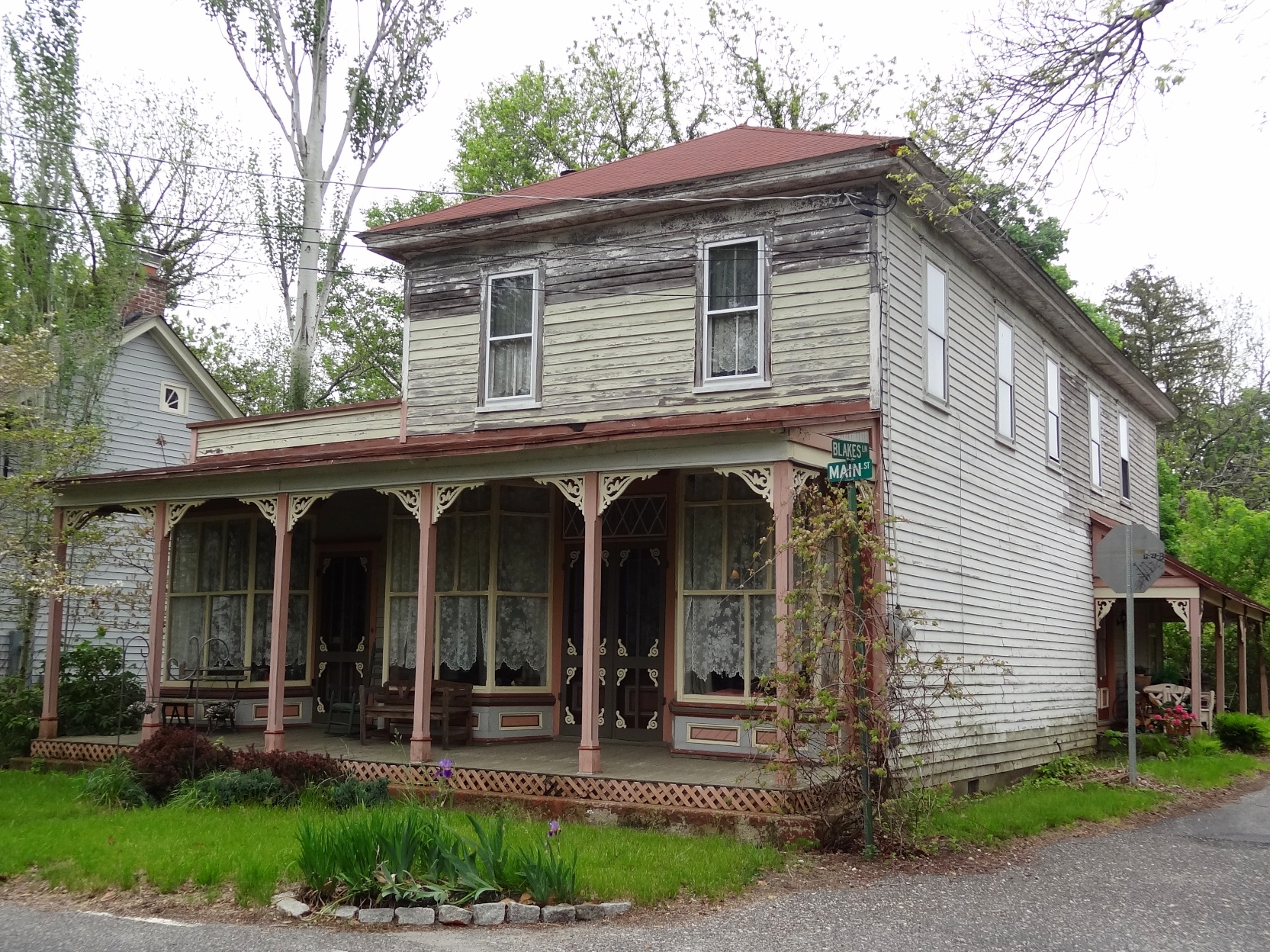
Amanda Blake Store

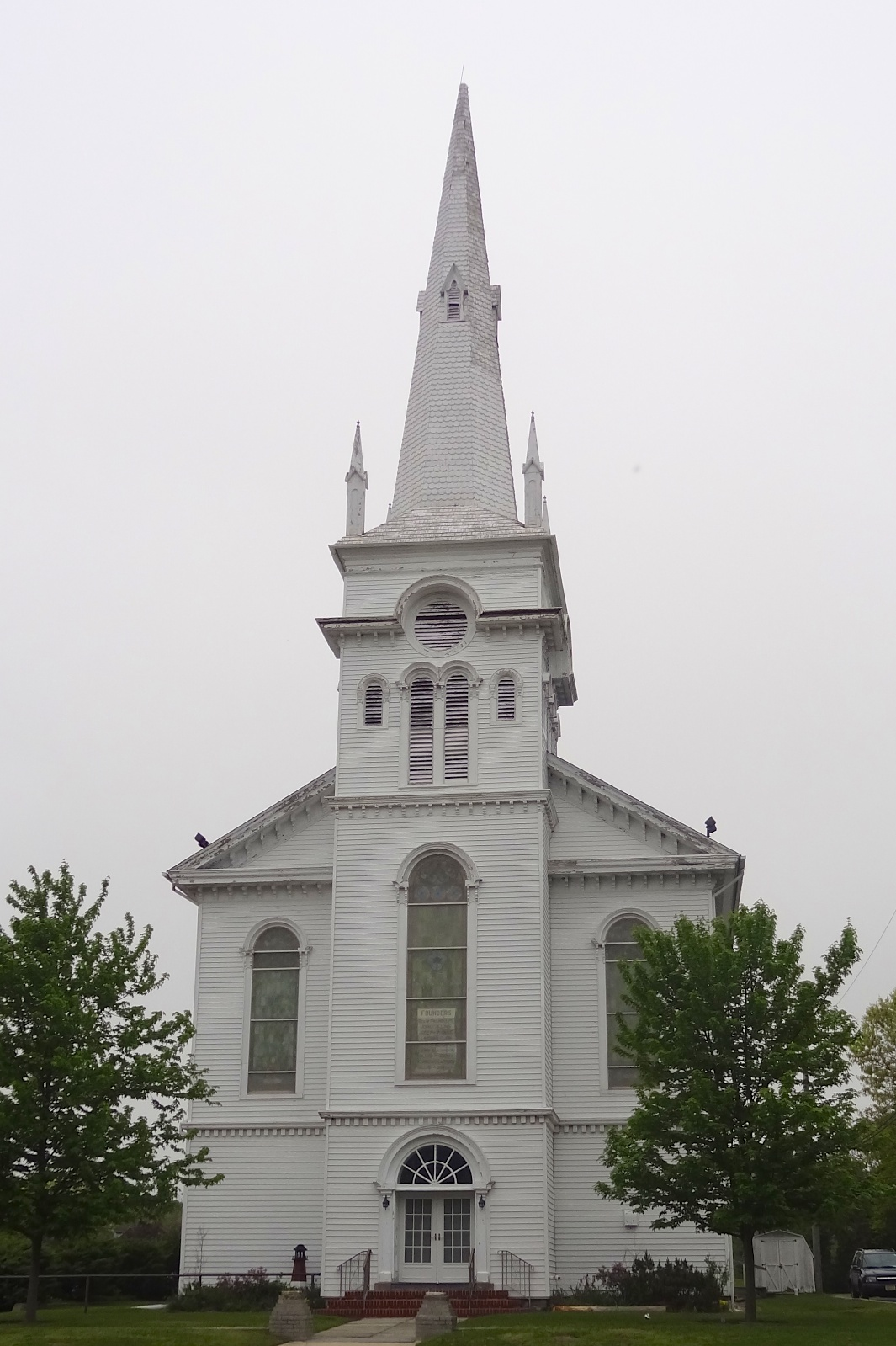
St. Paul's Methodist Church

== See also ==
- National Register of Historic Places listings in Atlantic County, New Jersey
