= Amanda Blake Store =

- U.S. National Register of Historic Places
- U.S. Historic district – Contributing property
- New Jersey Register of Historic Places
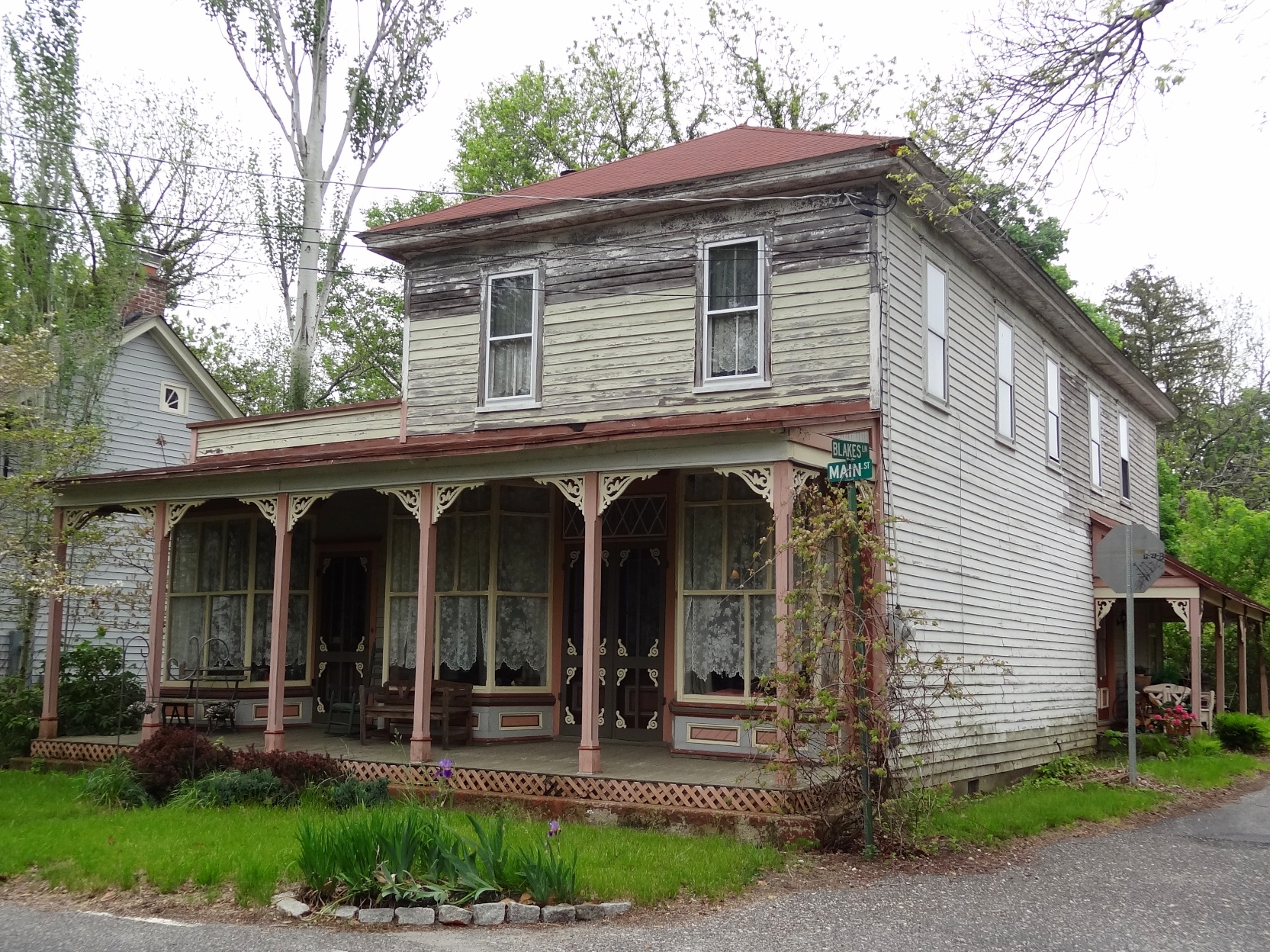

- Location within Atlantic County, New Jersey Location within New Jersey Location within the United States
- Location: 104 Main Street, Port Republic, New Jersey
- Coordinates: 39°31′9″N 74°29′29″W
- Built: 1884
- Architectural style: Victorian
- Part of: Port Republic Historic District (ID91000596)
- NRHP reference No.: 79001469
- NJRHP No.: 387

Significant dates
- Added to NRHP: January 25, 1979
- Designated CP: May 16, 1991
- Designated NJRHP: September 5, 1978

The Amanda Blake Store is a historic building located at 104 Main Street in the city of Port Republic in Atlantic County, New Jersey. Built in 1884 as a general store, it was added to the National Register of Historic Places on January 25, 1979, for its significance in commerce and social history. It is now a privately owned house. The building was listed as a contributing property of the Port Republic Historic District in 1991.

== History and description ==
The two-story frame Victorian store was built in 1884 for William Blake, a farmer from Chestnut Neck, and his daughter Amanda Blake, after whom the store is named. She became a milliner and operated the store. She was also the postmistress, from 1918 to 1940, for the post office located in the store. In the evenings, the store was used as a social gathering place, and a meeting place for the Independent Order of Mechanics.

== See also ==
- National Register of Historic Places listings in Atlantic County, New Jersey
