= Strafing of the Little Egg Harbor Intermediate School =

2004 military accident in New Jersey, United States

Coordinates: 39.6290°N 74.3253°W

- Date: November 3, 2004
- Time: Between 9:02 and 11:00 PM Eastern Time Zone
- Location: Little Egg Harbor Township, New Jersey
- Injuries: 0

The strafing of the Little Egg Harbor Intermediate School was an accidental strafing incident that occurred in Little Egg Harbor Township, New Jersey, United States. On the evening of November 3, 2004, the pilot of a U.S. Air National Guard F-16 fighter jet unintentionally discharged the aircraft’s 20mm cannon while attempting to operate an aircraft-mounted laser during a training mission, striking the school. No injuries were reported, and the aircraft returned to base without further incident.

The aircraft was flying within the Warren Grove Gunnery Range, when the pilot attempted to fix the jet’s laser-targeting pod onto a target to the side of the aircraft during a close air support maneuver. However, while trying to target and maneuver, the pilot inadvertently fired the internally-mounted M61 Vulcan cannon, shooting rounds straight ahead. The cannon rounds flew over 4 miles (6.4 km) and struck the school, causing notable damage.

== Incident ==
On the evening of Wednesday, November 3, 2004, two F-16C Fighting Falcons from the 113th Wing of the District of Columbia Air National Guard, based at Andrews Air Force Base in Maryland, departed from the base on a training mission over the Warren Grove Gunnery Range by around 9:02 P.M. in Barnegat Township, New Jersey, at an altitude of approximately 7,000 feet (2,100 m). The mission, piloted by Maj. Roberto Balzano and wing-manned by training instructor Maj. Kirk Pierce, was meant to train pilots on High-Angle Strafing, in order to provide enhanced air support for ground troops in Iraq; this was Maj. Balzano’s first time attempting such a maneuver.

The laser for the F-16’s externally-mounted targeting pod shared the same trigger as its internally-mounted 20mm M61 Vulcan cannon; when the cannon was active, half-pressing the trigger activated the laser, while fully pressing the trigger activated the cannon. A recent software change of the targeting pod also allowed it to stabilize and lock in on a target when the avionics were turned to the Strafe Sub-Mode in Air-to-Ground Mode.

Maj. Balzano had utilized the laser of the targeting pod heavily during the mission, using it 17 times to illuminate the training strafe target at Warren Grove before attempting a final attack run. As Maj. Balzano flew approximately 8 miles north of the training target, he began his final run with a diving hard left turn and pulled the trigger, intending to fire the laser at the target while closing in; when doing this, Maj. Balzano briefly looked over his shoulder and fully pressed the trigger, firing both the laser and Vulcan cannon, discharging 27 rounds of inert 20mm ammunition. Maj. Balzano reported the discharge to Maj. Pierce, who reprimanded him for his use of the laser. Both would return to Andrews AFB later that night, without further incident.

The rounds flew on a projectile path in a south-easternly direction from Warren Grove Range, overshooting the Garden State Parkway before falling down and impacting both a sparsely-inhabited wooden area and the Little Egg Harbor Intermediate School at approximately 10:15 P.M., four miles away from the range. Of the 27 rounds fired, eight of the rounds struck the roof of the school and five landed in the school’s parking lot, damaging both. The remaining 14 are believed to have landed in the wooden area with minimal damage.

Four members of the school’s nighttime janitorial staff were present in the building when the rounds impacted, with the sound of the impacts making one of the janitors to believe that someone was walking on the roof of the school and prompting them to call the police. Little Egg Harbor Police arrived shortly thereafter, but found no evidence of an intruder in the dark, and left after recording the incident.

Janitors would not discover the damage until the next morning, when they found holes in the ceilings and floors of multiple classrooms, offices, and a hallway, alongside the eight cannon rounds that caused this damage and the five rounds in the parking lot. Additional damage was reported on desks inside the classrooms, and the brick exterior of the school building.

== Aftermath ==
=== Repairs ===
At the time of the incident, the Little Egg Harbor Intermediate School had 970 students enrolled, in grades 3 through 6; however, no one besides the janitorial staff was present that night, and students at all Little Egg Harbor schools had been on a four-day vacation since that afternoon for the New Jersey Education Association Convention on Thursday and Friday.

The school was repaired over the four-day break. When students returned to the school on Monday the 8th, there was live coverage from major news networks.

A series of funding referendums for multiple school districts were held statewide on December 12, 2006, in which the LEHSD was approved additional funding for completing renovations to Little Egg Harbor Intermediate School.

In 2009, the school was renovated into a K-6 school and was renamed to the Frog Pond Elementary School.

=== Settlement with U.S. Air Force ===
On November 1, 2006, the Little Egg Harbor School District (LEHSD) and the United States Air Force announced that a settlement had been reached, where the district would receive $519,070.70 to cover damages caused in the incident, less than the $900,000 that LEHSD superintendent Frank Kasyan had indicated would be needed to cover the costs of assessments and repairs.
