= Strafing =

Aircraft ground attack using guns

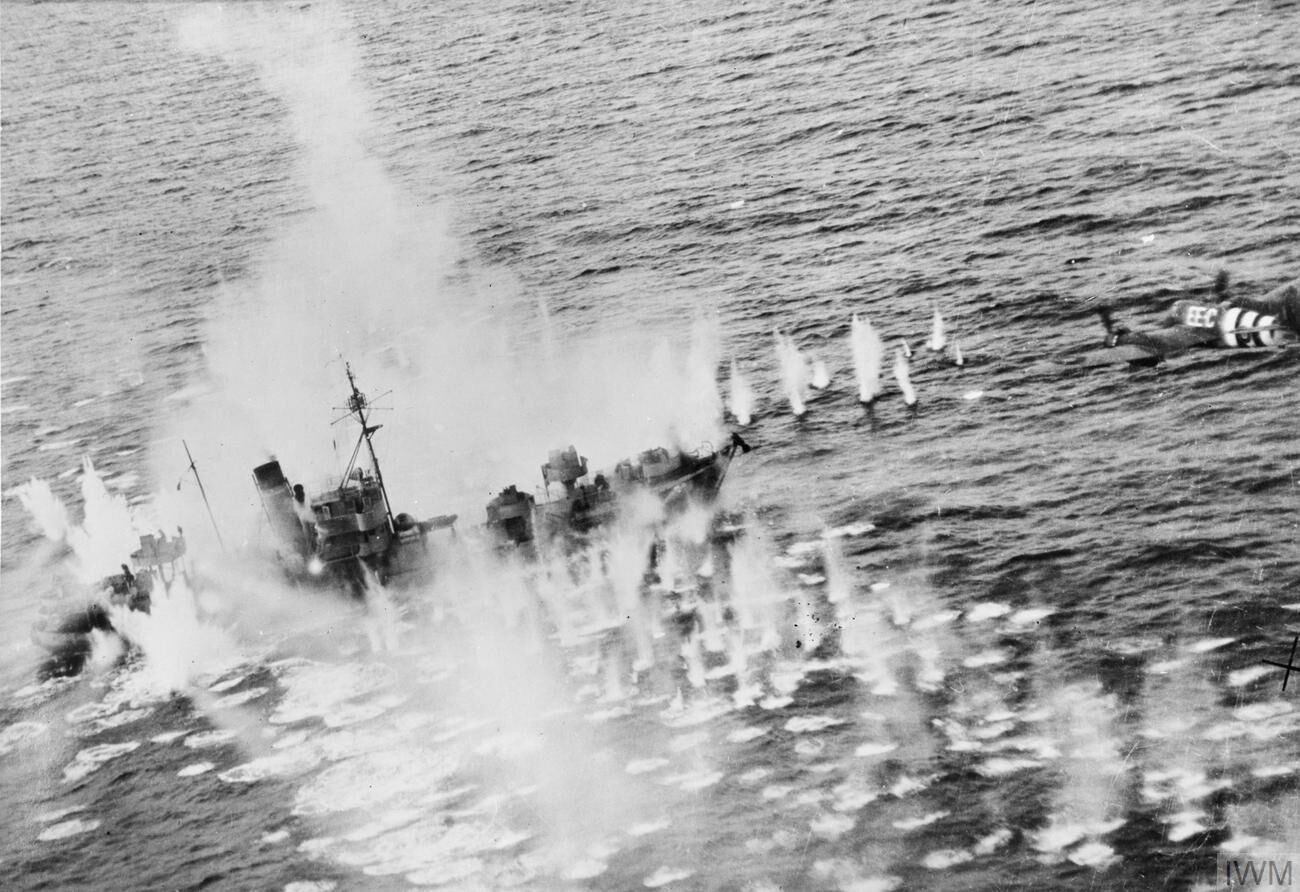
Beaufighters strafing a Vorpostenboot, 1944

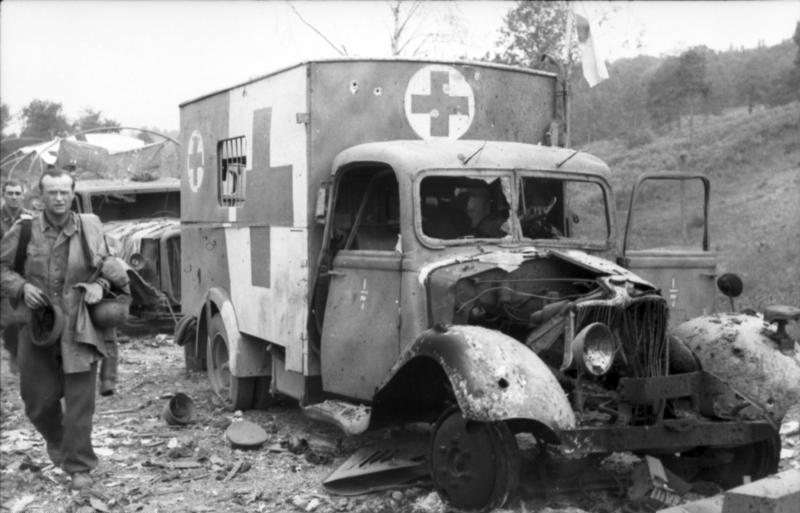
A German vehicle column destroyed by ground-attack aircraft close to Arnhem, 23 September 1944

Strafing is the military practice of attacking ground targets from low-flying aircraft using aircraft-mounted automatic weapons. Less commonly, the term is used by extension to describe high-speed firing runs by any land or naval craft such as fast boats, using smaller-caliber weapons and targeting stationary or slowly-moving targets.

== Etymology ==
The word is an adaptation of German strafen (pronounced [ˈʃtʁaːfn̩]), to punish, specifically from the humorous adaptation of the German anti-British slogan Gott strafe England (May God punish England), dating back to World War I.

== Description ==
U.S Navy Vought F4U Corsair strafing Imperial Japanese Shipping during the Second World War

Guns used in strafing range in caliber from 7.62–14.5 mm (0.300–0.571 in) machine guns, to 20–40 mm (0.79–1.57 in) autocannon or rotary cannon. Although ground attack using automatic weapons fire is very often accompanied with bombing or rocket fire, the term strafing does not specifically include the last two.

The term strafing can cover either fixed guns, or aimable (flexible) guns. Fixed guns firing directly ahead tend to be more predominant on fixed wing aircraft, while helicopters tend to use gimballed weapons which can be fired in many different directions independent of the direction the aircraft is pointing in (in most cases, flexible guns on a fixed wing aircraft are for defense purposes only, although they can sometimes be used to fire on ground targets to limited effect).

A-10 Thunderbolt-II 30mm GAU-8 cannon conducting a strafing run against suspected Taliban machine-gun crew, footage captured by overhead U.S military-operated reconnaissance drone, Afghanistan

Some fixed wing aircraft, like fighter-bombers, are capable of flying either air-combat missions or ground attack missions (P-47 Thunderbolt), while others are dedicated ground-attack types (Il-2 Sturmovik). In cases where an aircraft is capable of both types of combat, when it is assigned to a ground attack role, and thus expected to be using the guns mostly for strafing, the fixed weapons are often mounted so that the convergence point is lower and at a greater range than would be used for air combat. This is helpful because it allows the pilot to aim at a target without having to dive towards the ground as steeply, decreasing the risk of collision with the ground and increasing the amount of firing time available before having to pull up, and it also increases the range from the target, helping avoid anti-aircraft fire and potential damage from exploding targets. Consequently, several types of aircraft-mounted gun pods like the Soviet SPPU-22 allowed for a mechanical depression of their barrels.

A USAF A-10C Thunderbolt II combat exercise at Nevada Test & Training Ground against hard targets

Because of the low altitude and relatively low airspeed required for accurate strafing, it is very risky for the pilot, who is exposed not only to the risk of flight-into-terrain and obstacles such as power lines, but also to anti-aircraft weapons, including surface-to-air missiles (both vehicle mounted and hand-held), anti-aircraft artillery and small caliber weapons fire (such as machine guns and small arms). Planes purposely designed for ground attack may include additional armour around and underneath the cockpit and other vulnerable areas such as engines to protect the pilot and key flight components, while aircraft designed mostly for air combat tend to have most of their armor placed to protect directly ahead or to the rear, where fire from other aircraft is most likely, leaving them more vulnerable to fire from directly below or to the sides, where much ground fire often comes from.

== History ==
=== World War I ===
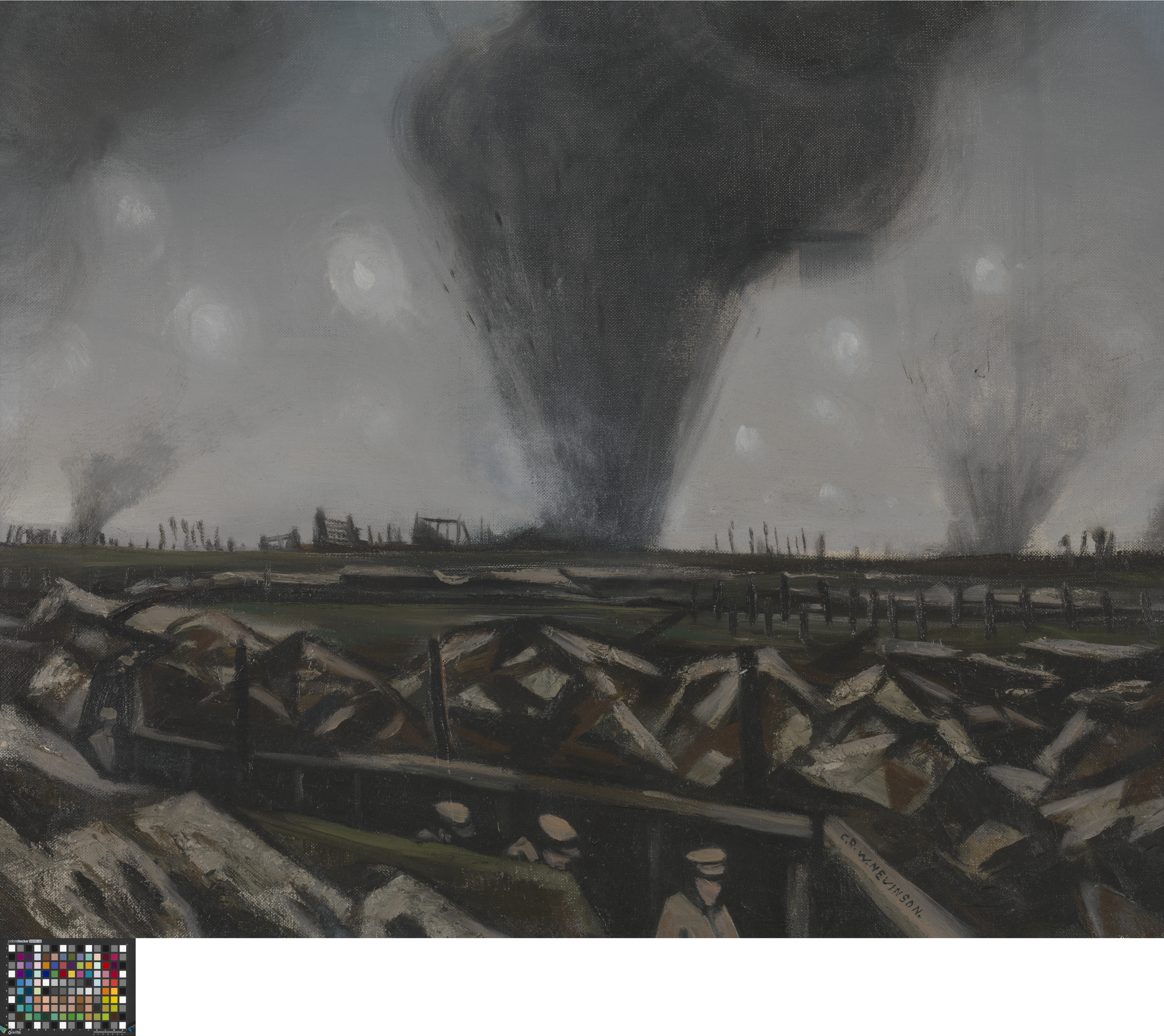
The Strafing, C. R. W. Nevinson, 1916, collection Museum of Fine Arts, Ghent

While the earliest use of military aircraft was for observation and directing of artillery, strafing was frequently practised in World War I. Trenches and supply columns were routinely attacked from the air in the second half of the war. Strafing with machine guns was used when precision was needed (facing small targets), but non-strafing attack methods (primarily small bombs) were preferred for larger targets, area targets, or when low-altitude flying was too risky.

The German army was the first to introduce a class of aircraft specially designed for strafing, the ground-attack aircraft. Planes built specifically for strafing include the German World War I Junkers J.I, which was armored to protect it from ground-based gunfire. The Junkers J.I. had two downward-facing machine guns that were used for strafing.

=== World War II ===
These developments continued through World War II with dedicated aircraft including the concept of the heavily protected cockpit or "bathtub" to permit the pilot to survive counterfire from anti-aircraft batteries.

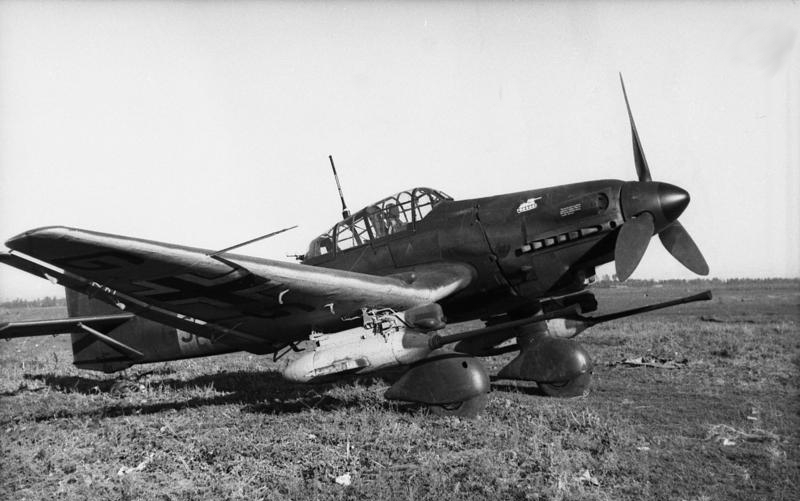
A Ju 87 G with its BK 3,7 guns in gun pods

The Luftwaffe's best strafing plane was the Junkers Ju 87 Stuka. The Ju 87 G variant had two Rheinmetall-Borsig 37 mm (1.5 in) Flak 18 guns each mounted under the wing.

For the RAF, the best ground attack plane was the Hawker Hurricane II. It was armed with four 20 mm (0.79 in) wing-mounted cannon. The Hawker Typhoon and its derivative Hawker Tempest were used in the later stages of the war. They also had four 20 mm (0.79 in) cannons, while also being able to carry up to 8 "60 lb" RP-3 rockets.

For the US, the Republic P-47 Thunderbolt was one of the key ground attack planes. It was armed with eight .50 calibre (12.7 mm) machine guns. Another aircraft that was important in that role was the North American B-25 Mitchell. It was used for low-altitude strafing runs in the Pacific War.

The Russian Ilyushin IL-2 Sturmovik was one of the key Russian ground attack planes. It had heavy armour around the engine, underside and canopy. It was armed with 20, 23, or 37 mm (0.79, 0.91, or 1.46 in) cannon, depending on the model.

An RCAF Spitfire of 412 Squadron piloted by Charley Fox strafed the command car of Erwin Rommel on 17 July 1944 near Sainte-Foy-de-Montgommery, affecting his possible participation in the 20 July 1944 Operation Valkyrie coup.

=== Postwar ===
In the 1950s, during the Korean War (1950–1953), US Air Force planes strafed targets deep behind the front line and had a perceptible impact on the progress of the ground war, but the concept of strafing was already in decline.

In the 1960s and 1970s, when precision-guided weapons became widespread, strafing temporarily fell out of favor as unnecessarily risky and some American fighter aircraft or attack aircraft (such as the F-4 Phantom II and A-6 Intruder) then did not have built-in autocannons or machine guns. In the Vietnam War, that was found to be a deficiency, and improvised "gunships" had to be used in strafing missions. Gunships like the AC-130 proved to be devastating defenders of besieged US Special Forces camps.

The A-10 Thunderbolt II is an American twin-engine, straight-wing jet aircraft developed by Fairchild-Republic in the early 1970s which is the only United States Air Force aircraft designed solely for close air support of ground forces. The A-10 was built to attack armoured fighting vehicles, and other ground targets with limited air defenses, often through strafing.

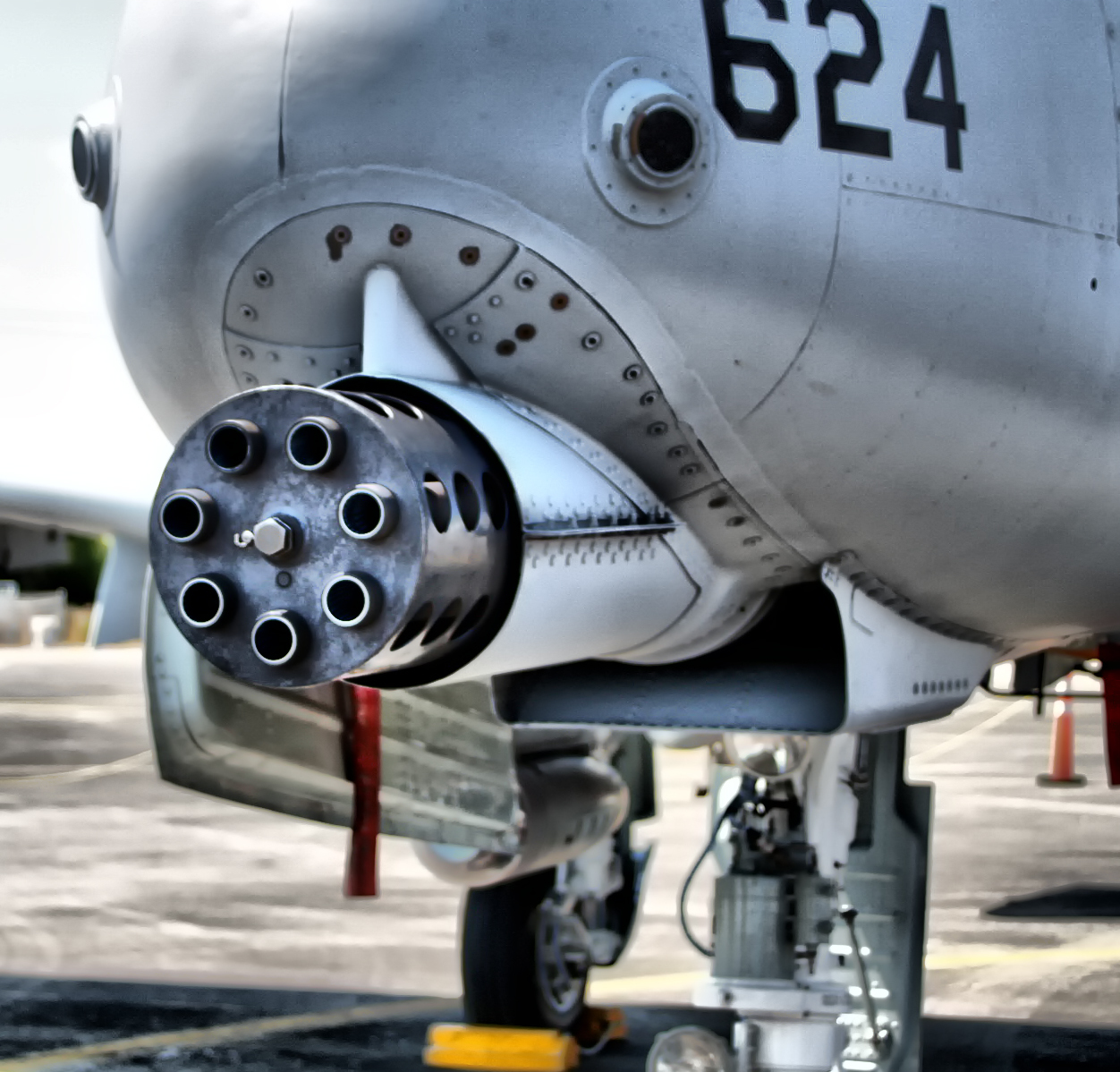
A-10's 30 mm GAU-8 Avenger cannon is used for strafing armored fighting vehicles and other ground targets.

The A-10 was designed around the GAU-8 Avenger, a 30 mm (1.2 in) rotary cannon, which is the airplane's primary armament and the heaviest such automatic cannon mounted on an aircraft. The A-10's airframe was designed for survivability, with measures such as 1,200 pounds (540 kg) of armor for protection of the cockpit and aircraft systems that enables the aircraft to continue flying after taking significant damage. The A-10's official name comes from the Republic P-47 Thunderbolt of World War II, a fighter that was particularly effective at close air support. The A-10 is the main US plane designed to do strafing runs.

Since 2001, Coalition pilots in Iraq and Afghanistan have used strafing runs to support ground forces in areas where explosive ordnance could cause unacceptable civilian casualties. Strafing runs done by F-16s are very risky for the pilot. The cities of Damascus and Aleppo were strafed by helicopter gunships in the Syrian civil war.

In 2004, the United States Air Force accidentally strafed one of its own country's middle schools while training in the strafing of the Little Egg Harbor Intermediate School incident.

== See also ==
- Ground-attack aircraft
- List of established military terms
- Military aviation
