= Battle of Chestnut Neck =

1778 battle in the American Revolutionary War

Coordinates: 39.5446°N 74.4614°W

- Part of the American Revolutionary War
Date	October 6, 1778
Location	Chestnut Neck, near present-day Port Republic, New Jersey
Result	Inconclusive

Belligerents
United States	Great Britain

Commanders and leaders
Casimir Pulaski	Patrick Ferguson; Henry Collins

Strength
50	400

Casualties and losses
Unknown	1 wounded

The Battle of Chestnut Neck was fought on October 6, 1778 in southern New Jersey during the American Revolutionary War, at Chestnut Neck, a settlement on the Little Egg Harbor River (now known as the Mullica River) near the present-day city of Port Republic, New Jersey, which was used as a base by privateers. The British retrieved some supplies and destroyed others, as well as destroying some residences and other buildings.

Learning that Count Casimir Pulaski was on the way, the British quickly left by ship the following day. They had an encounter with Pulaski's forces a week later and caused heavy losses.

== Background ==
At the beginning of the American Revolutionary War, Chestnut Neck was a busy thriving trade center on the Little Egg Harbor River near the New Jersey coast, about 10 miles (16 km) north of present-day Atlantic City, New Jersey. Local vessels traveled to New York and elsewhere, carrying mail, trading goods and merchandise. With the coming of the war, American privateers took over the harbor facilities to use as a home base. They would attack and seize British ships and take their captured prizes into Chestnut Neck. The captured vessels and their cargoes were sold, and the captured vessels were often adapted for use as privateers. In addition, French aid to the Patriots may have come in through Chestnut Neck as well - supplies, ammunition, uniforms, and the like.

With the British holding Philadelphia and New York City during the winter of 1777–78, General George Washington at Valley Forge was cut off from his sources of supplies. Supplies were brought into Little Egg Harbor, unloaded at Chestnut Neck, taken up the river in flat-bottomed boats to the Forks, carted across the peninsula to Burlington, across the Delaware River, and transported overland to Valley Forge. Many British cargoes intended for Sir Henry Clinton in New York were seized by American privateers and reached General Washington via Chestnut Neck and the described route.

General Clinton became so exasperated by this constant loss of his ships, that he decided to "clean out that nest of Rebel Pirates." Accordingly, on September 30, 1778, a fleet of nine British ships and transports, under the command of Captain Henry Collins, with 300 British regulars and 100 New Jersey Loyalists, under Captain Patrick Ferguson, sailed from New York, bound for Chestnut Neck.

Governor William Livingston learned of their sailing, and sent riders to warn the people. General Washington dispatched Count Kazimierz Pułaski and his Legion to assist the Patriots, although they did not arrive until the day following the battle.

== Battle ==
Because of bad weather, the British fleet did not arrive off Little Egg Harbor until late in the afternoon of October 5, 1778, and were prevented from getting over the bar. Knowing the people had been warned and that Count Pułaski was on his way, the British troops made their way up the river to Chestnut Neck as quickly as possible. The troops were put aboard the galleys and armed boats and left at daybreak on October 6, 1778. They were delayed when two boats grounded, and did not reach Chestnut Neck until four o'clock, in heavy fog. They fought against American defenders and retrieved some supplies.

Having destroyed any supplies that they could not retrieve, and having received intelligence that Count Pułaski was on his way, they quickly left at noon on October 7, 1778, stopping at the mouth of the Bass River to destroy the salt works and mills of Eli Mathis. They also burnt the houses on his plantation, his home and barns and then rejoined their ships.

== Aftermath ==
As soon as Pulaski arrived at Chestnut Neck, he crossed the river and marched to Tuckerton, arriving there on October 8, 1778. Pułaski (with 50 troops) and the Loyalists (with 200) watched each other until October 15, 1778. That day a force of 250 Loyalists under Ferguson's command surprised an outpost of Pułaski's men, bayonetting the sentry and almost all of the other men while still sleeping. The Loyalists withdrew and sailed back to New York. Patriot sources called this the "Little Egg Harbor massacre." The site is marked by a monument erected by the Sons of the Cincinnati.

Although they retrieved some supplies and destroyed others at Chestnut Neck, Ferguson's men were not able to capture any of the American privateers or recapture any of the prize vessels present in the area. After the battle, Chestnut Neck never regained its status as a trade center. Three of the large land owners returned and rebuilt their homes, but the others eventually built new homes in present-day Port Republic.

== Legacy ==
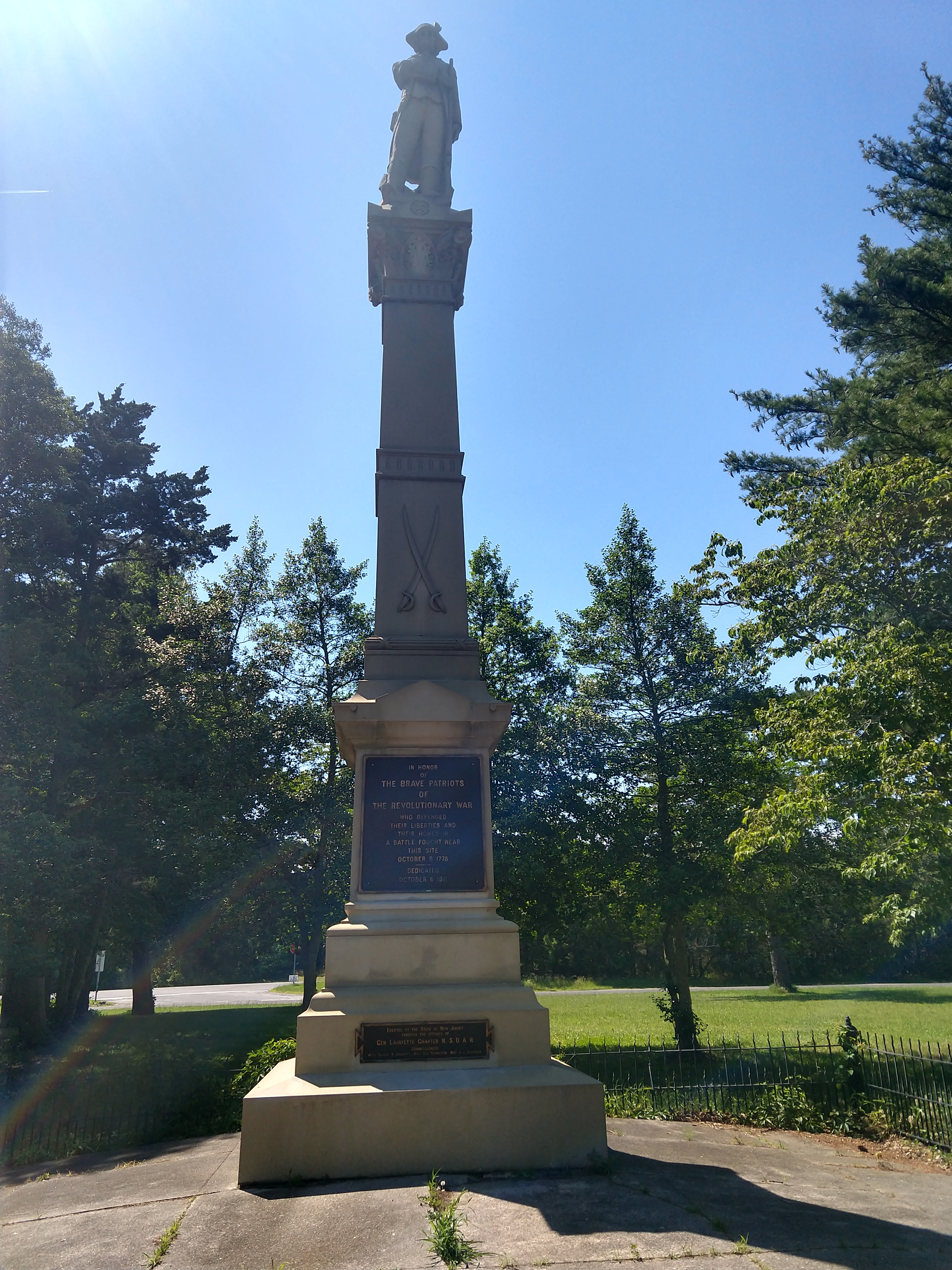
Monument commemorating the battle in Port Republic.

In the early twentieth century, the General Lafayette Chapter of the Daughters of the American Revolution erected a 50-foot (15 m) high monument to mark the site of the Battle of Chestnut Neck and honor the men that fought there. The Minute Man at its top faces the river, "guarding the shore" against the approaching enemy. The monument was dedicated on October 6, 1911.

== See also ==
- American Revolutionary War § Stalemate in the North. Places 'Battle of Chestnut Neck' in overall sequence and strategic context.

== Citations ==
- Nordheimer, Jon (May 6, 1993). "Port Republic Journal: Where the Biggest News Is Something from 1778". New York Times. "The battle monument was erected in 1911 by the Daughters of the American Revolution. The highway was rerouted in the 1920s, however, so the soldier under the tricornered hat at the top has his back to Route 9."
- Stryker, William Scudder (1894). The affair at Egg Harbor, New Jersey, October 15, 1778. Trenton, NJ: Naar, Day & Naar.
