= Port Republic, New Jersey =

City in Atlantic County, New Jersey, US

- City
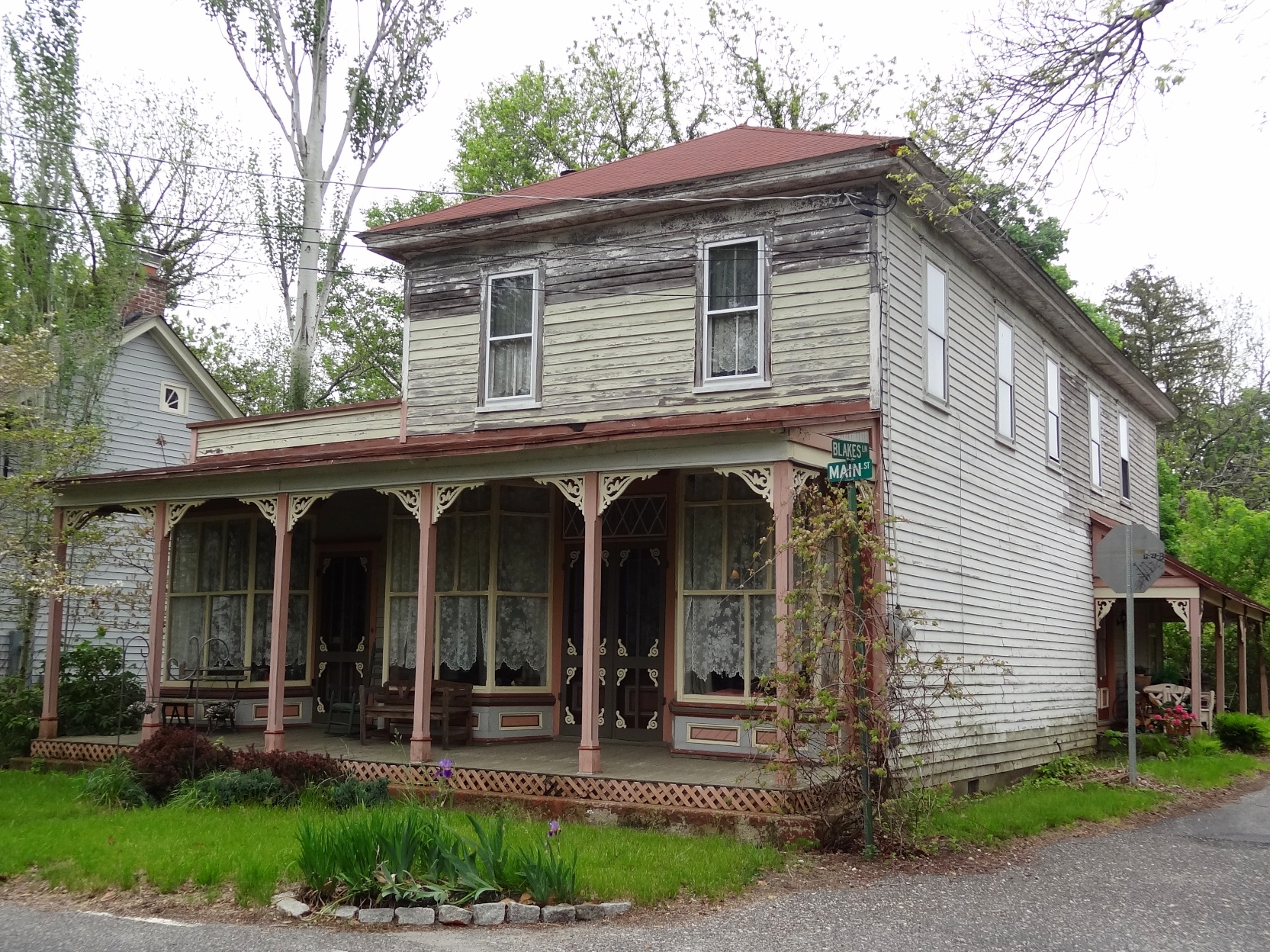
- Amanda Blake Store

- Seal

- Map of Port Republic in Atlantic County. Inset: Location of Atlantic County in the State of New Jersey.

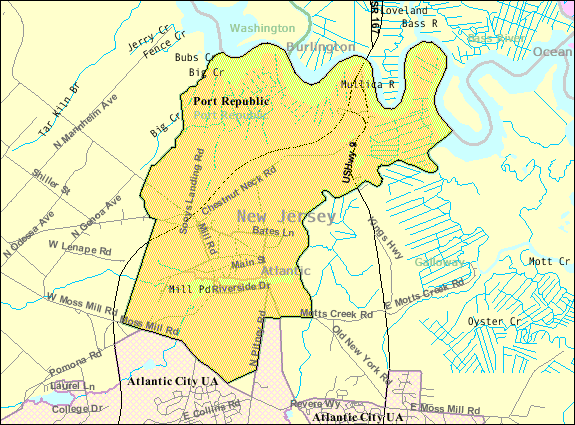
- Census Bureau map of Port Republic, New Jersey

- Location in Atlantic County Location in New Jersey Location in the United States
- Coordinates: 39.534798°N 74.476099°W
- Country: United States
- State: New Jersey
- County: Atlantic
- Incorporated: March 1, 1905

Government
  - Type: City
  - Body: City Council
  - Mayor: Monica "Niki" Giberson (R, term ends December 31, 2025)
  - Municipal clerk: Kimberly A. Campellone

Area
  - Total: 8.55 sq mi (22.14 km^{2})
  - Land: 7.46 sq mi (19.33 km^{2})
  - Water: 1.08 sq mi (2.81 km^{2}) 12.70%
  - Rank: 225th of 565 in state 13th of 23 in county
- Elevation: 7 ft (2.1 m)

Population (2020)
  - Total: 1,101
  - Estimate (2023): 1,109
  - Rank: 526th of 565 in state 21st of 23 in county
  - Density: 147.5/sq mi (57.0/km^{2})
  - Rank: 520th of 565 in state 20th of 23 in county
- Time zone: UTC−05:00 (Eastern (EST))
  - Summer (DST): UTC−04:00 (Eastern (EDT))
- ZIP Code: 08241
- Area code: 609 exchanges: 404, 652, 748
- FIPS code: 3400160600
- GNIS feature ID: 0885360
- Website: www.portrepublicnj.org

Port Republic is a city on the Mullica River, located in Atlantic County, in the U.S. state of New Jersey. As of the 2020 United States census, the city's population was 1,101, a decrease of 14 (−1.3%) from the 2010 census count of 1,115, which in turn reflected an increase of 78 (+7.5%) from the 1,037 counted in the 2000 census.

It is a dry town, where alcohol is not permitted to be sold by law.

Geographically, the city, and all of Atlantic County, is part of the South Jersey region of the state and of the Atlantic City-Hammonton metropolitan statistical area, which in turn is included in the Philadelphia metropolitan area.

== History ==
In 1774, Evi Smith, Hugh McCullum, and Richard Wescoat applied for a Royal charter to build a dam, sawmill, and gristmill on their land along Nacote Creek. While it has been claimed that Chestnut Neck was settled as early as 1637, no evidence to support this claim has been presented.

In its early days, Port Republic was known as Wrangleboro. During the American Revolutionary War, Port Republic provided refuge to the residents of the nearby community of Chestnut Neck when the British Army, arriving by ship, sacked their town on October 6, 1778. It had been used as a base by privateers who were capturing goods intended for British forces. Among the refugees was Daniel Mathis, a tavernkeeper who built the Franklin Inn in Port Republic, which is used as a private house today. Some of the British ships were trapped in the creek by the ebb tides.

The General Lafayette Chapter of the Daughters of the American Revolution erected a monument on October 6, 1911, to mark the site of the Battle of Chestnut Neck. A Continental Army soldier at the top of the 50-foot (15 m) monument faces the river, "guarding the shore" against the approaching enemy.

In 1842, an effort was made to rename the area from Wrangleborough to Unionville, with a post office to be established under that name. As another Unionville existed in the state, the name "Port Republic" was chosen.

Port Republic was incorporated as a city by an act of the New Jersey Legislature on March 1, 1905, from portions of Galloway Township. The city's name derives from the "U.S. Republic".

== Geography ==
According to the United States Census Bureau, Port Republic city had a total area of 8.55 square miles (22.14 km^{2}), including 7.46 square miles (19.33 km^{2}) of land and 1.09 square miles (2.81 km^{2}) of water (12.70%).

Unincorporated communities, localities and place names located partially or completely within the township include Chestnut Neck and Unionville.

The city borders the township of Galloway in Atlantic County, and both Bass River and Washington townships in Burlington County.

The city is one of 56 South Jersey municipalities that are included within the New Jersey Pinelands National Reserve, a protected natural area of unique ecology covering 1,100,000 acres (450,000 ha), that has been classified as a United States Biosphere Reserve and established by Congress in 1978 as the nation's first National Reserve. Part of the city is included in the state-designated Pinelands Area, which includes portions of Atlantic County, along with areas in Burlington, Camden, Cape May, Cumberland, Gloucester and Ocean counties.

== Demographics ==
Historical population
Census	Pop.	Note	%±
1910	405		—
1920	340		−16.0%
1930	373		9.7%
1940	402		7.8%
1950	423		5.2%
1960	561		32.6%
1970	586		4.5%
1980	837		42.8%
1990	992		18.5%
2000	1,037		4.5%
2010	1,115		7.5%
2020	1,101		−1.3%
2023 (est.)	1,109		0.7%
Population sources: 1910–2000; 1910–1920 1910 1910–1930; 1940–2000 2000; 2010 2020

=== 2010 census ===
The 2010 United States census counted 1,115 people, 415 households, and 320 families in the city. The population density was 149.0 per square mile (57.5/km^{2}). There were 444 housing units at an average density of 59.3 per square mile (22.9/km^{2}). The racial makeup was 95.78% (1,068) White, 0.63% (7) Black or African American, 0.45% (5) Native American, 0.90% (10) Asian, 0.00% (0) Pacific Islander, 0.72% (8) from other races, and 1.52% (17) from two or more races. Hispanic or Latino of any race were 2.96% (33) of the population.

Of the 415 households, 28.9% had children under the age of 18; 65.8% were married couples living together; 8.7% had a female householder with no husband present and 22.9% were non-families. Of all households, 18.3% were made up of individuals and 4.8% had someone living alone who was 65 years of age or older. The average household size was 2.67 and the average family size was 3.03.

22.2% of the population were under the age of 18, 5.7% from 18 to 24, 20.3% from 25 to 44, 39.1% from 45 to 64, and 12.6% who were 65 years of age or older. The median age was 46.1 years. For every 100 females, the population had 92.6 males. For every 100 females ages 18 and older there were 89.7 males.

The Census Bureau's 2006–2010 American Community Survey showed that (in 2010 inflation-adjusted dollars) median household income was $77,063 (with a margin of error of +/− $5,800) and the median family income was $89,375 (+/− $15,052). Males had a median income of $61,786 (+/− $11,982) versus $38,000 (+/− $4,481) for females. The per capita income for the borough was $36,408 (+/− $4,232). About 2.4% of families and 2.9% of the population were below the poverty line, including 3.2% of those under age 18 and none of those age 65 or over.

=== 2000 census ===
As of the 2000 United States census there were 1,037 people, 365 households, and 289 families residing in the city. The population density was 136.0 inhabitants per square mile (52.5/km^{2}). There were 389 housing units at an average density of 51.0 per square mile (19.7/km^{2}). The racial makeup of the city was 95.08% White, 1.64% African American, 0.39% Native American, 0.58% Asian, 0.00% Pacific Islander, 0.68% from other races, and 1.64% from two or more races. 1.06% of the population were Hispanic or Latino of any race.

There were 365 households, out of which 36.7% had children under the age of 18 living with them, 64.9% were married couples living together, 10.1% had a female householder with no husband present, and 20.8% were non-families. 16.7% of all households were made up of individuals, and 7.9% had someone living alone who was 65 years of age or older. The average household size was 2.82 and the average family size was 3.17.

In the city the age distribution of the population shows 24.0% under the age of 18, 8.0% from 18 to 24, 26.1% from 25 to 44, 29.9% from 45 to 64, and 12.0% who were 65 years of age or older. The median age was 41 years. For every 100 females, there were 96.8 males. For every 100 females age 18 and over, there were 93.1 males.

The median income for a household in the city was $65,833, and the median income for a family was $70,714. Males had a median income of $42,833 versus $34,375 for females. The per capita income for the city was $24,369. 3.5% of the population and 3.2% of families were below the poverty line. Out of the total population, none of those under the age of 18 and 13.2% of those 65 and older were living below the poverty line.

== Government ==
Port Republic operates under the City form of New Jersey municipal government, which is used in 15 municipalities (of the 564) statewide. Under this form of government, the council functions as a legislative body: it passes ordinances and approves the appointments of the mayor. The mayor, as executive, is responsible for administrative functions and appointment of all officials. The governing body is comprised of a mayor and a city council who are chosen in partisan elections held as part of the November general election. The mayor serves a four-year term of office. The City Council is comprised of seven members, with one member elected at-large to a four-year term in office and six who are elected from wards to three-year terms on a staggered basis with two seats up for election each year.

As of 2023, the Mayor of the City of Port Republic is Republican Monica "Niki" Giberson, whose term of office ends December 31, 2025. Members of the City Council are Council President Roger Giberson (R, 2024; At Large), Steve Allgeyer (R, 2024; Ward I), Doris A. Bugdon (R, 2024; Ward II), Eugene F. Hawn (R, 2025; Ward I), Jacob Nass (R, 2023; Ward II), Donna Lee Riegel (R, 2025; Ward II) and Michael J. Turner (R, 2023; Ward I - elected to serve an unexpired term).

In June 2018, the City Council selected Tom Kurtz to fill the Ward I seat expiring in December 2020 that had become vacant following the resignation of Nicholas Capille the previous month. In the November 2018 general election, Kurtz was elected to serve the balance of the term of office.

In March 2017, the City Council swore in Stanley Kozlowski to fill the vacant Ward II seat expiring in December 2019 that was won by John Bonthron in the November 2016 general election. Kozlowski served on an interim basis until the November 2017 general election when he was chosen to serve the remainder of the term of office.

After Council President Craig J. Rummler's resignation letter was accepted in May 2016, Steven Allgeyer was selected from three candidates nominated by the Republican municipal committee and sworn in to fill the vacant Ward I seat. In the November 2016, general election, Allgeyer won the remaining two years of the seat.

=== Federal, state and county representation ===
Port Republic is located in the 2nd Congressional District and is part of New Jersey's 2nd state legislative district.

For the 119th United States Congress, New Jersey's 2nd congressional district is represented by Jeff Van Drew (R, Dennis Township). New Jersey is represented in the United States Senate by Democrats Cory Booker (Newark, term ends 2027) and Andy Kim (Moorestown, term ends 2031).

For the 2026–2027 session, the 2nd legislative district of the New Jersey Legislature is represented in the New Jersey Senate by Vincent J. Polistina (R, Egg Harbor Township) and in the General Assembly by Don Guardian (R, Atlantic City) and Maureen Rowan (D, Atlantic City).

Atlantic County is governed by a directly elected county executive and a nine-member Board of County Commissioners, responsible for legislation. The executive serves a four-year term and the commissioners are elected to staggered three-year terms, of which four are elected from the county on an at-large basis and five of the commissioners represent equally populated districts. As of 2025, Atlantic County's Executive is Dennis Levinson (R, Northfield), whose term of office ends December 31, 2027. Members of the Board of County Commissioners are:

Ernest D. Coursey (D, District 1-- Atlantic City, Egg Harbor Township (part), Longport, Margate City, and Ventnor City; 2025, Atlantic City), Chair Maureen Kern (R, District 2-- Egg Harbor Township (part), Linwood, Northfield, Somers Point and Pleasantville; 2027, Somers Point), Andrew Parker III (R, District 3-- Egg Harbor Township (part) and Hamilton Township (part); 2026, Egg Harbor Township), Richard R. Dase (R, District 4, including Brigantine, Galloway Township, Egg Harbor Township (part), and Port Republic; 2025, Galloway Township), Vice Chair James A. Bertino (R, District 5-- Buena, Buena Vista Township, Corbin City, Egg Harbor City, Estell Manor, Folsom, Hamilton Township (part), Hammonton, Mullica Township and Weymouth Township; 2027, Hammonton), June Byrnes (R, At-Large; 2026, Linwood), Michael Ruffu (R, At-Large; Margate, 2027) Amy L. Gatto (R, At-large; 2025, Hamilton Township) and John W. Risley (R, At-Large; 2026, Egg Harbor Township)

Atlantic County's constitutional officers are: Clerk Joesph J. Giralo (R, 2026, Hammonton), Sheriff Joe O'Donoghue (R, 2026, Egg Harbor Township) and Surrogate James Curcio (R, 2025, Hammonton).

=== Politics ===
As of March 2011, there were a total of 855 registered voters in Port Republic, of which 164 (19.2% vs. 30.5% countywide) were registered as Democrats, 401 (46.9% vs. 25.2%) were registered as Republicans and 289 (33.8% vs. 44.3%) were registered as Unaffiliated. There was one voter registered to another party. Among the city's 2010 Census population, 76.7% (vs. 58.8% in Atlantic County) were registered to vote, including 98.6% of those ages 18 and over (vs. 76.6% countywide).

Gubernatorial election results for Port Republic
Year	Republican		Democratic		Third party(ies)	
Year	No.	%	No.	%	No.	%
2025	397	61.46%	244	37.77%	5	0.77%
2021	367	63.72%	208	36.11%	1	0.17%
2017	241	57.11%	173	41.00%	8	1.90%
2013	317	69.82%	126	27.75%	11	2.42%
2009	294	60.74%	161	33.26%	29	5.99%
2005	240	56.07%	170	39.72%	18	4.21%

In the 2012 presidential election, Republican Mitt Romney received 390 votes (57.5% vs. 41.1% countywide), ahead of Democrat Barack Obama with 274 votes (40.4% vs. 57.9%) and other candidates with 10 votes (1.5% vs. 0.9%), among the 678 ballots cast by the city's 896 registered voters, for a turnout of 75.7% (vs. 65.8% in Atlantic County). In the 2008 presidential election, Republican John McCain received 403 votes (58.5% vs. 41.6% countywide), ahead of Democrat Barack Obama with 270 votes (39.2% vs. 56.5%) and other candidates with 12 votes (1.7% vs. 1.1%), among the 689 ballots cast by the city's 872 registered voters, for a turnout of 79.0% (vs. 68.1% in Atlantic County). In the 2004 presidential election, Republican George W. Bush received 390 votes (61.7% vs. 46.2% countywide), ahead of Democrat John Kerry with 228 votes (36.1% vs. 52.0%) and other candidates with 6 votes (0.9% vs. 0.8%), among the 632 ballots cast by the city's 782 registered voters, for a turnout of 80.8% (vs. 69.8% in the whole county).

Presidential elections results
Year	Republican	Democratic	Third Parties
2024	64.2% 479	35.1% 262	0.7% 5
2020	60.5% 465	37.2% 286	2.3% 18
2016	59.5% 381	35.2% 225	5.3% 34
2012	57.5% 390	40.4% 274	1.5% 10
2008	58.5% 403	39.2% 270	1.7% 12
2004	61.7% 390	36.1% 228	0.9% 6

In the 2013 gubernatorial election, Republican Chris Christie received 317 votes (68.6% vs. 60.0% countywide), ahead of Democrat Barbara Buono with 126 votes (27.3% vs. 34.9%) and other candidates with 11 votes (2.4% vs. 1.3%), among the 462 ballots cast by the city's 899 registered voters, yielding a 51.4% turnout (vs. 41.5% in the county). In the 2009 gubernatorial election, Republican Chris Christie received 294 votes (60.5% vs. 47.7% countywide), ahead of Democrat Jon Corzine with 161 votes (33.1% vs. 44.5%), Independent Chris Daggett with 26 votes (5.3% vs. 4.8%) and other candidates with 3 votes (0.6% vs. 1.2%), among the 486 ballots cast by the city's 845 registered voters, yielding a 57.5% turnout (vs. 44.9% in the county).

United States Senate election results for Port Republic1
Year	Republican		Democratic		Third party(ies)	
Year	No.	%	No.	%	No.	%
2024	464	64.27%	246	34.07%	12	1.66%
2018	359	66.36%	172	31.79%	10	1.85%
2012	382	58.86%	252	38.83%	15	2.31%
2006	268	59.82%	175	39.06%	5	1.12%

United States Senate election results for Port Republic2
Year	Republican		Democratic		Third party(ies)	
Year	No.	%	No.	%	No.	%
2020	467	62.02%	280	37.18%	6	0.80%
2014	253	59.95%	158	37.44%	11	2.61%
2013	200	66.45%	100	33.22%	1	0.33%
2008	385	60.44%	250	39.25%	2	0.31%

== Education ==
Students in public school from kindergarten through eighth grade are educated by the Port Republic School District at Port Republic Elementary School. As of the 2023–24 school year, the district, comprised of one school, had an enrollment of 115 students and 11.4 classroom teachers (on an FTE basis), for a student–teacher ratio of 10.1:1. During the 2016–17 school year, Port Republic was the 12th-smallest enrollment of any school district in the state, with 118 students.

Students in ninth through twelfth grades attend Cedar Creek High School, which is located in the northern section of Egg Harbor City and opened to students in September 2010. The school is one of three high schools operated as part of the Greater Egg Harbor Regional High School District, which also includes the constituent municipalities of Egg Harbor City, Galloway Township, Hamilton Township, and Mullica Township, and participates in sending/receiving relationships with Port Republic and Washington Township (Burlington County). Cedar Creek High School is zoned to serve students from Egg Harbor City, Mullica Township, Port Republic, and Washington Township. Students in portions of Galloway and Hamilton townships have the opportunity to attend Cedar Creek through the school of choice program or through attendance in magnet programs offered at Cedar Creek. As of the 2023–24 school year, the high school had an enrollment of 942 students and 78.5 classroom teachers (on an FTE basis), for a student–teacher ratio of 12.0:1.

City public school students are also eligible to attend the Atlantic County Institute of Technology in the Mays Landing section of Hamilton Township or the Charter-Tech High School for the Performing Arts, located in Somers Point.

== Transportation ==
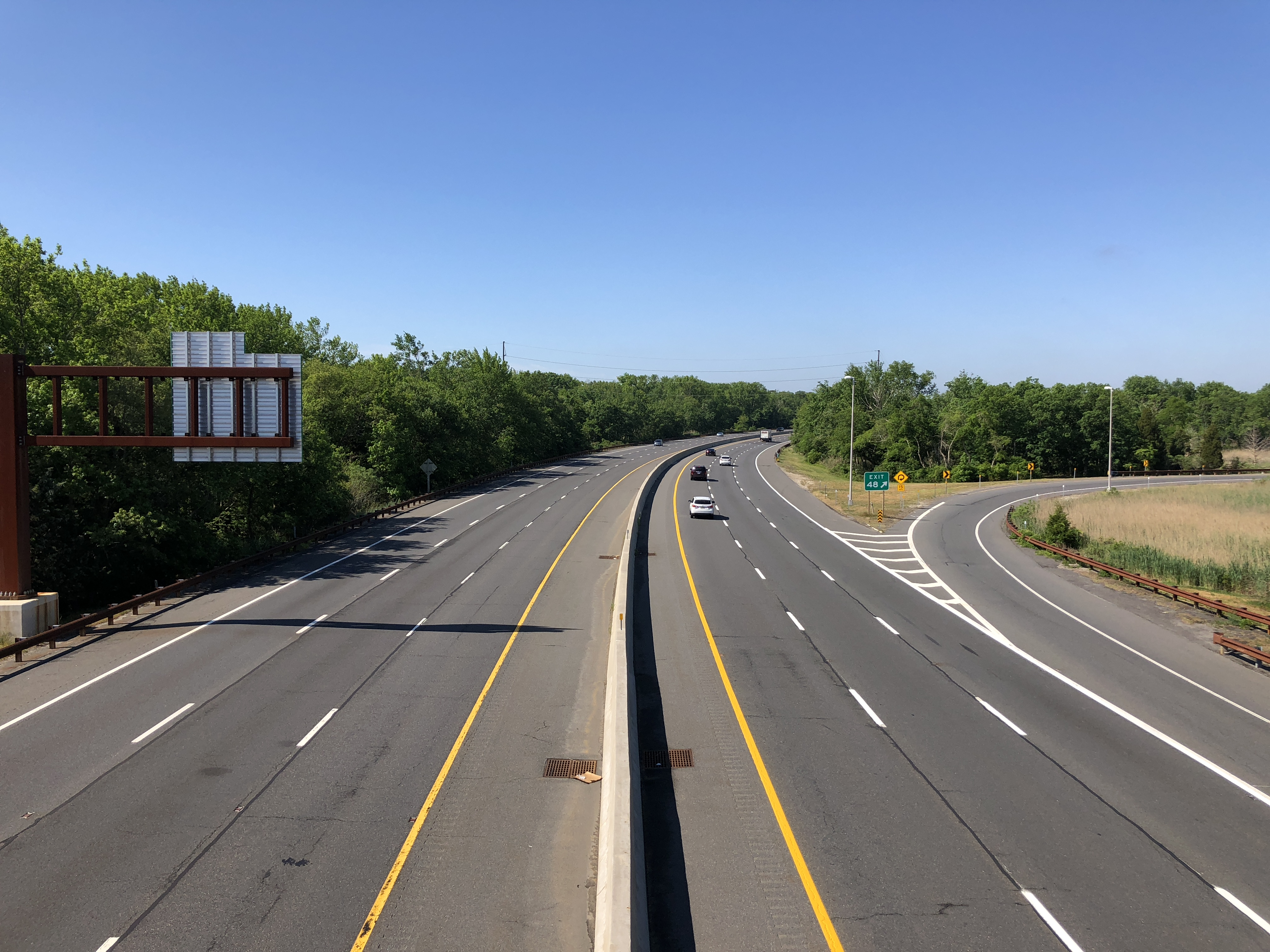
The southbound Garden State Parkway past the exit for U.S. Route 9 in Port Republic

=== Roads and highways ===
As of May 2010, the city had a total of 23.29 miles (37.48 km) of roadways, of which 8.18 miles (13.16 km) were maintained by the municipality, 9.65 miles (15.53 km) by Atlantic County and 1.81 miles (2.91 km) by the New Jersey Department of Transportation and 3.65 miles (5.87 km) by the New Jersey Turnpike Authority.

The Garden State Parkway passes through the city and is accessible at Interchange 48. U.S. Route 9 passes through Port Republic, as do County Route 575 and County Route 561 Alternate. A small piece of Route 167 is in the city.

The bridge across Nacote Creek in Port Republic is the oldest bridge in Atlantic County, built in 1904, and is on the New Jersey Register of Historic Places. It was in need of repair, and its reconstruction was planned as part of the county's plan to repair several older bridges throughout the county. The bridge had previously been closed for some time following an inspection that found that its condition had deteriorated. In early 2021, the county commissioners awarded a contract for its replacement, with work scheduled to begin around July 1 of that year. The $12.5 million project repiring the crossing and access roads was completed and the bridge was reopened in September 2023.

=== Public transportation ===
NJ Transit provides bus services on the 559 route between Lakewood Township and Atlantic City.

== Historic sites ==
Locations in Port Republic listed on the National Register of Historic Places include the Amanda Blake Store located at 104 Main Street (added January 25, 1979, as building #79001469), and the Port Republic Historic District (added May 16, 1991 as district #91000596), which is roughly bounded by Mill Street, Clark's Landing Road, Adams Avenue, Port Republic-Smithville Road and Riverside Drive.

== Notable people ==
People who were born in, residents of, or otherwise closely associated with Port Republic include:

- Stephen Dunn (1939–2021), poet and winner of the Pulitzer Prize for Poetry
