= Little Egg Harbor Township School District =

School District in Ocean County, New Jersey, US

Address
- 307 Frog Pond Road Little Egg Harbor Township, Ocean County, New Jersey, 08087; United States
- Coordinates: 39.628458°N 74.328832°W

District information
- Grades: PreK-6
- Superintendent: Michelle Cappelluti (interim)
- Business administrator: Carl Morelli
- Schools: 3

Students and staff
- Enrollment: 1,680 (as of 2024–25)
- Faculty: 136.2 FTEs
- Student–teacher ratio: 12.3:1

Other information
- District Factor Group: B
- Website: www.lehsd.org
Ind.	Per pupil	District spending	Rank (*)	K-6 average	%± vs. average
1A	Total Spending	$18,690	35	$18,891	−1.1%
1	Budgetary Cost	13,407	18	13,649	−1.8%
2	Classroom Instruction	8,464	23	8,366	1.2%
6	Support Services	2,508	38	2,161	16.1%
8	Administrative Cost	1,402	22	1,467	−4.4%
10	Operations & Maintenance	1,014	2	1,552	−34.7%
13	Extracurricular Activities	5	4	39	−87.2%
16	Median Teacher Salary	61,972	43	57,437
Data from NJDoE 2014 Taxpayers' Guide to Education Spending. *Of K-6 districts with any number of students. Lowest spending=1; Highest=59

The Little Egg Harbor Township School District is a comprehensive community public school district that serves students in pre-kindergarten through sixth grade from Little Egg Harbor Township, in Ocean County, in the U.S. state of New Jersey. The district also serves Bass River Township, a non-operating district whose students attend as part of a sending/receiving relationship that started in the 2020–21 school year.

As of the 2024–25 school year, the district, comprised of three schools, had an enrollment of 1,680 students and 136.2 classroom teachers (on an FTE basis), for a student–teacher ratio of 12.3:1.

Public school students in seventh through twelfth grades attend the schools of the Pinelands Regional School District, which also serves students from Bass River Township, Eagleswood Township and Tuckerton Borough. Schools in the district (with 2024–25 enrollment data from the National Center for Education Statistics) are Pinelands Regional Junior High School with 500 students in grades 7–8 and Pinelands Regional High School with 1,063 students in grades 9–12. The high school district's board of education is comprised of nine members directly elected by the residents of the constituent municipalities to three-year terms on a staggered basis, with three seats up for election each year. Little Egg Harbor Township is allocated six of the nine seats.

== History ==
The district is composed of two elementary schools. The George J. Mitchell School opened in 1953 as the "Little Egg Harbor Elementary School", housing grades K-6. In 1989, a new school, the Frog Pond Elementary School opened as the "Little Egg Harbor Intermediate School", housing grades 3–6, while the Mitchell School housed grades K-2 from then on. Starting with the 2009–10 school year, both schools were renovated and converted into K-6 schools, with the Intermediate School being renamed to its current name.

Based on the results of a study performed by the Southern Regional Institute and Educational Technology Training Center of Stockton University, and in the wake of declining enrollment and rising costs, the Bass River Township School District decided to have all of its PreK-6 students attend the Little Egg Harbor district as part of a sending/receiving relationship, starting in the 2020-21 school year.

The district had been classified by the New Jersey Department of Education as being in District Factor Group "B", the second-lowest of eight groupings. District Factor Groups organize districts statewide to allow comparison by common socioeconomic characteristics of the local districts. From lowest socioeconomic status to highest, the categories are A, B, CD, DE, FG, GH, I and J.

=== Strafing incident ===
On November 4, 2004, at around 9pm, an F-16 Fighting Falcon jet from the 113th Wing of the District of Columbia Air National Guard, based at Andrews Air Force Base in Maryland on a training mission at the Fort Dix United States Army installation in Warren Grove was climbing upward at 8,000 feet (2,400 m). The test was going pretty well, until a heavy gun from the left wing fired 25 rounds of 20mm ammunition up in the air, which fell to the ground, with eight striking the roof of the school, and the rest hitting the parking lot and the side of the building. No one was injured in the incident.

On November 1, 2006, the district and the United States Air Force announced that a settlement had been reached, whereby the district would be paid $519,070.70 to cover damage to the roof of the school caused in the incident. This is less than the $900,000 that the superintendent had indicated would be needed to cover the costs of replacing the roof damaged in the incident and in the process of evaluating the roof's condition after the incident.

== Schools ==
Schools in the district (with 2024–25 enrollment data from the National Center for Education Statistics.) are:

- Robert C. Wood Sr. Early Childhood Center with 318 students in pre-kindergarten
  - Anne Flynn, principal
- George J. Mitchell Elementary School with 582 students in kindergarten through third grade
  - Christine M. Cummings, principal (until August 2026)
  - TBA, principal (after August 2026)
- Frog Pond Elementary School with 780 students in grades 4 to 6
  - Thomas P. Denning, principal

== Administration ==
Core members of the district's administration are:

- Michelle Cappelluti, interim superintendent
- Carl Morelli, business administrator and board secretary

The district's last permanent Superintendent, Lisa Antunes, resigned in July 2026 after 2 years with the district.

== Board of education ==
The district's board of education, composed of seven members, sets policy and oversees the fiscal and educational operation of the district through its administration. As a Type II school district, the board's trustees are elected directly by voters to serve three-year terms of office on a staggered basis, with either two or three seats up for election each year held (since 2012) as part of the November general election. The board appoints a superintendent to oversee the district's day-to-day operations and a business administrator to supervise the business functions of the district.
