= Bass River Township, New Jersey =

Township in Burlington County, New Jersey, US

- Township
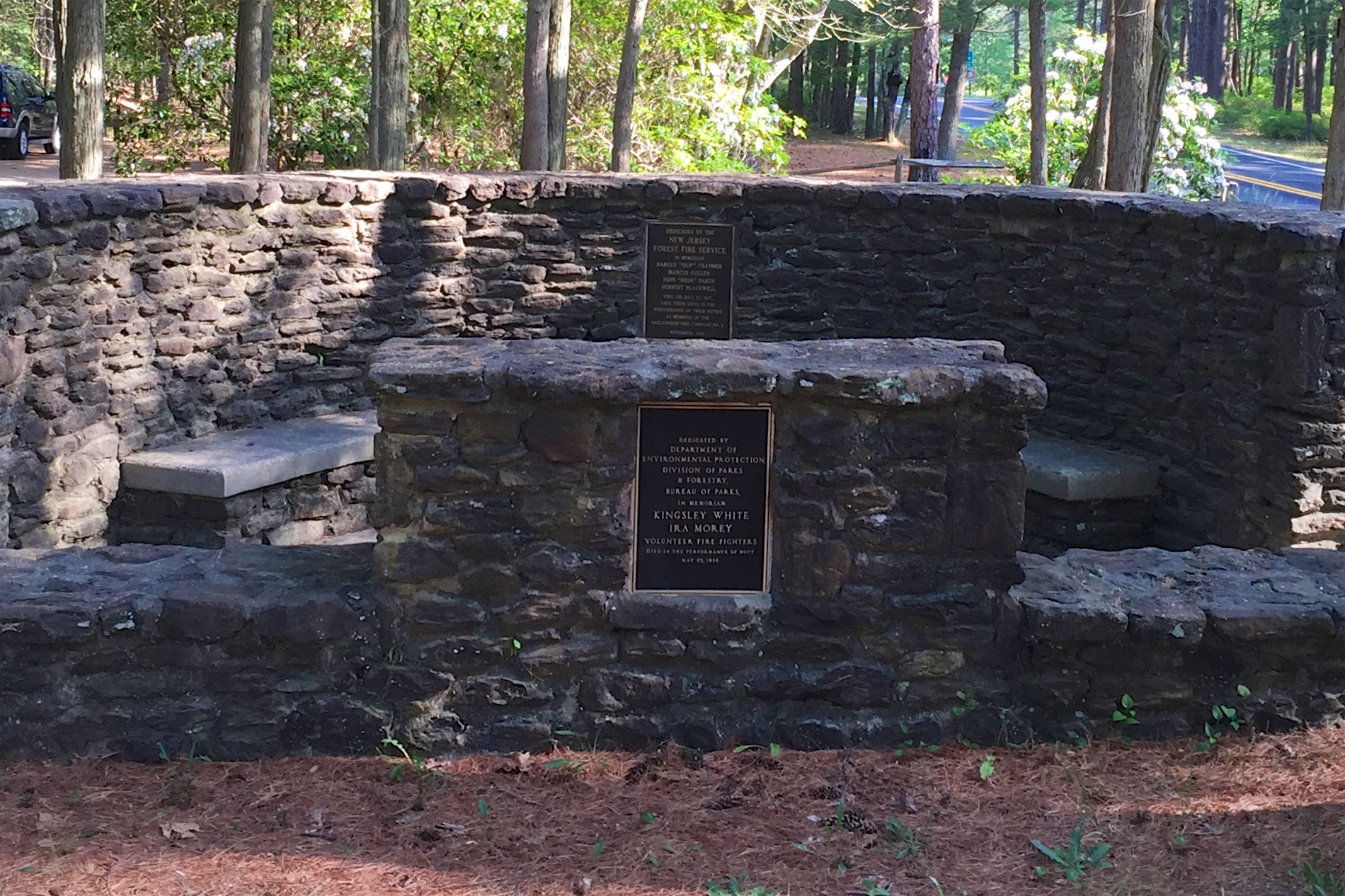
- Bass River State Forest Firefighters Memorial

- Seal
- Motto: "A Clean Community"
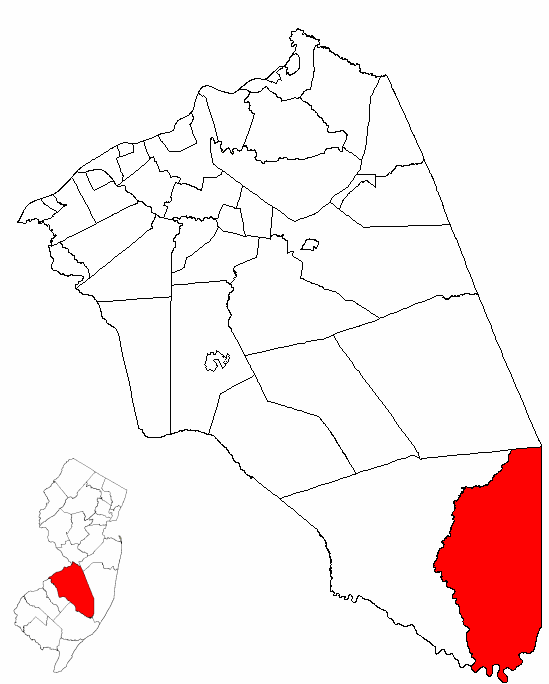
- Location of Bass River Township in Burlington County highlighted in red (right). Inset map: Location of Burlington County in New Jersey highlighted in red (left).

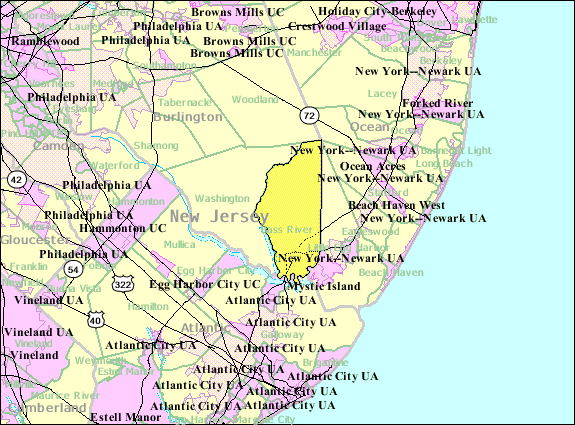
- Census Bureau map of Bass River Township, New Jersey

- Location in Burlington County Location in New Jersey Location in the United States
- Coordinates: 39.658362°N 74.448106°W
- Country: United States
- State: New Jersey
- County: Burlington
- Incorporated: March 30, 1864
- Named after: Jeremiah Basse

Government
  - Type: Walsh Act
  - Body: Board of Commissioners
  - Mayor: William R. Adams (term ends May 31, 2028)
  - Municipal clerk: Jenny Gleghorn

Area
  - Total: 78.41 sq mi (203.09 km^{2})
  - Land: 75.12 sq mi (194.57 km^{2})
  - Water: 3.29 sq mi (8.52 km^{2}) 4.19%
  - Rank: 11th of 565 in state 3rd of 40 in county
- Elevation: 43 ft (13 m)

Population (2020)
  - Total: 1,355
  - Estimate (2023): 1,369
  - Rank: 520th of 565 in state 37th of 40 in county
  - Density: 18/sq mi (6.9/km^{2})
  - Rank: 562nd of 565 in state 38th of 40 in county
- Time zone: UTC−05:00 (Eastern (EST))
  - Summer (DST): UTC−04:00 (Eastern (EDT))
- ZIP Code: 08224 – New Gretna
- Area code: 609
- FIPS code: 3400503370
- GNIS feature ID: 0882086
- Website: bassriver-nj.org

Bass River Township is a township at the southeastern tip of Burlington County, in the U.S. state of New Jersey. The township bears a shoreline fronting both the Bass River and the Great Bay. As of the 2020 United States census, the township's population was 1,355, a decrease of 88 (−6.1%) from the 2010 census count of 1,443, which in turn had reflected a decline of 67 (−4.4%) from the 1,510 counted in the 2000 census. The township and all of Burlington County is a part of the Philadelphia metropolitan area. Bass River is traversed by the Garden State Parkway.

Bass River was incorporated as a township by an act of the New Jersey Legislature on March 30, 1864, from portions of Little Egg Harbor Township and Washington Township.

The township's name originated from the Bass River, a 4.7-mile-long (7.6 km) tributary of the Mullica River, that was in turn named for Jeremiah Basse, who served as governor of both West Jersey and East Jersey.

== Geography ==
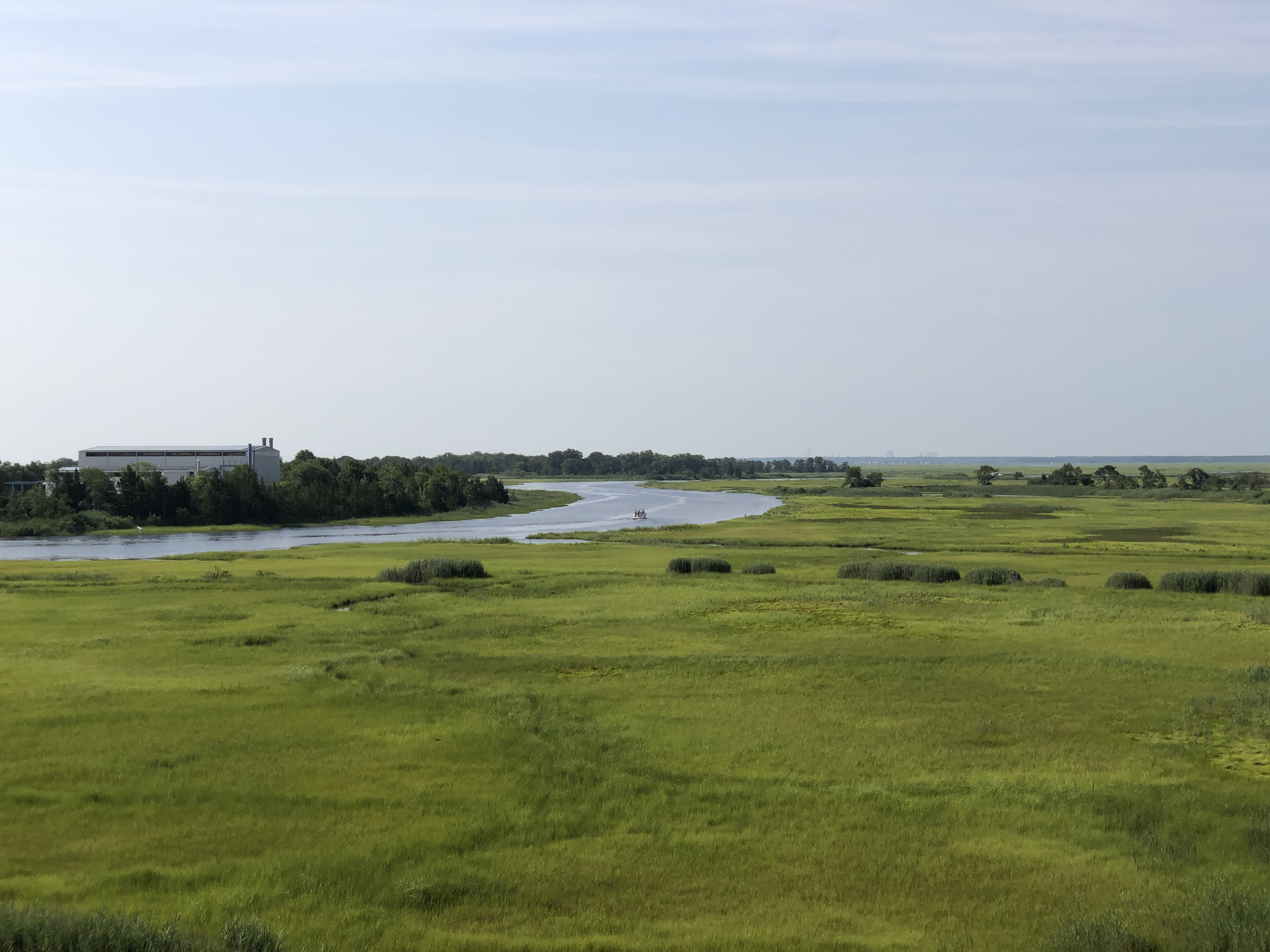
Marshes along the lower Bass River, viewed from the Garden State Parkway

According to the United States Census Bureau, the township had a total area of 78.41 square miles (203.09 km^{2}), including 75.12 square miles (194.57 km^{2}) of land and 3.29 square miles (8.52 km^{2}) of water (4.19%).

Unincorporated communities, localities and place names located partially or completely within the township include Allens Bridge, Bass River State Forest, Calico, Charcoal Landing, Doctors Point, Frogtown, Harrisville, High Bridge, Leektown, Martha, Merrygold, Munion Field, New Gretna, Oak Island, Oswego Lake, Sim Place, State Forest and Wading River.

The township borders Washington Township and Woodland Township in Burlington County; Galloway Township and Port Republic in Atlantic County; and both Barnegat Township and Little Egg Harbor Township in Ocean County.

The township is one of 56 South Jersey municipalities that are included within the Pinelands National Reserve, a protected natural area of unique ecology covering 1,100,000 acres (450,000 ha), that has been classified as a United States Biosphere Reserve and established by Congress in 1978 as the nation's first National Reserve. All of the township is included in either the state-designated Pinelands area or the Pinelands National Reserve, which includes portions of Burlington County, along with areas in Atlantic, Camden, Cape May, Cumberland, Gloucester and Ocean counties.

== Demographics ==
Historical population
| Census | Pop. | Note | %± |
|---|---|---|---|
| 1870 | 807 | | — |
| 1880 | 1,006 | | 24.7% |
| 1890 | 853 | | −15.2% |
| 1900 | 800 | | −6.2% |
| 1910 | 685 | | −14.4% |
| 1920 | 612 | | −10.7% |
| 1930 | 700 | | 14.4% |
| 1940 | 599 | | −14.4% |
| 1950 | 688 | | 14.9% |
| 1960 | 737 | | 7.1% |
| 1970 | 815 | | 10.6% |
| 1980 | 1,344 | | 64.9% |
| 1990 | 1,580 | | 17.6% |
| 2000 | 1,510 | | −4.4% |
| 2010 | 1,443 | | −4.4% |
| 2020 | 1,355 | | −6.1% |
| 2023 (est.) | 1,369 | | 1.0% |
Population sources: 1870–2000; 1870–1920 1870 1880–1890; 1890–1910 1910–1930; 1940–2000 2000; 2010 2020

=== 2010 census ===
The 2010 United States census counted 1,443 people, 522 households, and 407 families in the township. The population density was 19.2 per square mile (7.4/km^{2}). There were 587 housing units at an average density of 7.8 per square mile (3.0/km^{2}). The racial makeup was 97.37% (1,405) White, 0.28% (4) Black or African American, 0.14% (2) Native American, 0.76% (11) Asian, 0.00% (0) Pacific Islander, 0.35% (5) from other races, and 1.11% (16) from two or more races. Hispanic or Latino of any race were 3.12% (45) of the population.

Of the 522 households, 28.4% had children under the age of 18; 60.7% were married couples living together; 9.0% had a female householder with no husband present and 22.0% were non-families. Of all households, 15.5% were made up of individuals and 5.4% had someone living alone who was 65 years of age or older. The average household size was 2.76 and the average family size was 3.09.

20.2% of the population were under the age of 18, 10.0% from 18 to 24, 23.3% from 25 to 44, 33.5% from 45 to 64, and 13.0% who were 65 years of age or older. The median age was 43.0 years. For every 100 females, the population had 104.4 males. For every 100 females ages 18 and older there were 101.0 males.

The Census Bureau's 2006–2010 American Community Survey showed that (in 2010 inflation-adjusted dollars) median household income was $64,185 (with a margin of error of +/− $5,782) and the median family income was $66,364 (+/− $8,461). Males had a median income of $50,625 (+/− $7,486) versus $48,950 (+/− $3,139) for females. The per capita income for the borough was $24,440 (+/− $2,573). About 9.4% of families and 12.3% of the population were below the poverty line, including 18.5% of those under age 18 and 27.8% of those age 65 or over.

=== 2000 census ===
As of the 2000 United States census, there were 1,510 people, 548 households, and 409 families residing in the township. The population density was 19.9 inhabitants per square mile (7.7/km^{2}). There were 602 housing units at an average density of 7.9 per square mile (3.1/km^{2}). The racial makeup of the township was 98.87% White, 0.07% African American, 0.07% Native American, 0.13% Asian, 0.13% from other races, and 0.73% from two or more races. Hispanic or Latino of any race were 2.19% of the population.

There were 548 households, out of which 35.8% had children under the age of 18 living with them, 59.1% were married couples living together, 9.1% had a female householder with no husband present, and 25.2% were non-families. 19.3% of all households were made up of individuals, and 7.1% had someone living alone who was 65 years of age or older. The average household size was 2.76 and the average family size was 3.15.

In the township the population was spread out, with 26.8% under the age of 18, 8.5% from 18 to 24, 30.3% from 25 to 44, 23.7% from 45 to 64, and 10.7% who were 65 years of age or older. The median age was 38 years. For every 100 females, there were 103.5 males. For every 100 females age 18 and over, there were 104.6 males.

The median income for a household in the township was $47,469, and the median income for a family was $51,167. Males had a median income of $35,179 versus $27,222 for females. The per capita income for the township was $20,382. About 2.4% of families and 5.2% of the population were below the poverty line, including 4.5% of those under age 18 and 7.0% of those age 65 or over.

== Government ==
=== Local government ===
Since 1972, Bass River Township has been governed under the Walsh Act by a three-member commission. The township is one of 30 municipalities (of the 564) statewide that use the commission form of government. The governing body is comprised of three commissioners, who are elected at-large in non-partisan elections held every four years as part of the May municipal election to serve four-year terms of office on a concurrent basis. Each of the Commissioners is appointed to serve as the head of a designated department. The commissioners choose a mayor, who presides over meetings but has no executive role.

As of 2026 and continuing through May 15, 2028, members of the Bass River Township Board of Commissioners are Mayor William R. Adams (Commissioner of Revenue and Finance), Deputy Mayor Louis Bourguignon (Commissioner of Public Works, Parks and Public Property) and Jane Allen (Commissioner of Public Affairs and Public Safety; appointed to serve an unexpired term).

In June 2024, Jane Allen was appointed to fill the seat vacated by Nicholas Capriglione when he resigned at the reorganization meeting held the previous month; Allen will serve on an interim basis until the November 2025 general election, when voters will choose a candidate to serve the remainder of the term of office.

Bass River Township's municipal court, which it shares with neighboring Washington Township, is located in New Gretna.

==== Emergency services ====
Like other municipalities in New Jersey without a local police department, Bass River Township is served by troopers from the New Jersey State Police Troop C which maintains a barrack in Tuckerton. The New Jersey State Park Police, which operates a station in Washington Township, is responsible for any matters occurring within state forests.

The New Gretna Volunteer Fire Company provides fire protection for all of Bass River Township. Additionally the Fire Company provides rescue services and operates an EMS First Response vehicle for medical emergencies.

Bass River Township is served by Galloway Township EMS, which also provides primary 911 emergency medical services for the residents of Galloway Township, New Jersey, Port Republic, New Jersey and Egg Harbor City, New Jersey, as well as the campus of Stockton University.

=== Federal, state, and county representation ===
Bass River Township is located in the 3rd Congressional district and is part of New Jersey's 8th state legislative district.

For the 119th United States Congress, New Jersey's 3rd congressional district is currently represented Herb Conaway (D, Delran Township). New Jersey is represented in the United States Senate by Democrats Cory Booker (Newark, term ends 2027) and Andy Kim (Moorestown, term ends 2031).

For the 2026–2027 session, the 8th legislative district of the New Jersey Legislature is represented in the New Jersey Senate by Latham Tiver (R, Southampton Township) and in the General Assembly by Anthony Angelozzi (D, Hammonton) and Andrea Katz (D, Chesterfield Township).

Burlington County is governed by a Board of County Commissioners comprised of five members who are chosen at-large in partisan elections to serve three-year terms of office on a staggered basis, with either one or two seats coming up for election each year; at an annual reorganization meeting, the board selects a director and deputy director from among its members to serve a one-year term. As of 2026, Burlington County's Commissioners are: Director Felicia Hopson (D, Willingboro Township, term as commissioner ends December 31, 2027; term as director ends 2026), Deputy Director Allison Eckel (D, Medford, term as commissioner ends 2028; term as deputy director ends 2026), Randy Brolo (D, Lumberton, 2026; elected to an unexpired term), Tyler Burrell (D, Delran Township, 2027) and Tom Pullion (D, Edgewater Park, 2026).

Burlington County's constitutional officers are Clerk Joanne Schwartz (D, Southampton Township, 2028), Sheriff James H. Kostoplis (D, Bordentown, 2028) and Surrogate Brian J. Carlin (D, Burlington Township, 2026).

=== Politics ===
United States presidential election results for Bass River Township 2024 2020 2016 2012 2008 2004
| Year | Republican | | Democratic | | Third party(ies) | |
| Year | No. | % | No. | % | No. | % |
|---|---|---|---|---|---|---|
| 2024 | 603 | 77.71% | 170 | 21.91% | 3 | 0.39% |
| 2020 | 618 | 73.57% | 213 | 25.36% | 9 | 1.07% |
| 2016 | 521 | 71.66% | 176 | 24.21% | 30 | 4.13% |
| 2012 | 371 | 59.65% | 236 | 37.94% | 15 | 2.41% |
| 2008 | 423 | 60.86% | 260 | 37.41% | 12 | 1.73% |
| 2004 | 408 | 62.10% | 240 | 36.53% | 9 | 1.37% |

As of March 2011, there were a total of 892 registered voters in Bass River Township, of which 187 (21.0% vs. 33.3% countywide) were registered as Democrats, 291 (32.6% vs. 23.9%) were registered as Republicans and 413 (46.3% vs. 42.8%) were registered as Unaffiliated. There as one voter registered to another party. Among the township's 2010 Census population, 61.8% (vs. 61.7% in Burlington County) were registered to vote, including 77.4% of those ages 18 and over (vs. 80.3% countywide).

Gubernatorial election results for Bass River Township
| Year | Republican | | Democratic | | Third party(ies) | |
| Year | No. | % | No. | % | No. | % |
|---|---|---|---|---|---|---|
| 2025 | 461 | 72.94% | 169 | 26.74% | 2 | 0.32% |
| 2021 | 479 | 80.64% | 108 | 18.18% | 7 | 1.18% |
| 2017 | 245 | 63.14% | 128 | 32.99% | 15 | 3.87% |
| 2013 | 314 | 73.54% | 100 | 23.42% | 13 | 3.04% |
| 2009 | 298 | 62.47% | 140 | 29.35% | 39 | 8.18% |
| 2005 | 223 | 55.33% | 149 | 36.97% | 31 | 7.69% |

In the 2012 presidential election, Republican Mitt Romney received 371 votes (59.0% vs. 40.2% countywide), ahead of Democrat Barack Obama with 236 votes (37.5% vs. 58.1%) and other candidates with 15 votes (2.4% vs. 1.0%), among the 629 ballots cast by the township's 945 registered voters, for a turnout of 66.6% (vs. 74.5% in Burlington County). In the 2008 presidential election, Republican John McCain received 423 votes (60.6% vs. 39.9% countywide), ahead of Democrat Barack Obama with 260 votes (37.2% vs. 58.4%) and other candidates with 12 votes (1.7% vs. 1.0%), among the 698 ballots cast by the township's 917 registered voters, for a turnout of 76.1% (vs. 80.0% in Burlington County). In the 2004 presidential election, Republican George W. Bush received 408 votes (61.8% vs. 46.0% countywide), ahead of Democrat John Kerry with 240 votes (36.4% vs. 52.9%) and other candidates with 9 votes (1.4% vs. 0.8%), among the 660 ballots cast by the township's 892 registered voters, for a turnout of 74.0% (vs. 78.8% in the whole county).

In the 2013 gubernatorial election, Republican Chris Christie received 314 votes (72.5% vs. 61.4% countywide), ahead of Democrat Barbara Buono with 100 votes (23.1% vs. 35.8%) and other candidates with 13 votes (3.0% vs. 1.2%), among the 433 ballots cast by the township's 964 registered voters, yielding a 44.9% turnout (vs. 44.5% in the county). In the 2009 gubernatorial election, Republican Chris Christie received 298 votes (62.1% vs. 47.7% countywide), ahead of Democrat Jon Corzine with 140 votes (29.2% vs. 44.5%), Independent Chris Daggett with 34 votes (7.1% vs. 4.8%) and other candidates with 5 votes (1.0% vs. 1.2%), among the 480 ballots cast by the township's 920 registered voters, yielding a 52.2% turnout (vs. 44.9% in the county).

United States Senate election results for Bass River Township1
| Year | Republican | | Democratic | | Third party(ies) | |
| Year | No. | % | No. | % | No. | % |
|---|---|---|---|---|---|---|
| 2024 | 549 | 74.49% | 175 | 23.74% | 13 | 1.76% |
| 2018 | 403 | 71.96% | 135 | 24.11% | 22 | 3.93% |
| 2012 | 343 | 58.53% | 232 | 39.59% | 11 | 1.88% |
| 2006 | 207 | 56.25% | 149 | 40.49% | 12 | 3.26% |

United States Senate election results for Bass River Township2
| Year | Republican | | Democratic | | Third party(ies) | |
| Year | No. | % | No. | % | No. | % |
|---|---|---|---|---|---|---|
| 2020 | 573 | 70.92% | 222 | 27.48% | 13 | 1.61% |
| 2014 | 222 | 63.61% | 118 | 33.81% | 9 | 2.58% |
| 2013 | 164 | 67.49% | 75 | 30.86% | 4 | 1.65% |
| 2008 | 374 | 58.16% | 244 | 37.95% | 25 | 3.89% |

== Education ==
The Bass River Township School District had served students in pre-kindergarten through sixth grade at Bass River Township Elementary School. The Bass River Township Elementary School was closed and students from the township began attending the schools of the Little Egg Harbor Township School District in the 2020–21 school year.

As of the 2024–25 school year, the Little Egg Harbor Township district, comprised of three schools, had an enrollment of 1,680 students and 136.2 classroom teachers (on an FTE basis), for a student–teacher ratio of 12.3:1. Schools in the district (with 2024–25 enrollment data from the National Center for Education Statistics.) are Robert C. Wood Sr. Early Childhood Center with 318 students in pre-kindergarten, George J. Mitchell Elementary School with 582 students in kindergarten through third grade and Frog Pond Elementary School with 780 students in grades 4 to 6.

Public school students in seventh through twelfth grades attend the schools of the Pinelands Regional School District, which also serves students from Bass River Township, Eagleswood Township and Tuckerton Borough. Schools in the district (with 2024–25 enrollment data from the National Center for Education Statistics) are Pinelands Regional Junior High School with 500 students in grades 7–8 and Pinelands Regional High School with 1,063 students in grades 9–12. The high school district's board of education is comprised of nine members directly elected by the residents of the constituent municipalities to three-year terms on a staggered basis, with three seats up for election each year. Bass River Township is allocated one of the nine seats.

Students from Bass River Township, and from all of Burlington County, are eligible to attend the Burlington County Institute of Technology, a countywide public school district that serves the vocational and technical education needs of students at the high school and post-secondary level at its campuses in Medford and Westampton Township.

== Transportation ==
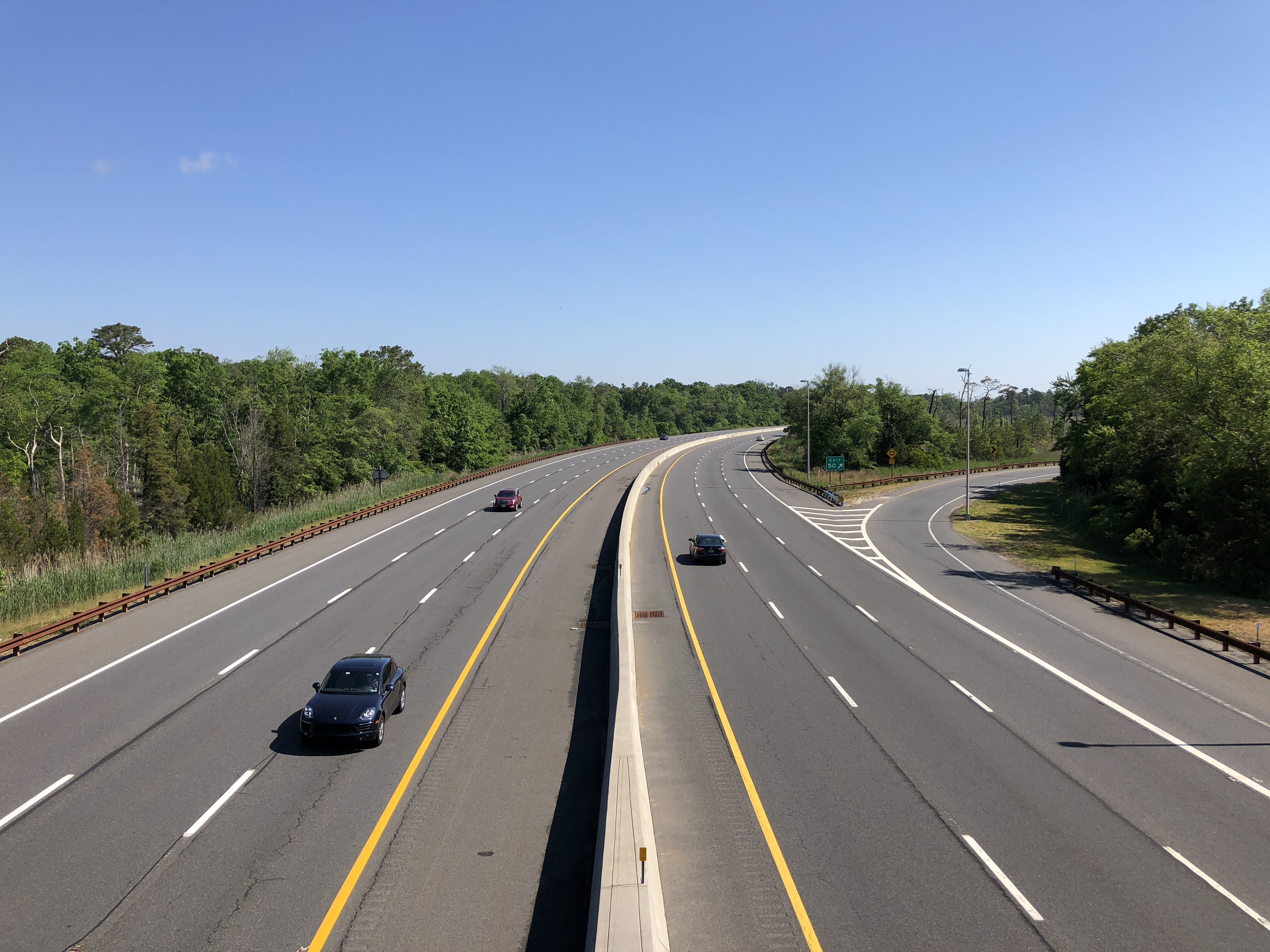
The Garden State Parkway at U.S. Route 9 in Bass River

=== Roads and highways ===
As of May 2010, the township had a total of 50.11 miles (80.64 km) of roadways, of which 23.48 miles (37.79 km) were maintained by the municipality, 14.63 miles (23.54 km) by Burlington County and 5.24 miles (8.43 km) by the New Jersey Department of Transportation and 6.76 miles (10.88 km) by the New Jersey Turnpike Authority.

Bass River Township is the only municipality in Burlington County that hosts U.S. Route 9 and the Garden State Parkway. The two roads enter from the southwest concurrently, then separate at Exit 50. Exit 50 is one of two partial interchanges on the parkway that are located in Bass River, with Exit 50 being northbound off-southbound on. The other exit, Exit 52 for County Route 654 in New Gretna, is northbound on-southbound off. The township also hosts a high-speed toll plaza on the mainline northbound Garden State Parkway.

Other state and county-maintained roads that pass through include Route 167 (a 0.15-mile (0.24 km) dead-ended old alignment of U.S. 9) and County Route 542.

=== Public transportation ===
NJ Transit provides service in the township on the 559 route that runs between Atlantic City and Lakewood Township.

== Warren Grove Gunnery Range ==
Warren Grove Gunnery Range is a military bomb practice range. Military planes, including A-10s and F-16s from East Coast Air National Guard units, use the area for practice bombing and strafing. Named for Warren Grove in adjacent Little Egg Harbor and Stafford townships, the range is actually located in Bass River Township.

=== Incidents ===
- In May 2007, flares dropped from an F-16 belonging to the 177th Fighter Wing set off a large wildfire that consumed more than 18,000 acres (73 km^{2}) of the Pinelands and forced the evacuation of hundreds of residents.
- In November 2004, an F-16 fired 25 rounds that hit the Little Egg Harbor Intermediate School.
- In January 2002, an aircraft practicing at Warren Grove crashed near the Garden State Parkway spewing flames and molten metal across the busy road.
- In June 2001, a 1,600 acres (6 km^{2}) forest fire occurred when an Air National Guard plane dropped a 25-pound (11 kg) practice bomb at the range.
- In April 1999, nearly 12,000 acres (49 km^{2}) of forest, wetlands, cedar swamp and cranberry bogs burned after a Fairchild Republic A-10 Thunderbolt II from the 111th Fighter Wing plane dropped a "dummy" bomb more than a mile from its target.

== Notable people ==
People who were born in, residents of, or otherwise closely associated with Bass River Township include:

- Andy Boswell (1873–1936), Major League Baseball pitcher who served in the New Jersey General Assembly
- Thomas A. Mathis (1869–1958), political boss and racketeer who served in the New Jersey Senate and was the Secretary of State of New Jersey
- Britt Rescigno, chef
