= New Gretna, New Jersey =

Populated place in Burlington County, New Jersey, US

- Census-designated place
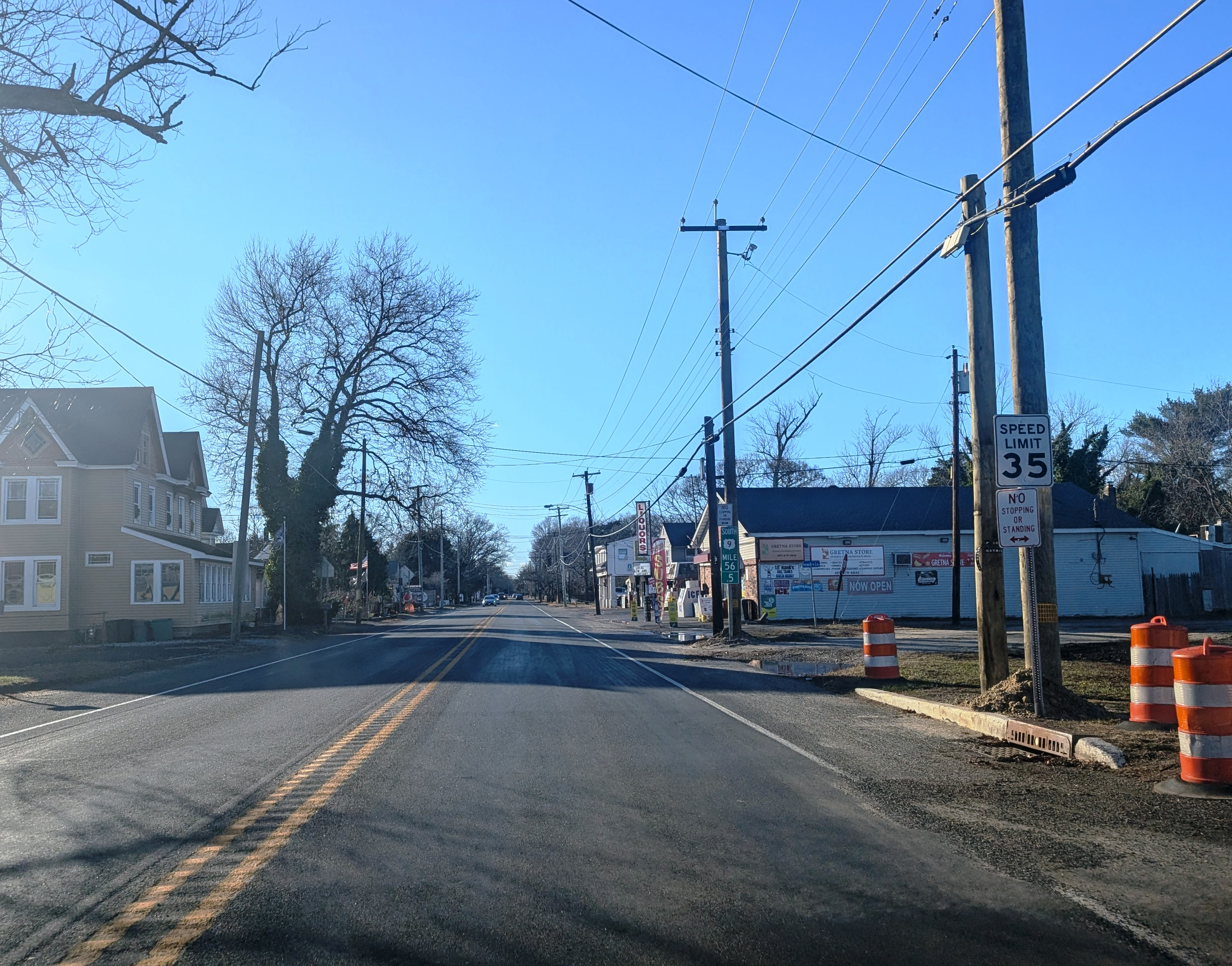
- U.S. Route 9 southbound in New Gretna

- Location in Burlington County Location in New Jersey Location in the United States
- Coordinates: 39°35′32″N 74°27′04″W
- Country: United States
- State: New Jersey
- County: Burlington
- Township: Bass River

Area
  - Total: 0.85 sq mi (2.21 km^{2})
  - Land: 0.85 sq mi (2.19 km^{2})
  - Water: 0.0077 sq mi (0.02 km^{2})
- Elevation: 6.6 ft (2 m)

Population (2020)
  - Total: 390
  - Density: 461.1/sq mi (178.03/km^{2})
- Time zone: UTC−05:00 (Eastern (EST))
  - Summer (DST): UTC−04:00 (Eastern (EDT))
- ZIP Code: 08224
- FIPS code: 34-51450
- GNIS feature ID: 878737

New Gretna (pronounced /gɹ'εtnʌ/) is an unincorporated community and census-designated place (CDP) located within Bass River Township in Burlington County, in the U.S. state of New Jersey. The area is served as United States Postal Service ZIP Code 08224.

As of the 2020 census, New Gretna had a population of 390.

The Bead Wreck Site at New Gretna is listed on the National Register of Historic Places as site #88001899.

New Gretna was named after Gretna Green in Scotland.

== Demographics ==
Historical population
| Census | Pop. | Note | %± |
|---|---|---|---|
| 2020 | 390 | | — |
U.S. Decennial Census; 2020

New Gretna was first listed as a census designated place in the 2020 U.S. census.

New Gretna CDP, New Jersey – Racial and ethnic composition Note: the US Census treats Hispanic/Latino as an ethnic category. This table excludes Latinos from the racial categories and assigns them to a separate category. Hispanics/Latinos may be of any race.
| Race / Ethnicity (NH = Non-Hispanic) | Pop 2020 | 2020 |
|---|---|---|
| White alone (NH) | 352 | 90.26% |
| Black or African American alone (NH) | 0 | 0.00% |
| Native American or Alaska Native alone (NH) | 0 | 0.00% |
| Asian alone (NH) | 0 | 0.00% |
| Native Hawaiian or Pacific Islander alone (NH) | 0 | 0.00% |
| Other race alone (NH) | 0 | 0.00% |
| Mixed race or Multiracial (NH) | 14 | 3.59% |
| Hispanic or Latino (any race) | 24 | 6.15% |
| Total | 390 | 100.00% |

As of the 2020 United States census, the population was 390.

== Transportation ==
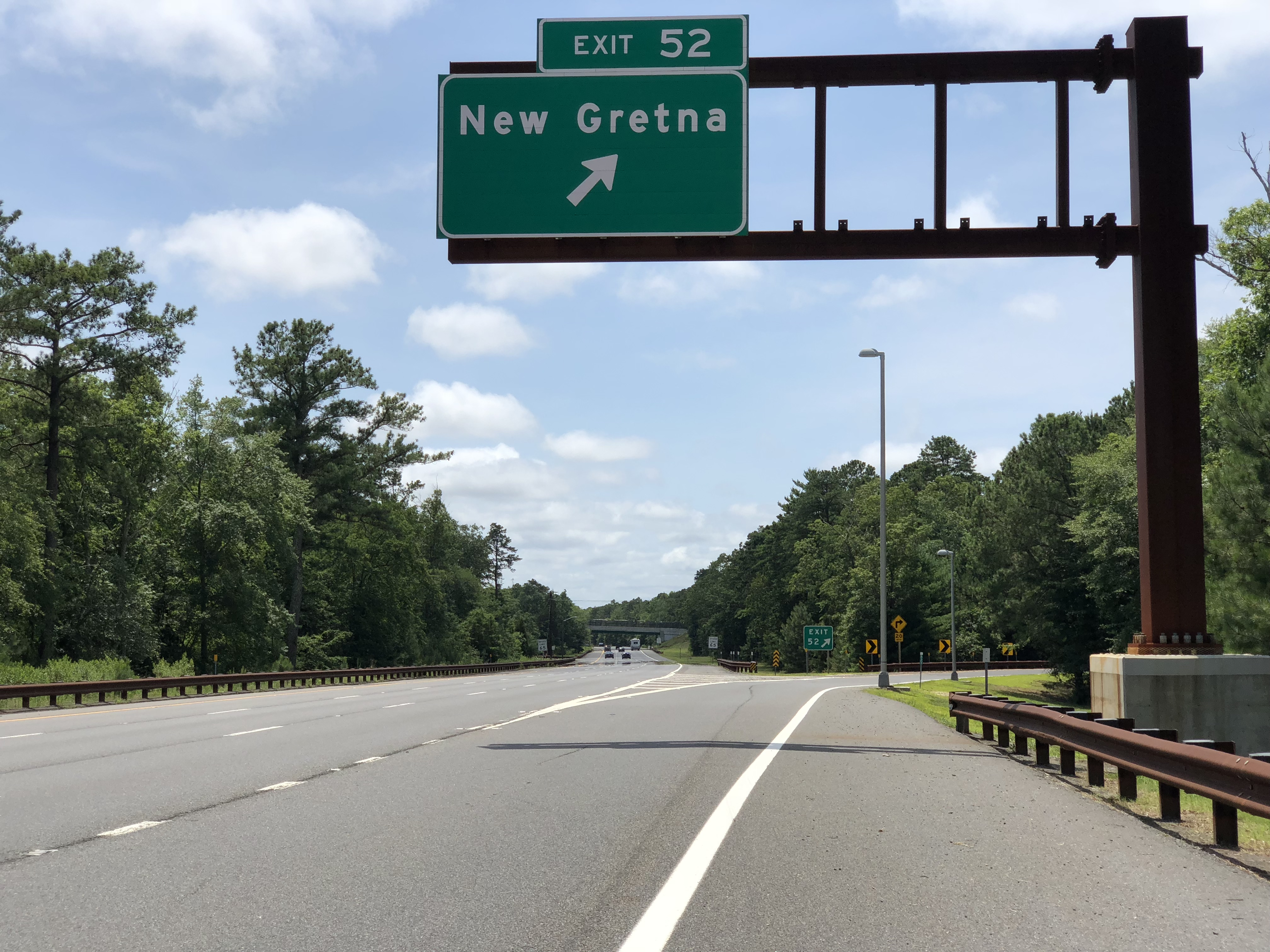
Garden State Parkway southbound at exit 52 for New Gretna

New Jersey Transit provides bus service to and from Atlantic City on the 559 route. New Gretna is served by exits 50 and 52 of the Garden State Parkway.

== Notable people ==
- Britt Rescigno, chef
