= Attila (clothing) =

Braided Hungarian shell-jacket

The attila is an elaborately braided Hungarian shell-jacket or short coat, decorated with lace and knots. Historically it was part of the uniform of the Hungarian cavalry known as hussars (or huszárs). It was a part of the everyday wear of rural men as well as members of the nobility and officials.

The attila was made in many styles and many colors including black, gray, blue, green, red and white. Some of these overlapped with the Turkish dolman. The origins of the attila are believed to go back to the 16th century when Hungarians adopted the practice of wearing their short coats slung on one shoulder. When worn in this fashion the jacket was often referred to as a pelisse. In cold or wet weather the attila could be buttoned across the chest and worn as a conventional jacket.

One possibly mythical account, reported by an English general, is that one night a Hungarian cavalry unit was attacked by the Turks and had no time to dress properly. Instead they just threw on their short coats half shouldered and went into battle. Supposedly the Turks on seeing the "flying sleeves of the short coats", thought that they were fighting men who had more than two arms, and fled.

Other accounts suggest that Hungarian hussars wore their short coat slung over one shoulder to provide limited protection from glancing sword blows. Earlier Hungarian horsemen had used slung animal skins as a shield in this way. After 1850 the Austro-Hungarian cavalry attila became longer. In 1892 the attila also became part of the Hungarian forester's ceremonial uniform. It was dark green or black with seven golden braids and golden buttons. During the late 18th and 19th centuries hussar regiments were raised in many European and Latin American armies and the fur trimmed pelisse, worn over a braided attila or dolman, often continued to be worn in the slung fashion described. By the mid-19th century the attila had become part of the ceremonial uniform of the Royal Netherlands East Indies Army

Michael Kovats, the Hungarian hussar, who recruited, trained, organized, and led some of the first American cavalry into battle, wore an attila as part of his uniform.

== See also ==
- Dolman
- Hussar
- Michael de Kovats
