= Kingdom of Hungary =

Central European monarchy (1000–1946)

Coordinates: 47°29′46″N 19°02′22″E

Kingdom of Hungary Names ↓ Magyar Királyság (Hungarian) Regnum Hungariae (Latin) Königreich Ungarn (German)
- 1000–1918 (Note: After the death of King Louis II at the Battle of Mohács in 1526, Hungarian noble groups elected two kings dividing Hungary in two: Royal Hungary and the Eastern Hungarian Kingdom. During the Ottoman occupation between 1541 and 1699, the Kingdom of Hungary was divided into three separate parts: Royal Hungary 1526–1699; Eastern Hungarian Kingdom 1526–1570 which became the Principality of Transylvania 1570–1711; Ottoman Hungary 1541–1699; (see below...)); 1920–1946
- Top: 1915–1918; Bottom: 1915–1918, 1919–1946 Royal coat of arms of the Kingdom of Hungary (1915–1918) Coat of arms (1915–1918, 1919–1946)
- Motto: Regnum Mariae Patronae Hungariae (Latin); Mária királysága, Magyarország védőnője (Hungarian); Kingdom of Mary, the Patroness of Hungary (English)
- Anthem: "Himnusz" (1844–1946) "Hymn" Royal anthem God save, God protect Our Emperor, Our Country! (1797–1918)
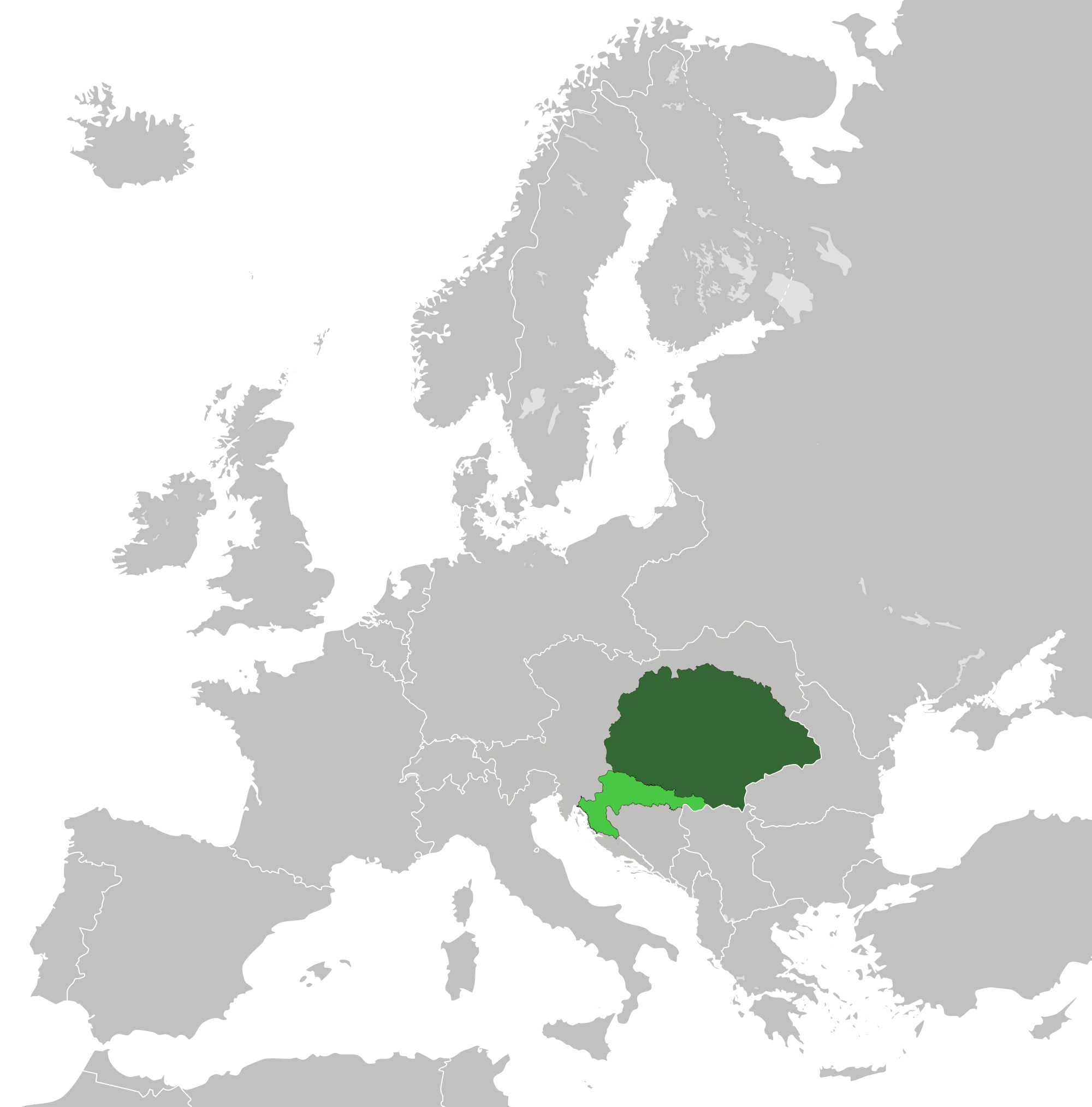
- Capital: Budapest Historical capitals: Esztergom (1000–1256); Temesvár (1315–1323); Visegrád (1323–1408); Buda (1256–1315; 1408–1485; 1490–1541; 1783–1873); Bécs (1485–1490); Pozsony (1536–1848); Buda (1848–1873); Budapest (1873–1946); Debrecen (temporary: 1849; 1944); Székesfehérvár (place of diets, royal seat, crowning and burial site from 1000 to 1543)
- Official languages: Latin (ceremonial/liturgical/administrative until 1844); German (1784–1790; 1849–1867); Hungarian (1836–1849; 1867–1946); Italian (1871–1918, Fiume); Other spoken languages: Carpathian Romani, Croatian, Polish, Romanian, Ruthenian, Serbian, Slovak, Slovene, Yiddish
- Religion: Catholicism (Latin and Eastern Catholic), Calvinism, Lutheranism, Eastern Orthodoxy, Unitarianism, Judaism
- Demonym: Hungarian
- Government: Feudal monarchy (1000–1301); Absolute monarchy (1301–1868); Unitary parliamentary constitutional monarchy (1848–1918; 1920–1946)
- Monarch
  - 1000–1038 (first): Stephen I
  - 1916–1918 (last): Charles IV
  - 1945-1946 (Regency Council): High National Council
- Palatine
  - 1009–1038 (first): Samuel Aba
  - 1847–1848 (last): Stephen Francis Victor
- Prime Minister
  - 1848 (first): Lajos Batthyány
  - 1945–1946 (last): Zoltán Tildy
- Legislature: Diet (from the 1290s)
  - Upper house: House of Magnates (1867–1918; 1926–1945)
  - Lower house: House of Representatives (1867–1918; 1927–1945)
- Historical era: 2nd millennium
  - Coronation of Stephen I: 25 December 1000
  - Golden Bull of 1222: 24 April 1222
  - First Mongol-Tatar invasion: 1241–1242
  - Triumph of Nándorfehérvár: 4–22 July 1456
  - Reign of Matthias Corvinus: 1458–1490
  - Battle of Mohács: 29 August 1526
  - Ottoman occupation of Buda: 29 August 1541
  - Recapture of Buda: 9 September 1686
  - Treaty of Karlowitz: 26 January 1699
  - Rákóczi's War of Independence: 1703–1711
  - Hungarian Revolution and War of Independence: 1848–1849
  - Monarchy abolished: 1 February 1946

Area
- 1200: 282,870 km^{2} (109,220 sq mi)
- 1910: 282,870 km^{2} (109,220 sq mi)
- 1930: 93,073 km^{2} (35,936 sq mi)
- 1941: 172,149 km^{2} (66,467 sq mi)

Population
  - 1200: 2,000,000
  - 1790: 8,000,000
  - 1910: 18,264,533
  - 1930: 8,688,319
  - 1941: 14,669,100
- Currency: Florentinus (1325–1553); Thaler; Florin (1754–1867); Forint (1867–1892); Korona (1892–1918); Korona (1919–1926); Pengő (1927–1946); Adópengő (1946)
Preceded by
Principality of Hungary
Hungary
Succeeded by
Hungary (First)
Czechoslovakia
Romania
Yugoslavia
Austria
Hungary (Second)
- Today part of: Hungary

The Kingdom of Hungary was a monarchy in Central Europe that existed for nearly a millennium, from 1000 to 1946. The Catholic kingdom emerged as a continuation of the Grand Principality of Hungary upon the coronation of the first king Stephen I at Esztergom around 1000; his family (the Árpád dynasty) led the monarchy for 300 years. By the 12th century, the kingdom had become a European power.

Due to the Ottoman occupation of the central and southern territories of Hungary in the 16th century, the country was partitioned into three parts: the Habsburg Royal Hungary, Ottoman Hungary, and the semi-independent Principality of Transylvania. The House of Habsburg held the Hungarian throne after the Battle of Mohács in 1526 continuously until 1918 and also played a key role in the wars against the Ottoman Empire and the eventual expulsion of the Turks during and after the Great Turkish War.

The Hungarians fought many wars of independence against the Habsburgs, including in 1604–06, 1664–71, 1680–85, 1703–11, and 1848–49. From 1867, territories connected to the Hungarian crown were incorporated into Austria-Hungary under the name of Lands of the Crown of Saint Stephen. The monarchy ended with the deposition of the last king Charles IV in 1918, after which Hungary became a republic. The kingdom was nominally restored during the "Regency" of 1920–46, ending under the Soviet occupation in 1946.

The Kingdom of Hungary was a multiethnic state from its inception until the Treaty of Trianon and it covered what is today Hungary, Slovakia, Transylvania and other parts of Romania, Carpathian Ruthenia (now part of Ukraine), Vojvodina (now part of Serbia), the territory of Burgenland (now part of Austria), Međimurje (now part of Croatia), Prekmurje (now part of Slovenia) and a few villages which are now part of Poland. From 1102, it also included the Kingdom of Croatia, being in personal union with it, united under the King of Hungary.

According to Hungarian demographers, about 80 percent of the population was made up of Hungarians before the Battle of Mohács, however in the mid-19th century out of a population of 14 million less than 6 million were Hungarian due to the resettlement policies and continuous immigration from neighboring countries. The loss of 72% of Hungary as a result of the post-World War I Treaty of Trianon (reinforced by the post-World War II Treaty of Paris) made the remnant of Hungary ethnically homogeneous. More than nine-tenths of the population of modern Hungary is ethnically Hungarian and speaks Hungarian as their mother tongue.

Today, the feast day of the first king Stephen I (20 August) is a national holiday in Hungary, commemorating the foundation of the state (Foundation Day).

== Names ==
The Latin forms Regnum Hungariae or Ungarie (Regnum meaning kingdom); Regnum Marianum (Kingdom of Mary); or simply Hungaria, were the names used in official documents in Latin from the beginning of the kingdom to the 1840s.

The German name (Königreich Ungarn) was used officially from 1784 to 1790; it was used again between 1849 and the 1860s.

The Hungarian name (Magyar Királyság) was used in the 1840s, and then again from the 1860s to 1946. The unofficial Hungarian name of the kingdom was Magyarország, which is still the colloquial, and also the official name of Hungary.

The names in the other native languages of the kingdom were: Polish: Królestwo Węgier, Romanian: Regatul Ungariei, Serbian: Kraljevina Ugarska, Croatian: Kraljevina Ugarska, Slovene: Kraljevina Ogrska, Slovak: Uhorské kráľovstvo, and Italian (for the city of Fiume), Regno d'Ungheria.

In Austria-Hungary (1867–1918), the unofficial name Transleithania was sometimes used to denote the regions of the Kingdom of Hungary. Officially, the term Lands of the Crown of Saint Stephen was included for the Hungarian part of Austria-Hungary, although this term was also in use prior to that time.

== Capital cities ==
Name	Time period
Székesfehérvár	1000–1543
Esztergom	1000–1256
Buda	1256–1315
Temesvár (now Timișoara)	1315–1323
Visegrád	1323–1408
Buda	1408–1485
Vienna (Bécs)	1485–1490
Buda	1490–1536 (1541)
Lippa (now Lipova) – Eastern Hungarian Kingdom	1541–1542
Gyulafehérvár (now Alba Iulia) – Eastern Hungarian Kingdom	1542–1570
Pressburg (Pozsony, now Bratislava)	1536–1848
Buda	1848–1849
Debrecen	1849
Buda	1849–1873
Budapest	1873–1944
Debrecen	1944
Budapest	1944–1946

== History ==
=== Origins ===
The Hungarians, led by Árpád (who might have been either their sacred ruler known as a kende or their military leader known as a gyula), settled the Carpathian Basin in 895 and established the Principality of Hungary (896–1000). The Hungarians led several successful incursions to Western Europe, until they were stopped by Otto I, Holy Roman Emperor in Battle of Lechfeld.

=== Middle Ages ===
==== High Middle Ages ====
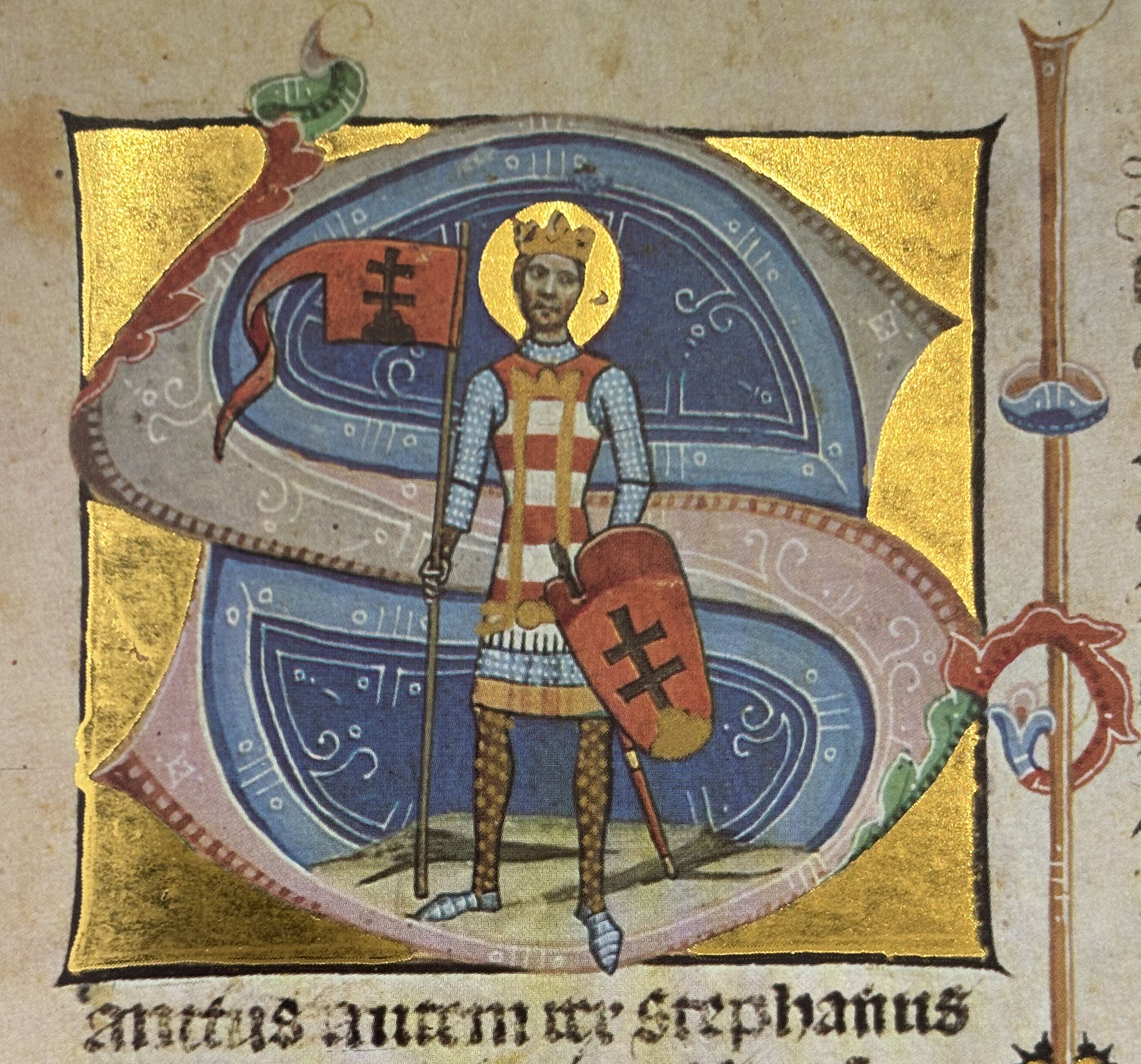
King Stephen I of Hungary (Illuminated Chronicle)

The principality was succeeded by the Christian Kingdom of Hungary with the coronation of St Stephen I (son of principal Géza. Originally called Vajk until baptized) at Esztergom on Christmas Day 1000. The first kings of the kingdom were from the Árpád dynasty. He fought against Koppány and in 998, with Bavarian help, defeated him near Veszprém. The Catholic Church received powerful support from Stephen I, who with Christian Hungarians and German knights wanted a Christian kingdom established in Central Europe. Stephen I of Hungary was canonized as a Catholic saint in 1083 and an Eastern Orthodox saint in 2000. Around the 11th century, the Kingdom of Hungary became a Christian state, and Catholicism in the Hungarian Kingdom was a state religion.

After his death, a period of revolts and conflict for supremacy ensued between the royalty and the nobles. In 1051, armies of the Holy Roman Empire tried to conquer Hungary, but they were defeated at Vértes Mountain. The armies of the Holy Roman Empire continued to suffer defeats; the second greatest battle was at the town now called Bratislava, in 1052. Before 1052, Peter Orseolo, a supporter of the Holy Roman Empire, was overthrown by king Samuel Aba of Hungary.

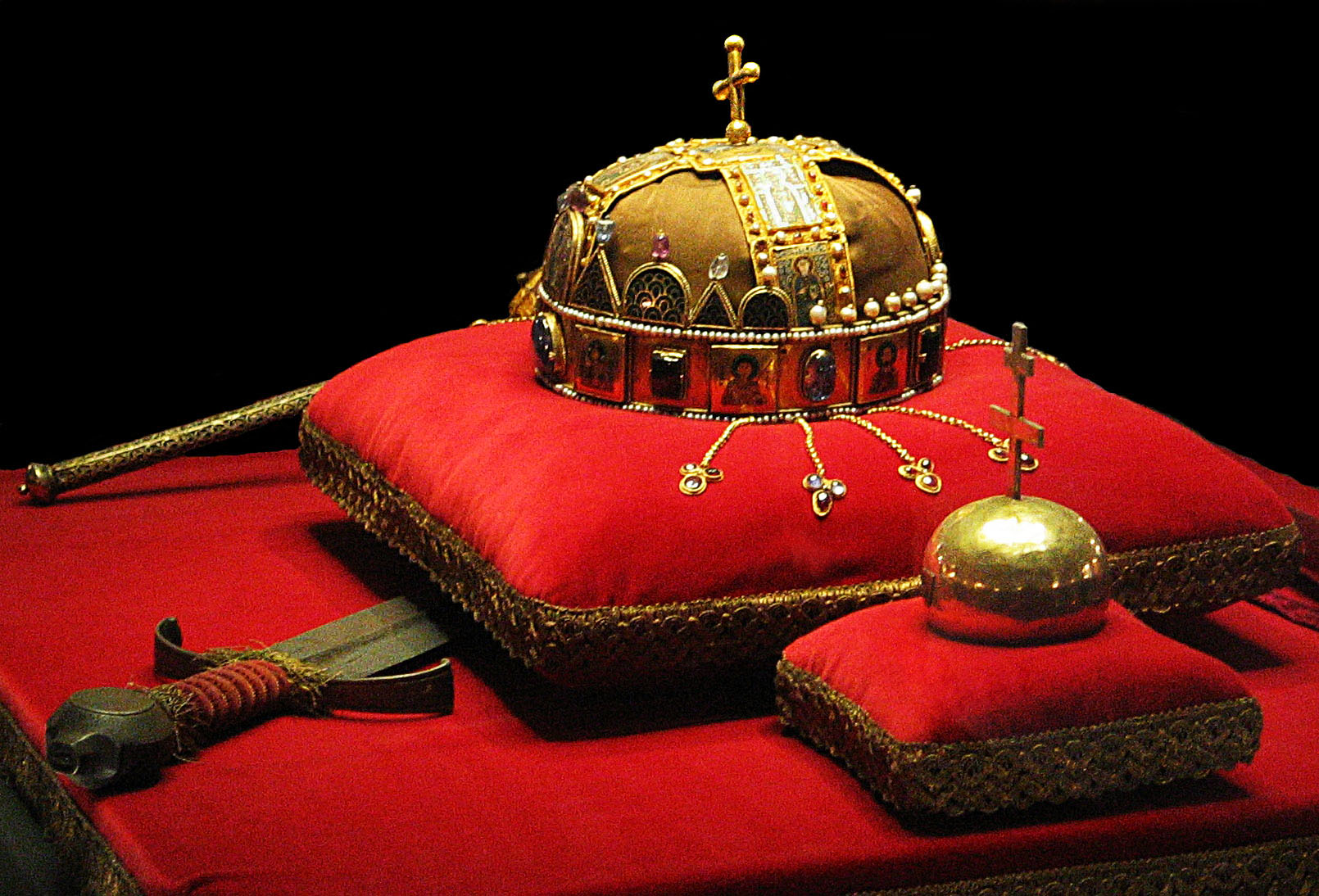
The Holy Crown of Hungary along with other regalia

This period of revolts ended during the reign of Béla I. Hungarian chroniclers praised Béla I for introducing new currency, such as the silver denarius, and for his benevolence to the former followers of his nephew, Solomon. He was succeeded by Ladislaus I of Hungary, who further stabilized and strengthened the kingdom. He was also canonized as a saint. Under his rule Hungarians successfully fought against the Cumans and acquired parts of Croatia in 1091. Due to a dynastic crisis in Croatia, with the help of the local nobility who supported his claim, he managed to swiftly seize power in northern parts of the Croatian kingdom (Slavonia), as he was a claimant to the throne due to the fact that his sister was married to the late Croatian king Zvonimir who died without an heir.

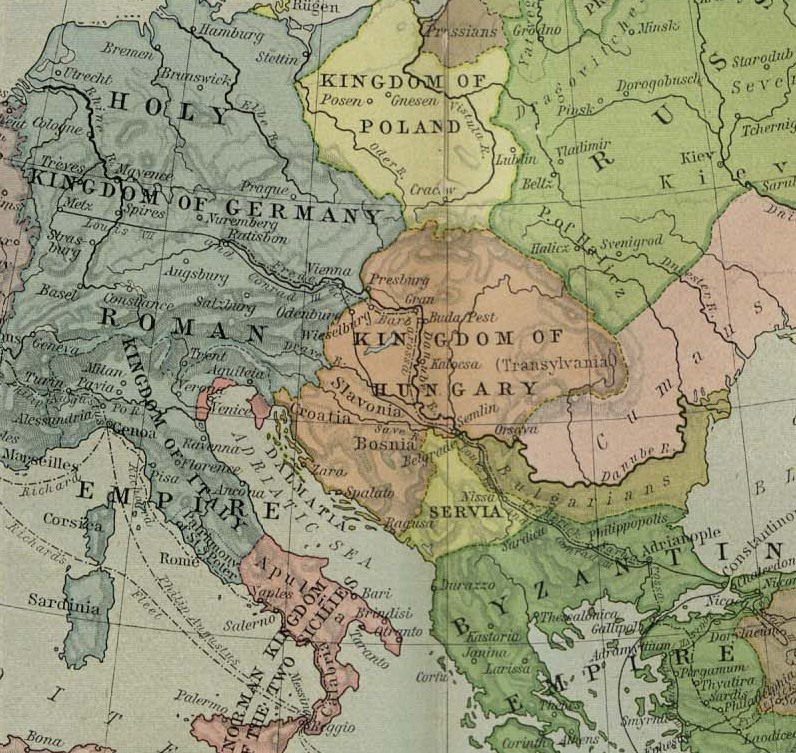
Hungary (including Croatia) in 1190, during the rule of Béla III

However, kingship over all of Croatia would not be achieved until the reign of his successor Coloman. With the coronation of King Coloman as "King of Croatia and Dalmatia" in Biograd in 1102, the two kingdoms of Croatia and Hungary were united under one crown. Although the precise terms of this relationship became a matter of dispute in the 19th century, it is believed that Coloman created a kind of personal union between the two kingdoms. The nature of the relationship varied through time, Croatia retained a large degree of internal autonomy overall, while the real power rested in the hands of the local nobility. Modern Croatian and Hungarian historiographies mostly view the relations between Kingdom of Croatia (1102–1526) and Kingdom of Hungary from 1102 as a form of a personal union, i.e. that they were connected by a common king. Also, one of the greatest Hungarian jurists and statesmen of the 16th century, István Werbőczy in his work Tripartitum treats Croatia as a kingdom separate to Hungary.

Especially Arabic and Byzantine travelers from this time praised the richness country, the dense pastures, the nicely cultivated lands, the plentiful animals in waters and forests. They said that the wheat is cheap, the markets are populous, the cities flourish and the folk are wealthy. Although it is hardly credible that they refer to all layers of society, the documents were inspired by the reality.

===== 13th century: Mongol invasion and recovery =====
In 1222, Andrew II issued the Golden Bull which laid down the principles of law.

In 1241, Hungary was invaded by the Mongols and while the first minor battles with Subutai's vanguard probes ended in seeming Hungarian victories, the Mongols finally destroyed the combined Hungarian and Cuman armies at the Battle of Mohi. The Mongol invasions ultimately resulted in the death of 15-25% of Hungary's population, some 300,000-500,000 people in total. In 1242, after the end of the Mongol invasion, numerous fortresses to defend against future invasion were erected by Béla IV of Hungary. In gratitude, the Hungarians acclaimed him as the "Second Founder of the Homeland", and the Hungarian Kingdom again became a considerable force in Europe.

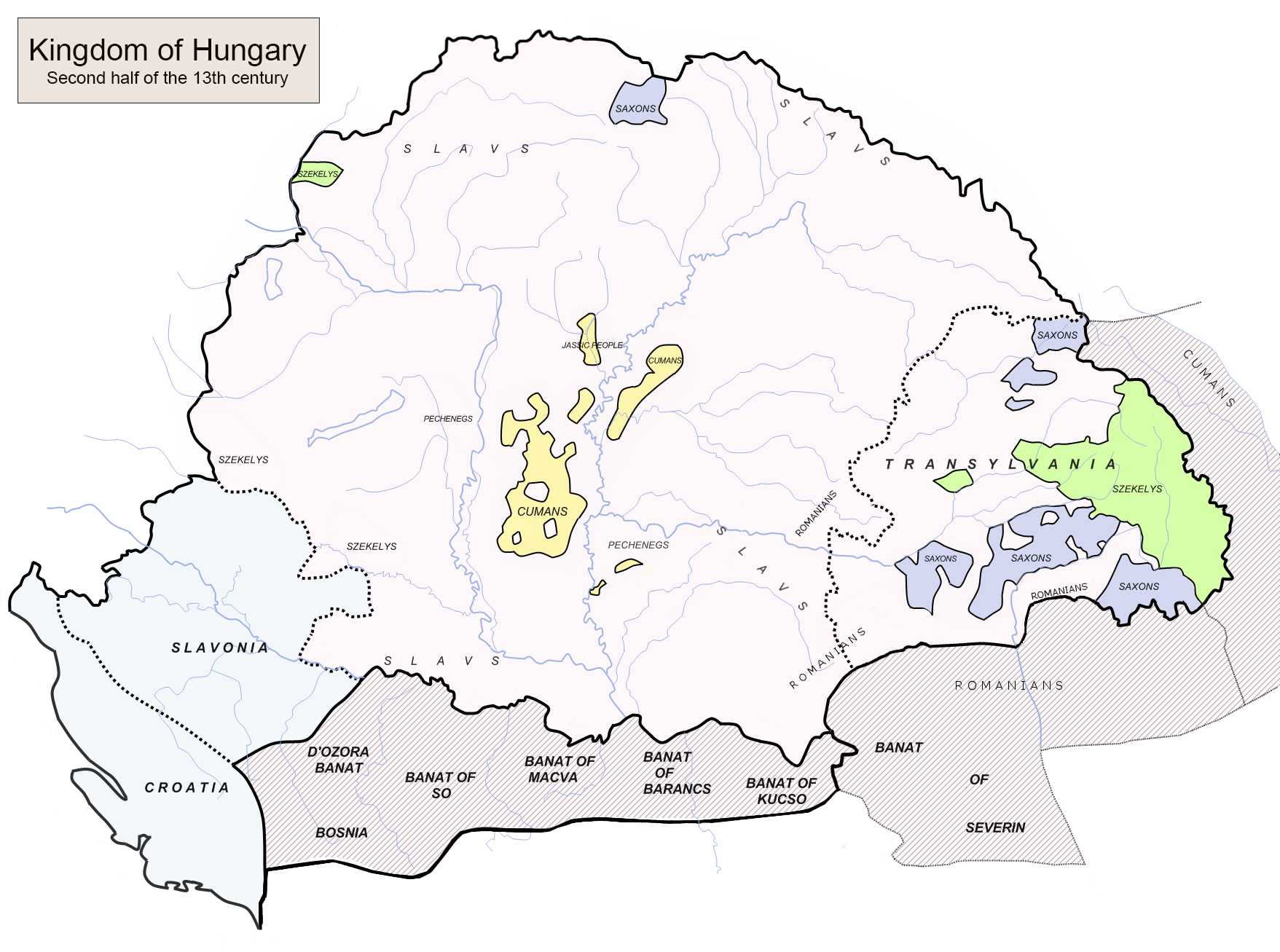
Local autonomies (including Cumania, Székely Land in Transylvania, Zipser Saxons in Szepes County, and Transylvanian Saxons in Transylvania - represented by the Transylvanian Saxon University) in the late 13th century

In 1260 Béla IV lost the War of the Babenberg Succession, his army was defeated at the Battle of Kressenbrunn by the united Bohemian forces. However, in 1278, Ladislaus IV of Hungary and Austrian troops fully destroyed the Bohemian army at the Battle on the Marchfeld.

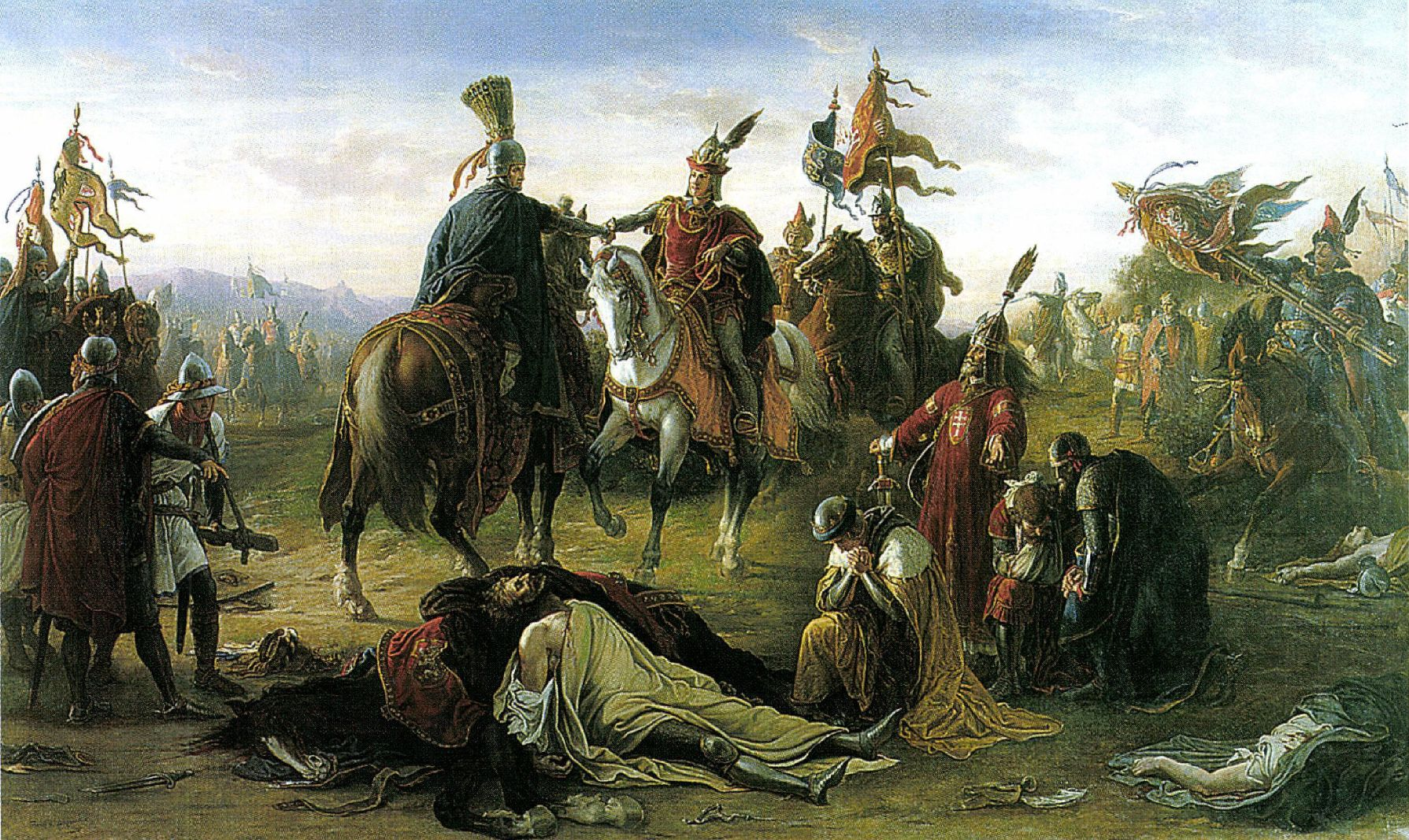
The Meeting of Ladislaus IV and Rudolf I during the Battle on the Marchfeld, painting by Mór Than (1873)

==== Late Middle Ages ====
The Árpád dynasty died out in 1301 with the death of Andrew III. Subsequently, Hungary was ruled by the Angevins until the end of the 14th century, and then by several non-dynastic rulers – notably Sigismund, Holy Roman Emperor and Matthias Corvinus – until the early 16th century.

===== The Anjou Age =====
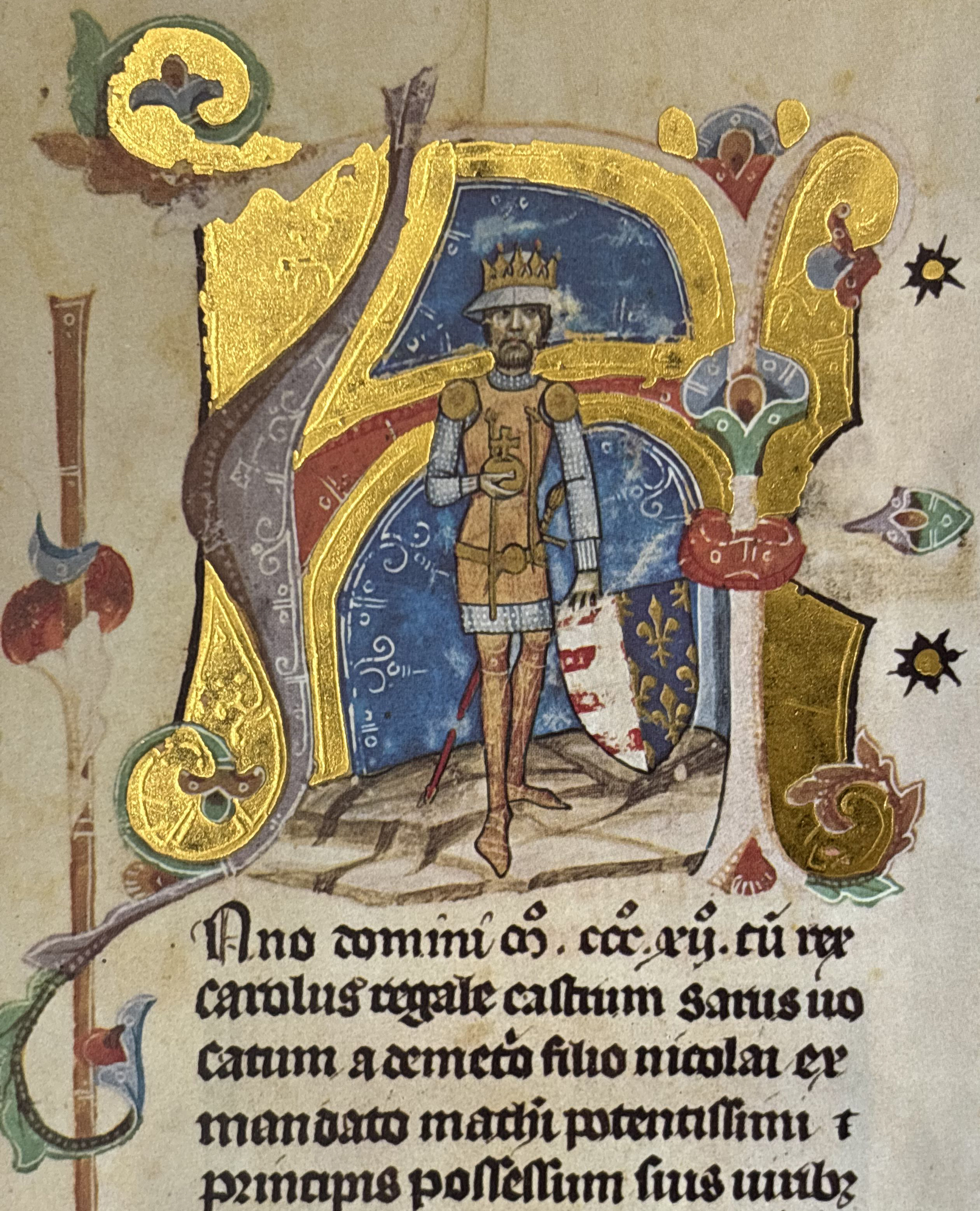
King Charles I of Hungary (Illuminated Chronicle)

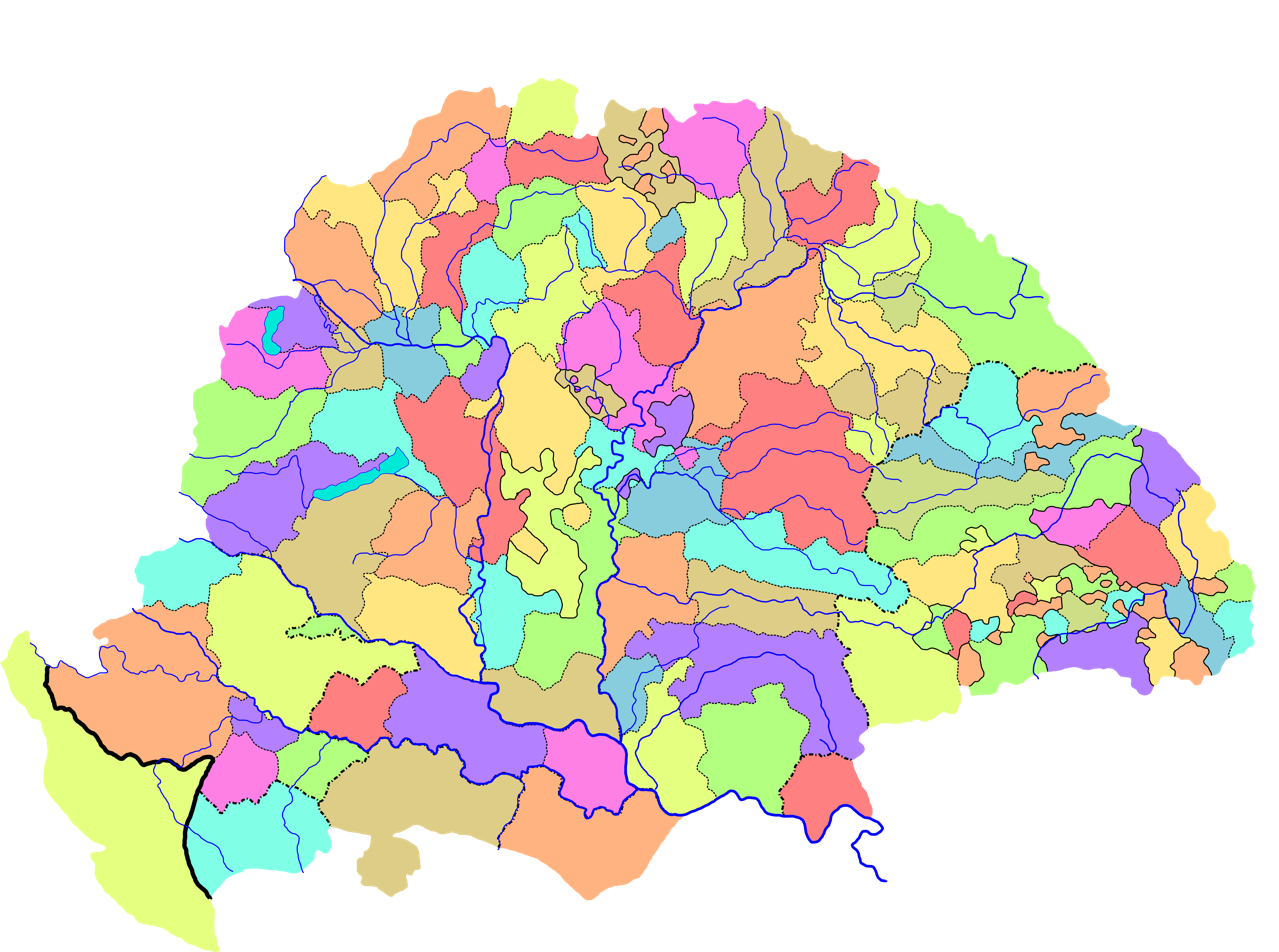
The administrative divisions of medieval Hungary

When Andrew III's predecessor, Ladislaus IV, was assassinated in 1290, another nobleman was set up as titular King of Hungary: Charles Martel of Anjou. Charles Martel was the son of King Charles II of Naples and Mary of Hungary, the sister of Ladislaus IV. However, Andrew III took the crown for himself and ruled without inconvenience after Charles Martel's death in 1295. Upon Andrew's death in 1301, the country was divided between powerful lords hostile to each other. A coalition of some of these oligarchs first crowned Wenceslaus III, who quickly fled from the anarchy, then Otto III, who was forced to leave by the Kán family. Charles, remaining as the only candidate, was finally crowned King Charles I in 1310. His famous battle at Rozgony, described as "most cruel battle since the Mongol invasion of Europe" by the Chronicon Pictum, ended his war of reunification.

He implemented considerable economic reforms and defeated the remaining nobility who were in opposition to royal rule, led by Máté Csák III. The kingdom of Hungary reached an age of prosperity and stability under Charles I. The gold mines of the Kingdom were extensively worked and soon Hungary reached a prominent standing in European gold production. The forint was introduced as a currency, replacing the denars, and soon after Charles's reforms were implemented, the economy of the Kingdom started to prosper again, having fallen into a parlous state following the Mongol invasion.

Charles exalted the cult to Saint Ladislaus I, using him as a symbol of bravery, justice and purity. He also venerated his uncle, Saint Louis of Toulouse. On the other hand, he gave importance to the cults of the princesses Saint Elizabeth and Saint Margaret, which added relevance to the lineage inheritance through the feminine branches.

Charles restored the royal power which had fallen into feudal lords' hands, and then made the lords swear loyalty to him. For this, he founded the Order of Saint George in 1326, which was the first secular chivalric order in the world, and included the most important noblemen of the Kingdom.

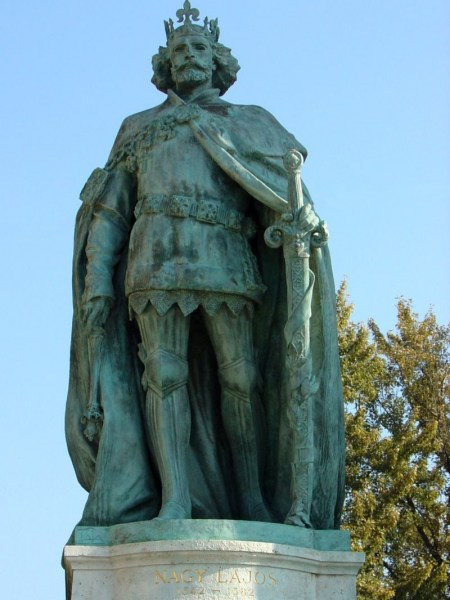
Louis I of Hungary on Heroes Square, Budapest

Charles married four times. His fourth wife was Elizabeth, the daughter of Władysław I of Poland. When Charles died in 1342, his eldest son by Elizabeth succeeded him as Louis I. In the first years of his reign, Louis was advised closely by his mother, making her one of the most influential personalities in the Kingdom.

Charles had arranged the marriage of his second son, Andrew, with his cousin Joanna, the granddaughter of King Robert of Naples, in 1332. Robert died in 1343, bequeathing his kingdom to Joanna but excluding the claim of Andrew. In 1345, a group of noble Neapolitan conspirators murdered Andrew at Aversa. Almost immediately, Louis declared war on Naples, conducting a first campaign in 1347–1348 and a second in 1350. He eventually signed peace with Joanna in 1352. Louis also waged wars against the Serbian Empire and the Golden Horde, restoring the Hungarian monarchs' authority over territories along the frontiers which had been lost during the previous decades.

In 1370, Louis's uncle, Casimir III of Poland, died without male issue. Louis succeeded him, thus establishing the first union of Hungary and Poland. This lasted until 1382 when Louis himself died without male issue; his two daughters, Mary and Jadwiga, then ascended the thrones of Hungary and Poland respectively.

===== The Age of Sigismund =====
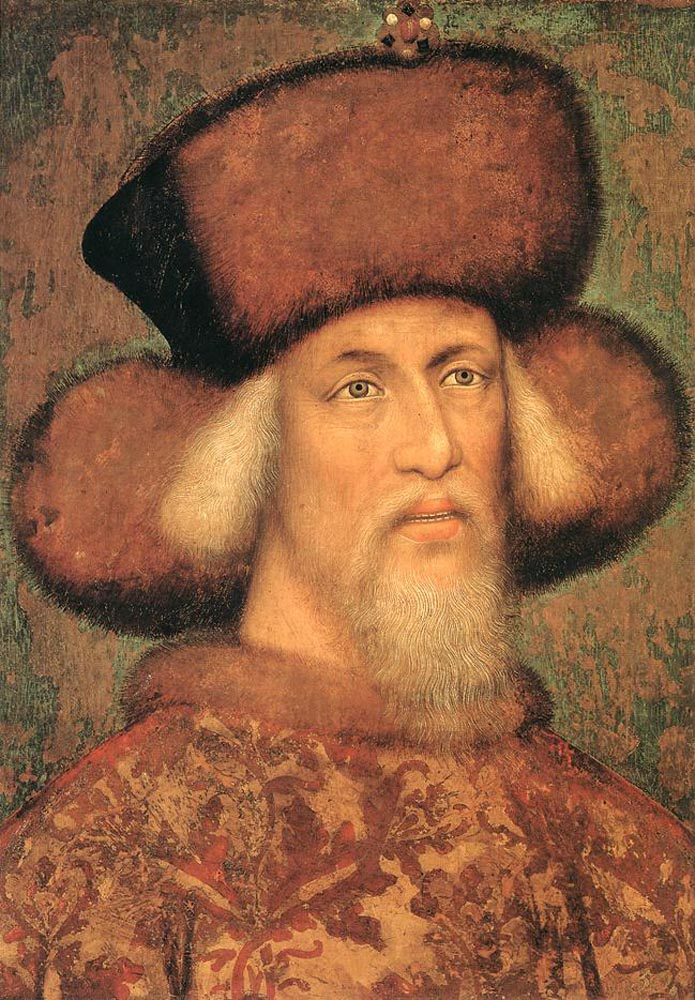
King Sigismund of Hungary

Louis I of Hungary always kept good and close relationships with the Holy Roman Emperor Charles IV of Luxembourg and finally proclaimed Charles's son Sigismund of Luxembourg to succeed him as the co-ruler of Louis' daughter and Sigismund's bride, Mary. Initially, Mary reigned as a sole monarch which led to turmoil, perhaps due to gender expectations of the time. Sigismund married her in 1385 and finally became a co-ruler in 1387. After his wife's death in 1395, he remained alone on the throne. Sigismund became a renowned king who created many improvements in the Hungarian law system and who rebuilt the palaces of Buda and Visegrád. He brought materials from Austria and Bohemia and ordered the creation of the most luxurious building in all of central Europe. In his laws can be seen the traces of the early mercantilism. He worked hard to keep the nobility under his control. A great part of his reign was dedicated to the fight with the Ottoman Empire, which started to extend its frontiers and influence to Europe. In 1396 was fought the Battle of Nicopolis against the Ottomans, which resulted in a defeat for the Hungarian-French forces led by Sigismund and Philip of Artois, Count of Eu. However, Sigismund continued to successfully contain the Ottoman forces outside of the Kingdom for the rest of his life.

Losing popularity among the Hungarian nobility, Sigismund soon became victim of an attempt against his rule, and Ladislaus of Anjou-Durazzo (the son of the murdered King of Naples Charles II of Hungary) was called in and crowned. Since the ceremony was not performed with the Hungarian Holy Crown, and in the city of Székesfehérvár, it was considered illegitimate. Ladislaus stayed only few days in Hungarian territory and soon left it, no longer an inconvenience for Sigismund. In 1408 he founded the Order of the Dragon, which included most of the relevant monarchs and noblemen of that region of Europe at that time. In 1410, he was elected King of the Romans, making him the supreme monarch over the German territories. He had to deal with the Hussite movement, a religious reformist group that was born in Bohemia, and he presided at the Council of Constance, where the theologist founder Jan Hus, was judged. In 1419, Sigismund inherited the Crown of Bohemia after the death of his brother Wenceslaus of Luxembourg, obtaining the formal control of three medieval states, but he struggled for control of Bohemia until the peace agreement with the Hussites and his coronation in 1436. In 1433, was crowned as Holy Roman Emperor by the Pope and ruled until his death in 1437, leaving as his only heir his daughter Elizabeth of Luxembourg and her husband. The marriage of Elizabeth was arranged with the Duke Albert V of Austria, who was later crowned as King Albert of Hungary in 1437.

===== Hunyadi family =====
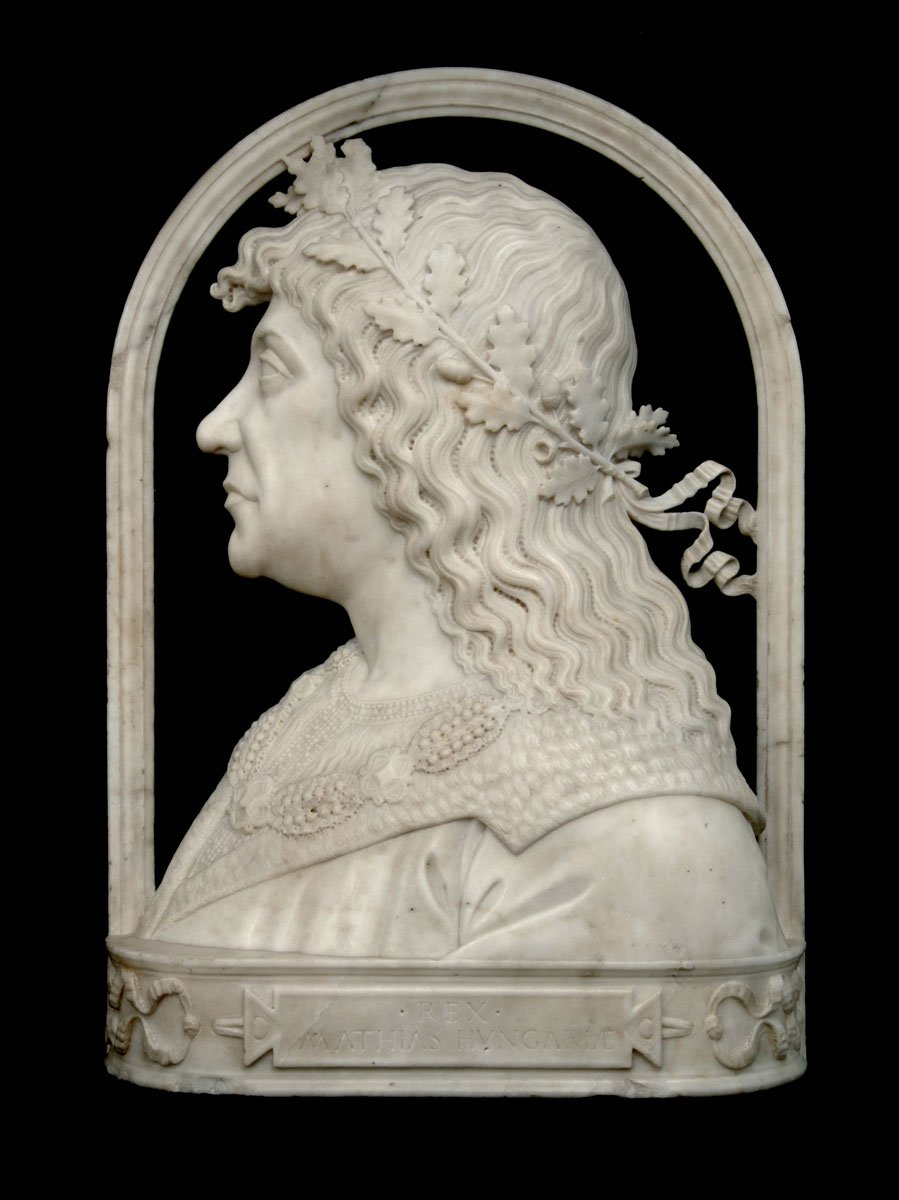
Renaissance portrait of Matthias Corvinus, King of Hungary, (marble relief by Giovanni Dalmata (attributed to), Benedetto da Maiano (previous attribution) 1476)

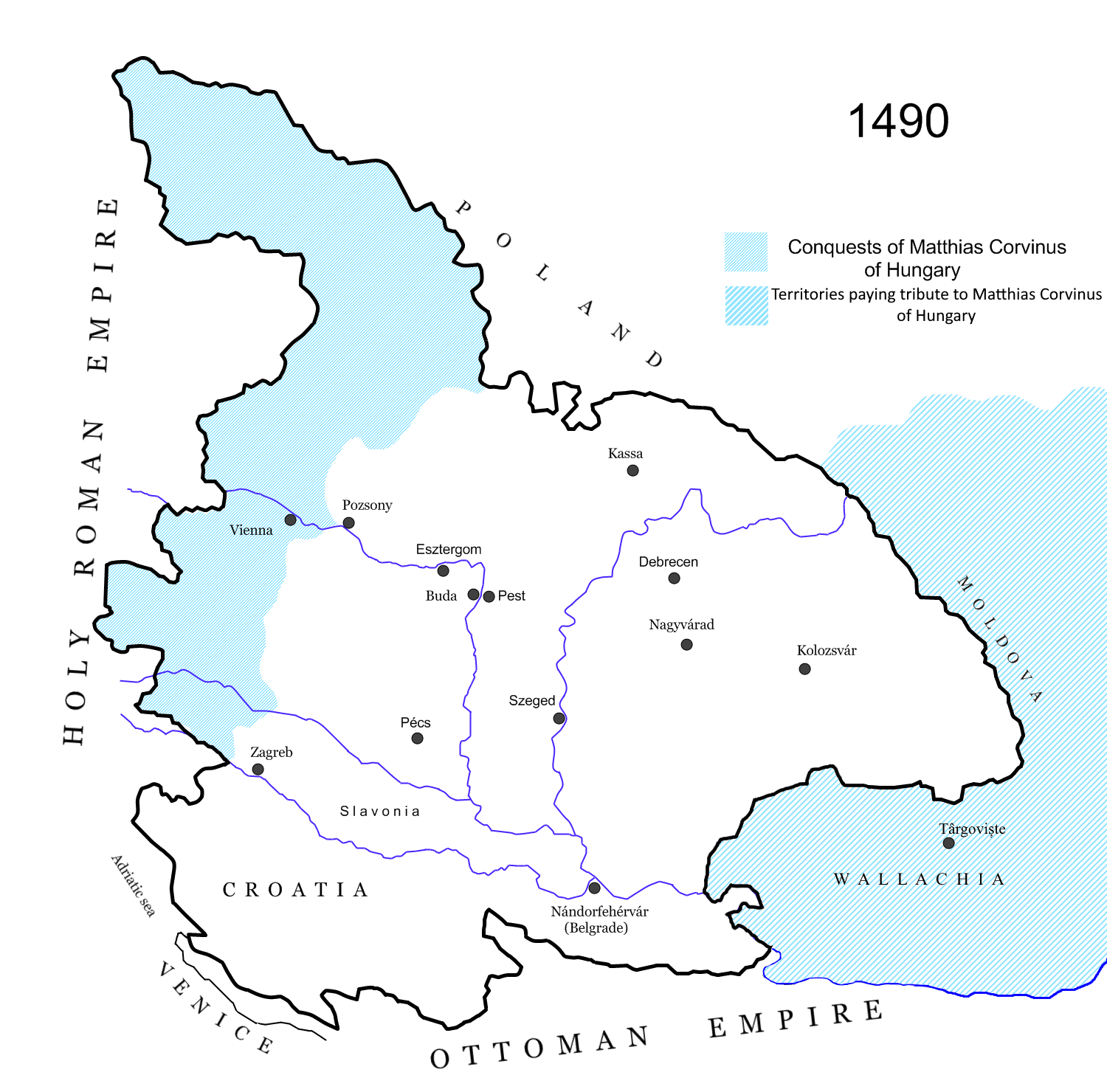
Western conquests of Matthias Corvinus

The Hungarian kingdom's golden age was during the reign of Matthias Corvinus (1458–1490), the son of John Hunyadi. His nickname was "Matthias the Just". He further improved the Hungarian economy and practised astute diplomacy in place of military action whenever possible. Matthias did undertake campaigning when necessary. From 1485 until his death, he occupied Vienna, aiming to limit the influence and meddling of the Holy Roman Empire in Hungary's affairs.

At the time of the initial Ottoman encroachment, the Hungarians successfully resisted conquest. John Hunyadi was leader of the Crusade of Varna, in which the Hungarians tried to expel the Turks from the Balkans. Initially, they were successful, but later at the Battle of Varna, the Ottomans won a decisive if Pyrrhic victory. Wladyslaw III was decapitated during this battle.

In 1456, John Hunyadi delivered a crushing defeat of the Ottomans at the Siege of Belgrade. The Noon Bell commemorates the fallen Christian warriors. In the 15th century, the Black Army of Hungary was a modern mercenary army, with the Hussars the most skilled troops of the Hungarian cavalry. In 1479, under the leadership of Pál Kinizsi, the Hungarian army destroyed the Ottoman and Wallachian troops at the Battle of Breadfield. The army of Hungary destroyed its enemies almost every time when Matthias was king.

Matthias died without legitimate heir, and was thus succeeded by Vladislaus II Jagiellon (1490–1516), the son of Casimir IV of Poland. In turn, Vladislaus was succeeded by his son Louis II (1516–26).

In 1526, at the Battle of Mohács, the forces of the Ottoman Empire led by Suleiman the Magnificent annihilated the Hungarian army. In trying to escape, Louis II drowned in the Csele Creek. The leader of the Hungarian army, Pál Tomori, also died in the battle.

=== Early modern history ===
==== The divided kingdom ====
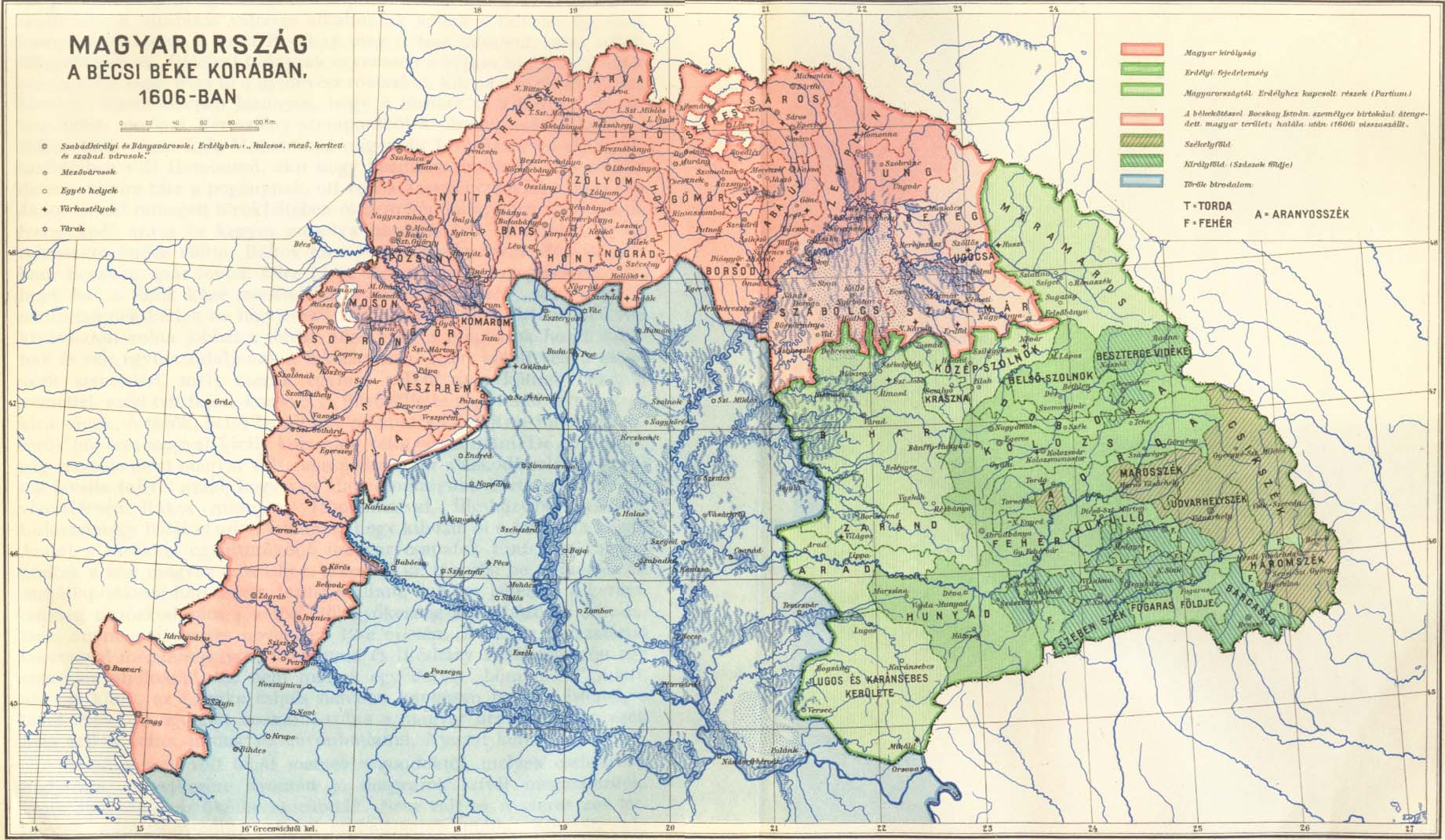
Royal Hungary, the Principality of Transylvania and Ottoman eyalets in 1606

Due to a serious defeat by the Ottomans (Battle of Mohács), the central authority collapsed. The majority of Hungary's ruling elite elected John Zápolya (10 November 1526). A small minority of aristocrats sided with Ferdinand I, Holy Roman Emperor, who was Archduke of Austria, and was related to Louis by marriage. Due to previous agreements that the Habsburgs would take the Hungarian throne if Louis died without heirs, Ferdinand was elected king by a rump diet in December 1526.

Although the borders shifted frequently during this period, the three parts can be identified, more or less, as follows:

- Royal Hungary, which consisted of northern and western territories where Ferdinand I was recognized as king of Hungary. This part is viewed as defining the continuity of the Kingdom of Hungary. The territory along with Ottoman Hungary suffered greatly from the nearly constant wars taking place.
- Ottoman Hungary: The Great Alföld (i.e. most of present-day Hungary, including south-eastern Transdanubia and the Banat), partly without north-eastern present-day Hungary.
- Eastern Hungarian Kingdom under the Szapolyai. This territory, often under Ottoman influence, was different from Transylvania proper and included various other territories sometimes referred to as Partium. Later the entity was called Principality of Transylvania.

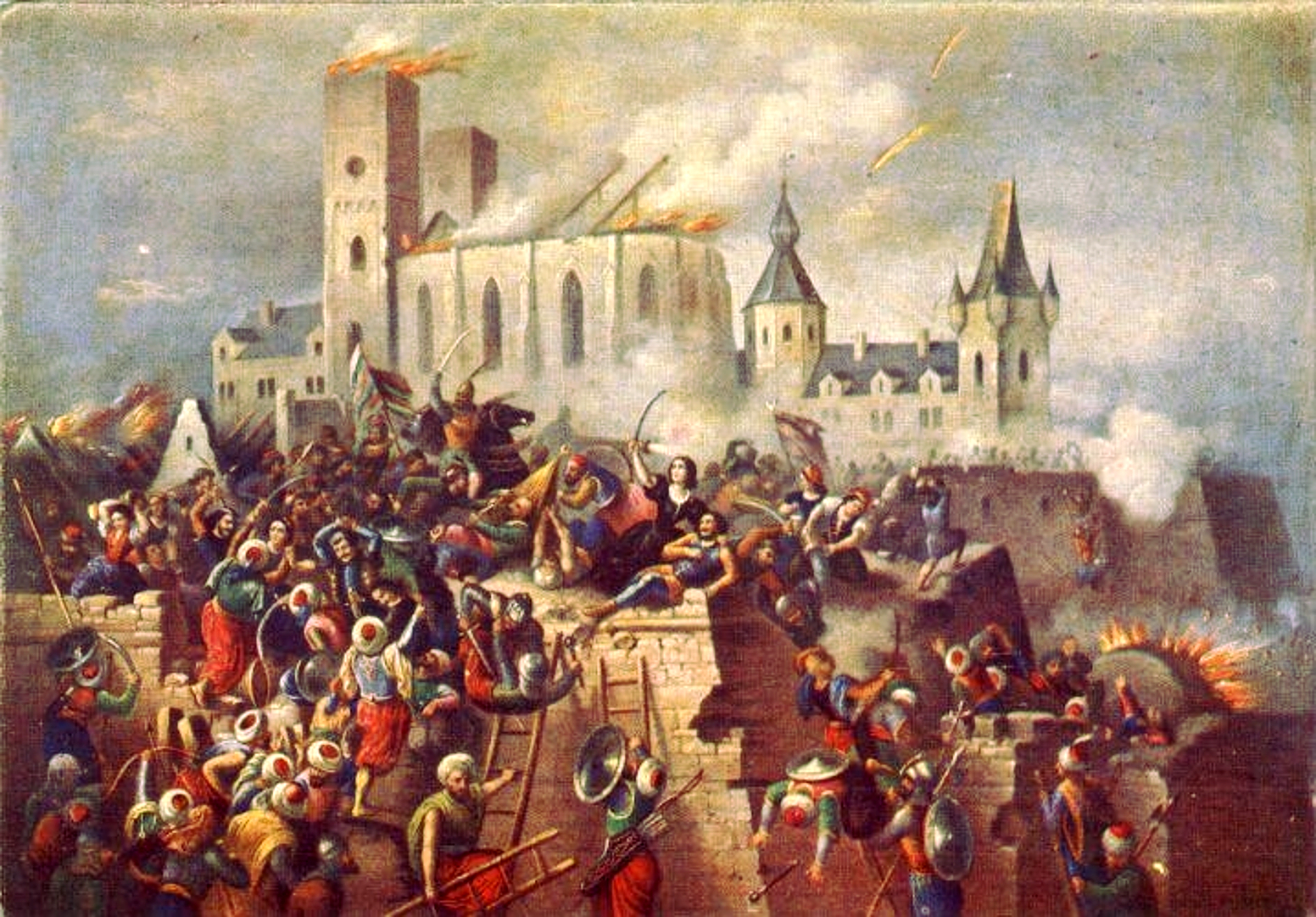
Siege of Eger Castle in 1552

On 29 February 1528, King John I of Hungary received the support of the Ottoman Sultan. A three-sided conflict ensued as Ferdinand moved to assert his rule over as much of the Hungarian kingdom as he could. By 1529 the kingdom had been split into two parts: Habsburg Hungary and the "eastern-Kingdom of Hungary". At this time there were no Ottomans on Hungarian territories, except Srem's important castles. In 1532, Nikola Jurišić defended Kőszeg and stopped a powerful Ottoman army. By 1541, the fall of Buda marked a further division of Hungary into three areas. The country remained divided until the end of the 17th century.

In 1547, the Truce of Adrianople was signed between Charles V and Suleiman the Magnificent. Through this treaty, Ferdinand I of Austria and Charles V recognized total Ottoman control of Hungary, and agreed to pay to the Ottomans a yearly tribute of 30,000 gold florins for their Habsburg possessions in northern and western Hungary.

On 1 May 1566, Suleiman I led an Ottoman invasion of Habsburg-controlled Hungary, the Ottoman forces of which was one of the most sizable armies he had led in his rule of 46 years. After reaching Belgrade and met with John II Sigismund Zápolya on 27 June, Suleiman I learned that a Croatian-Hungarian nobleman, Nikola IV Zrinski, Ban of Croatia, accomplished an attack on an Ottoman military camp at Siklós. Suleiman I held off his attack of Eger for the time being, and began to set off towards Nikola IV Zrinski's fortress at Szigetvár. From 2 August to 7 September, the Ottoman forces had laid siege to the fortress with a force, at the least, of 150,000 against Zrinski's 2,300 defenders. While the siege turned into a victory for the Ottomans, it came at the cost of: 25,000 Ottoman soldiers and Suleiman I, who before the final battle of Szigetvár, due to natural causes of old age and illness.

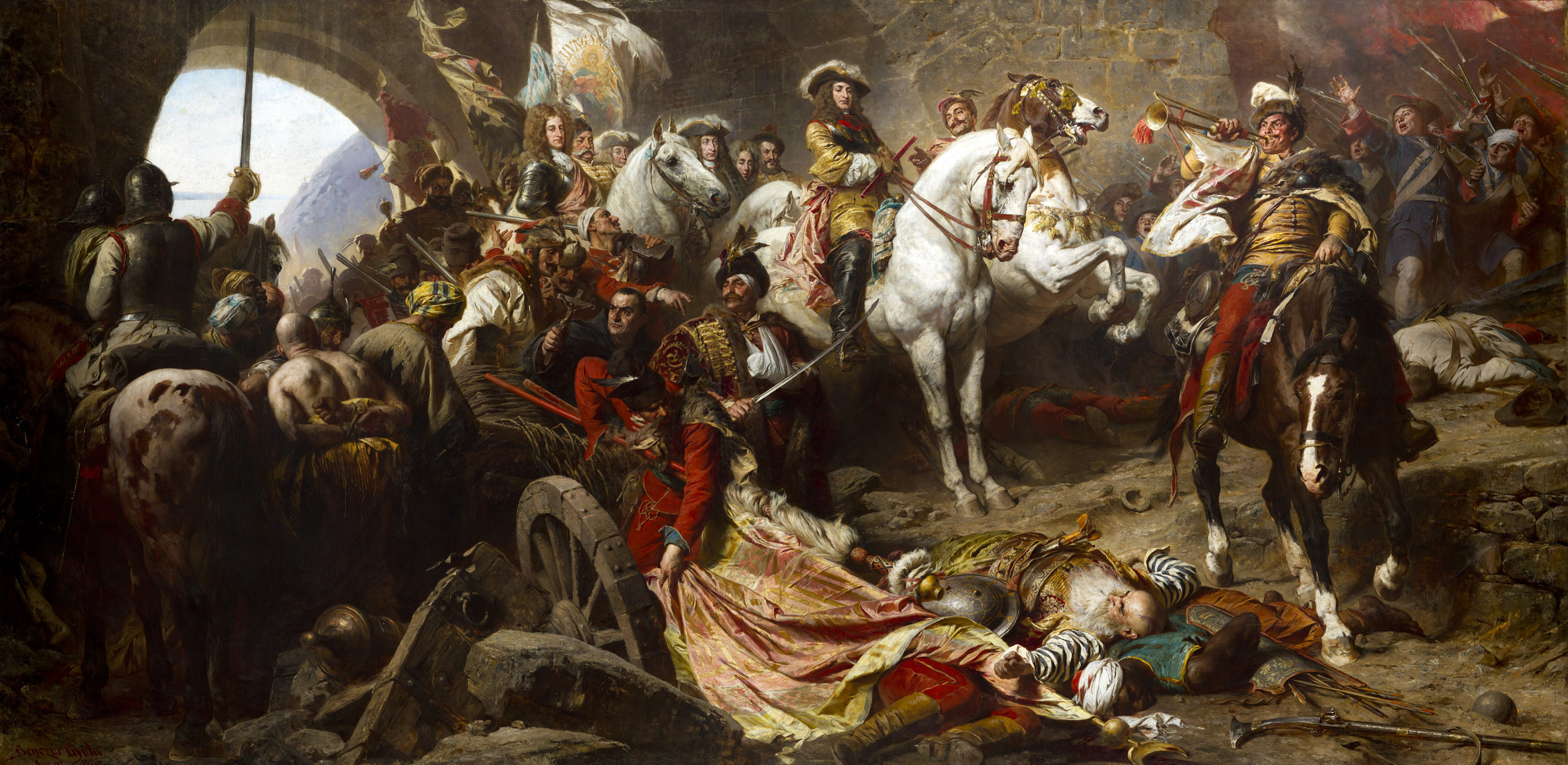
The Siege of Buda (1686): Hungarians and the Holy League (1684) reconquering Buda

In the following centuries there were numerous attempts to push back the Ottoman forces, such as the Long War or Thirteen Years' War (29 July 1593 – 1604/11 November 1606) led by a coalition of Christian forces. In 1644 the Winter Campaign by Miklós Zrínyi burnt the crucial Suleiman Bridge of Osijek in eastern Slavonia, interrupting a Turkish supply line in Hungary. At the Battle of Saint Gotthard (1664), Austrians and Hungarians defeated the Turkish army.

After the Ottoman siege of Vienna failed in 1683, the Habsburgs went on the offensive against the Turks. By the end of the 17th century, they managed to invade the remainder of the historical Kingdom of Hungary and the principality of Transylvania. For a while in 1686, the capital Buda was again free from the Ottoman Empire, with the aid of other Europeans.

==== The Kuruc age ====
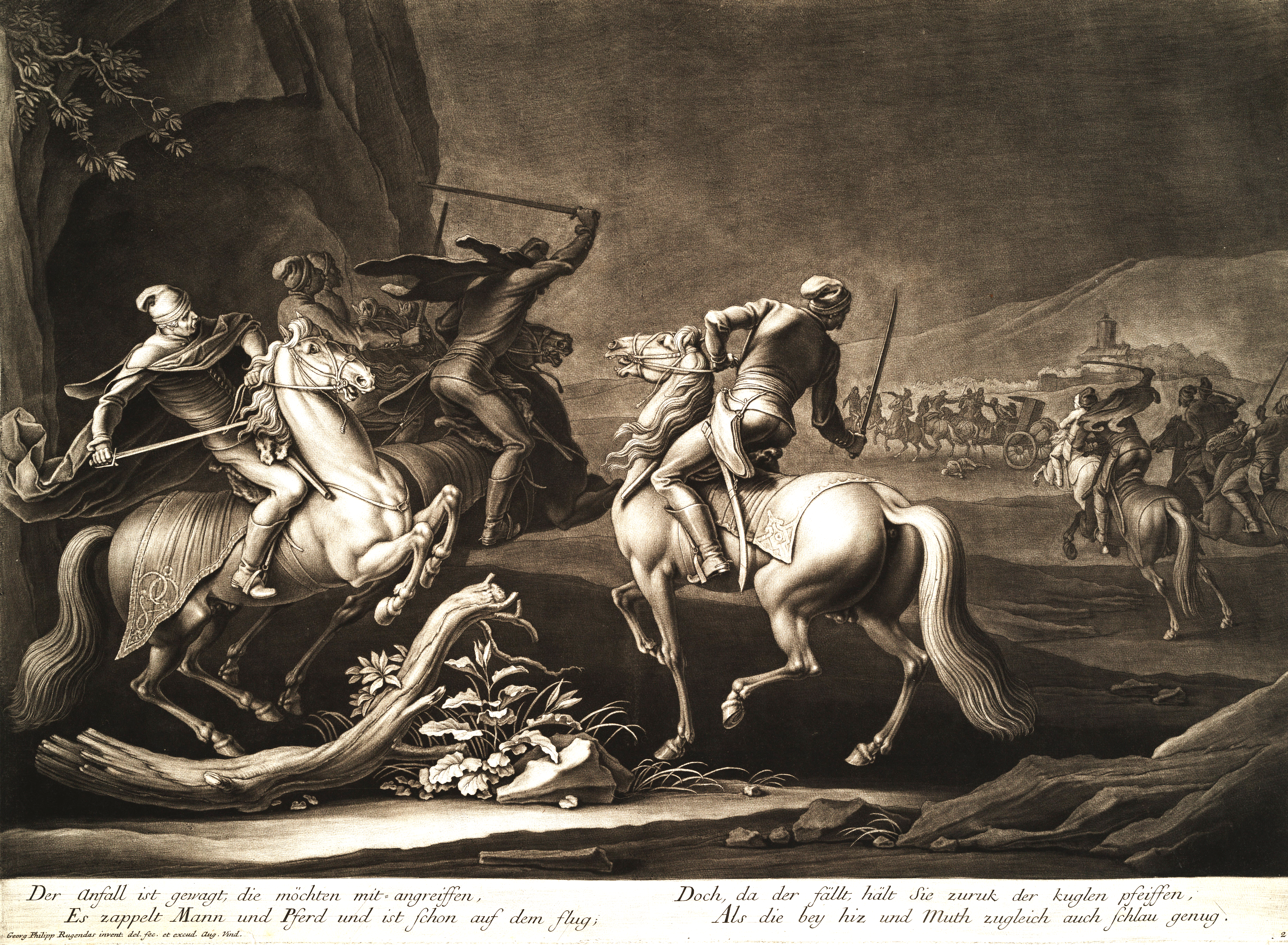
The Battle of Kuruc-Labanc, kuruc preparing to attack traveling coach and riders, c. 1705

Counties of the Kingdom of Hungary proper and Kingdom of Croatia-Slavonia around 1880

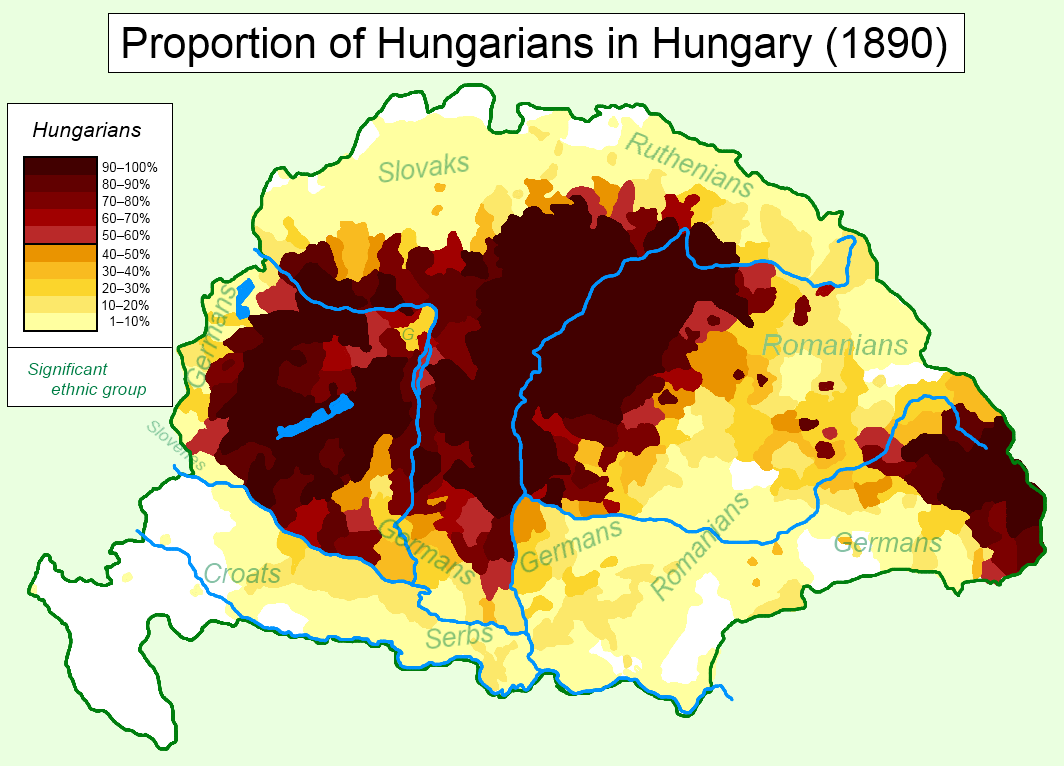
Distribution of Hungarians in the Kingdom of Hungary and the Kingdom of Croatia-Slavonia (1890)

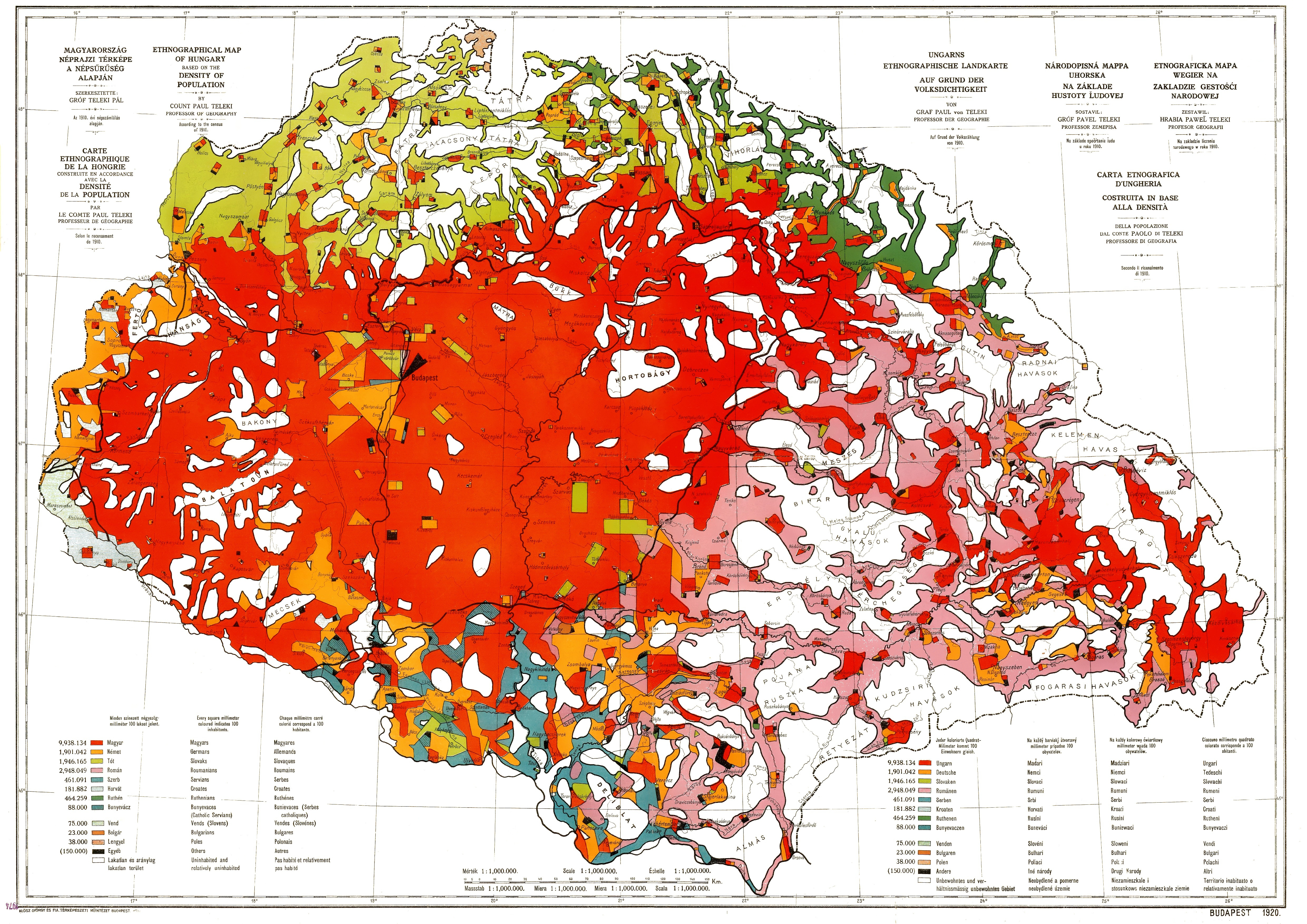
Ethnic map of the Hungary proper publicized by the Hungarian Trianon delegation. Regions with population density below 20 persons/km^{2} are left blank and the corresponding population is represented in the nearest region with population density above that limit. Hungarians Germans Slovaks Ruthenians Romanians Serbs Croats Spaces with a smaller density than 20 persons/sq km

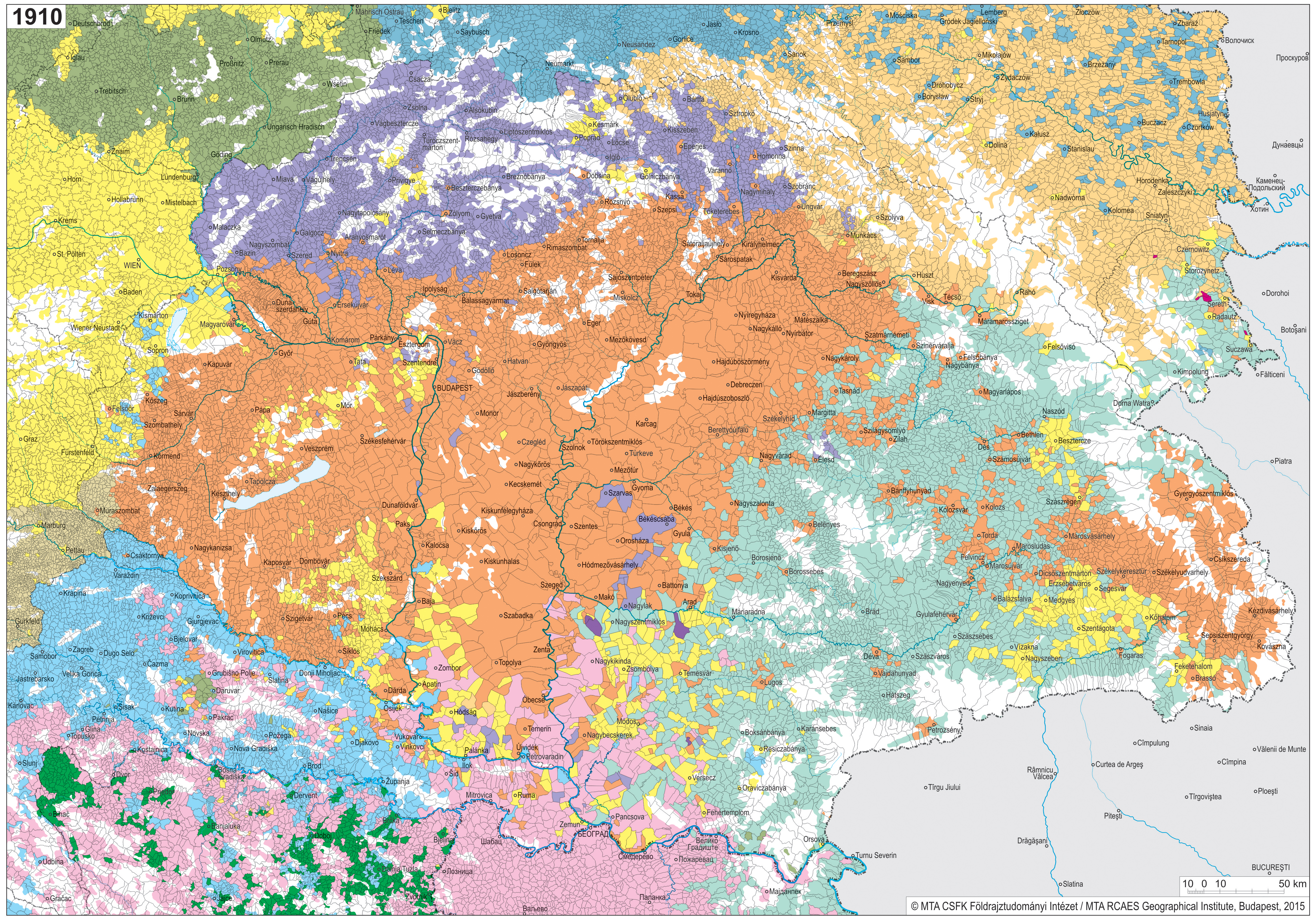
Ethnic map of the Kingdom of Hungary in 1910, based on the 1910 Hungarian census.

Rákóczi's War for Independence (1703–1711) was the first significant freedom fight in Hungary against absolutist Habsburg rule. It was fought by a group of noblemen, wealthy and high-ranking progressives who wanted to put an end to the inequality of power relations, led by Francis II Rákóczi (II. Rákóczi Ferenc in Hungarian). Its main aims were to protect the rights of the different social orders, and to ensure the economic and social development of the country. Due to the adverse balance of forces, the political situation in Europe and internal conflicts the freedom fight was eventually suppressed, but it succeeded in keeping Hungary from becoming an integral part of the Habsburg Empire, and its constitution was kept, even though it was only a formality.

After the departure of the Ottomans, the Habsburgs dominated the Hungarian Kingdom. The Hungarians' renewed desire for freedom led to Rákóczi's War for Independence. The most important reasons of the war were the new and higher taxes and a renewed Protestant movement. Rákóczi was a Hungarian nobleman, son of the legendary heroine Ilona Zrínyi. He spent a part of his youth in Austrian captivity. The Kurucs were troops of Rákóczi. Initially, the Kuruc army attained several important victories due to their superior light cavalry. Their weapons were mostly pistols, light sabre and fokos. At the Battle of Saint Gotthard (1705), János Bottyán decisively defeated the Austrian army. The Hungarian colonel Ádám Balogh nearly captured Joseph I, the King of Hungary and Archduke of Austria.

In 1708, the Habsburgs finally defeated the main Hungarian army at Battle of Trencsén, and this diminished the further effectiveness of the Kuruc army. While the Hungarians were exhausted by the fights, the Austrians defeated the French army in the War of the Spanish Succession. They could send more troops to Hungary against the rebels. Transylvania became part of Hungary again starting at the end of the 17th century, and was led by governors.

==== Age of Enlightenment ====
In 1711, Austrian Emperor Charles VI became the next ruler of Hungary. Throughout the 18th century, the Kingdom of Hungary had its own diet (parliament) and constitution, but the members of the Governor's Council (Helytartótanács, the office of the palatine) were appointed by the Habsburg monarch, and the superior economic institution, the Hungarian Chamber, was directly subordinated to the Court Chamber in Vienna.

The Hungarian language reform started under the reign of Joseph II. The reform age of Hungary was started by István Széchenyi a Hungarian noble, who built one of the greatest bridges of Hungary, the Széchenyi Chain Bridge. The official language remained Latin until 1836, when Hungarian was introduced. Between 1844 and 1849, and from 1867 onward, Hungarian became the exclusively used official language.

==== Hungarian Revolution of 1848 ====
The European revolutions of 1848 swept into Hungary, as well. The Hungarian Revolution of 1848 sought to redress the long suppressed desire for political change, namely independence. The Hungarian National Guard was created by young Hungarian patriots in 1848. In literature, this was best expressed by the greatest poet of the revolution, Sándor Petőfi.

As war broke out with Austria, Hungarian military successes, which included the campaigns of the Hungarian general, Artúr Görgey, forced the Austrians on the defensive. One of the most famous battles of the revolution, the Battle of Pákozd, was fought on 29 September 1848, when the Hungarian revolutionary army led by Lieutenant-General János Móga defeated the troops of the Croatian Ban Josip Jelačić. Fearing defeat, the Austrians pleaded for Russian help. The combined forces of the two empires quelled the revolution. The desired political changes of 1848 were again suppressed until the Austro-Hungarian Compromise of 1867.

Population 1910 (Kingdom of Hungary without Kingdom of Croatia-Slavonia)

Ethnicity	Number	Percentage
Hungarian	9 944 627	54.44%
Romanian	2 948 186	16.14%
Slovak	1 946 357	10.65%
German	1 903 357	10.42%
Ruthenian	464 270	2.54%
Serbian	461 516	2.52%
Croatian	194 808	1.06%
Other	401 412	2.19%
All	18 264 533	100%

Population 1910 (Lands of the Crown of Saint Stephen)

Spoken languages in Transleithania (Hungary) (1910 census)
Land	Hungarian	Romanian	German	Slovak	Croatian	Serbian	Ruthenian	Other	Total
Danube Right Bank	72% (2,221,295)	0% (833)	18% (555,694)	0.6% (17,188)	5.5% (168,436)	0.5% (15,170)	0% (232)	3.4% (105,556)	14.8% (3,084,404)
Danube Left Bank	32.7% (711,654)	0% (704)	6.6% (144,395)	58.8% (1,279,574)	0.1% (2,294)	0% (200)	0% (393)	1.7% (36,710)	10.4% (2,175,924)
Danube-Tisza	81.2% (3,061,066)	0.1% (4,813)	9.5% (357,822)	2.1% (79,354)	0.1% (4,866)	4.1% (154,298)	0.3% (11,121)	4.1% (96,318)	18% (3,769,658)
Tisza Right Bank	53.5% (945,990)	0.1% (1,910)	5.6% (98,564)	25% (441,776)	0% (486)	0% (247)	14.3% (253,062)	1.6% (27,646)	8.5% (1,769,681)
Tisza Left Bank	61.8% (1,603,924)	24% (621,918)	3.2% (83,229)	3.1% (81,154)	0% (327)	0% (321)	7.5% (194,504)	0.3% (8,547)	12.4% (2,594,924)
Tisza-Maros	22.2% (474,988)	39.5% (845,850)	19.9% (427,253)	2.1% (44,715)	0.2% (4,950)	13.6% (290,434)	0.1% (3,188)	2.4% (50,391)	10.3% (2,141,769)
Transylvania	34.3% (918,217)	55% (1,472,021)	8.7% (234,085)	0.1% (2,404)	0% (523)	0% (421)	0.1% (1,759)	1.8% (48,937)	12.8% (2,678,367)
Fiume	13% (6,493)	0.3% (137)	4.6% (2,315)	0.4% (192)	26% (12,926)	0.9% (425)	0% (11)	54.8 (27,307, mostly Italian)	0.2% (49,806)
Croatia-Slavonia	4% (105,948)	0% (846)	5.1% (134,078)	0.8% (21,613)	62.5% (1,638,354)	24.6% (644,955)	0.3% (8,317)	2.6% (67,843)	12.6% (2,621,954)
Total	48.1% (10,050,575)	14.1% (2,949,032)	9.8% (2,037,435)	9.4% (1,967,970)	8.8% (1,833,162)	5.3% (1,106,471)	2.3% (472,587)	2.2% (469,255)	100% (20,886,487)

=== Austria-Hungary (1867–1918) ===
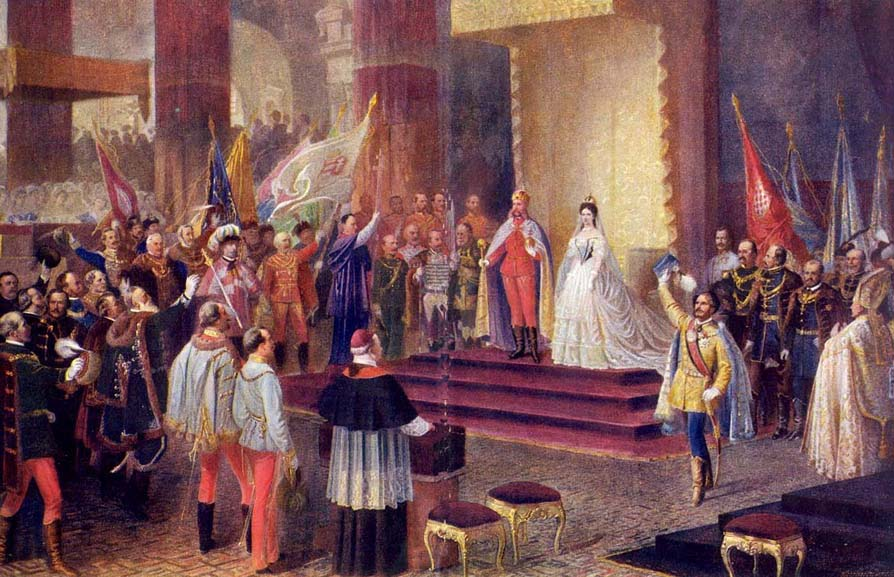
Coronation of Francis Joseph I and Elisabeth at Matthias Church, Buda, 8 June 1867

Following the Austro-Hungarian Compromise of 1867, the Habsburg Monarchy became the "dual monarchy" of Austria-Hungary. The Austro-Hungarian economy changed dramatically during the existence of the Dual Monarchy. Technological change accelerated industrialization and urbanization. The capitalist way of production spread throughout the Empire during its fifty-year existence and obsolete medieval institutions continued to disappear. By the early 20th century, most of the Empire began to experience rapid economic growth. The GNP per capita grew roughly 1.45% per year from 1870 to 1913. That level of growth compared very favorably to that of other European nations such as Britain (1.00%), France (1.06%), and Germany (1.51%).

The lands of the Hungarian Crown (comprising the Kingdom of Hungary proper, into which Transylvania was fully incorporated, and the Kingdom of Croatia-Slavonia, which maintained a distinct identity and internal autonomy) were granted equal status with the Austrian Empire. Each of the two states comprising Austria-Hungary exercised considerable independence, with certain institutions, notably the reigning house, defence, foreign affairs, and finances for common expenditures, remaining under joint management. This arrangement lasted until 1918, when the Central Powers went down in defeat in World War I.

=== Transitions (1918 to 1920) ===
==== Two short-lived republics ====
The Hungarian Soviet Republic or Hungarian Republic of Councils (Hungarian: Magyarországi Tanácsköztársaság or Magyarországi Szocialista Szövetséges Tanácsköztársaság) was a short-lived independent communist state established in Hungary.

It lasted only from 21 March until 1 August 1919. The state was led by Béla Kun and was not recognized by France, the UK or the US. It was the second socialist state in the world to be formed after the October Revolution in Russia brought the Bolsheviks to power. The Hungarian Republic of Councils had military conflicts with the Kingdom of Romania (see Hungarian–Romanian War), the Kingdom of Serbs, Croats and Slovenes and the evolving Czechoslovakia. It collapsed on 1 August 1919 when Hungarians sent representatives to negotiate their surrender to the Romanian forces and Béla Kun, together with other high-ranking Communists, fled to Austria.

A 1919 attempt to form a federation with the Kingdom of Romania also failed, when the Romanian King ultimately refused to accept the Hungarian Crown.

==== The restoration of the Kingdom ====
After the pullout of occupation forces of Romania in 1920 the country went into civil conflict, with Hungarian anti-communists and monarchists purging the nation of communists and others by whom they felt threatened. On 29 February 1920, after the pullout of the last of the Romanian occupation forces, the Kingdom of Hungary was restored, a coalition of right-wing political forces united and reinstated Hungary's status as a constitutional monarchy. Selection of the new King was delayed due to civil infighting, and a regent was appointed to represent the monarchy, former Austro-Hungarian navy admiral Miklós Horthy.

==== Treaty of Trianon (1920) ====
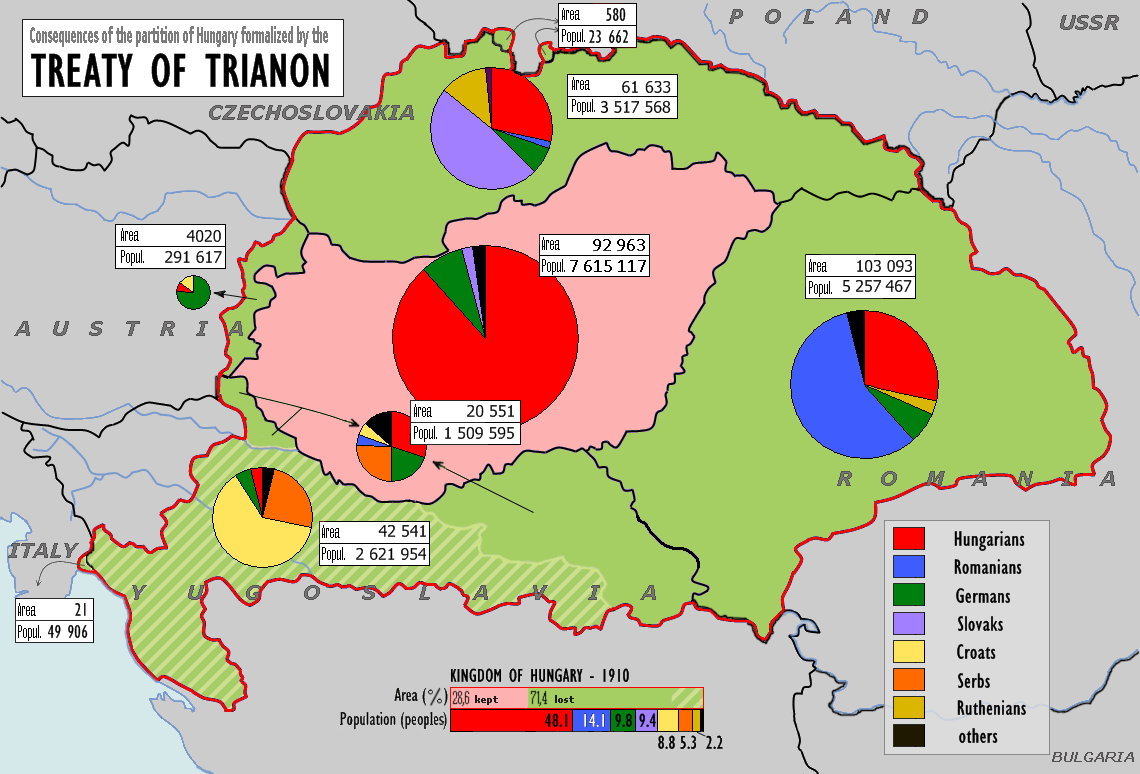
The Treaty of Trianon: Hungary lost 72% of its territory, its sea access, half of its 10 biggest cities and all of its precious metal mines; 3,425,000 ethnic Hungarians found themselves separated from their motherland.

The new borders set in 1920 by the Treaty of Trianon ceded 72% of the territory of the Kingdom of Hungary to the neighbouring states. The main beneficiaries were Romania, the newly formed states of Czechoslovakia, and the Kingdom of Serbs, Croats and Slovenes, but Austria, Poland and Italy also gained smaller territories. The areas that were allocated to neighbouring countries in total (and each of them separately) possessed a majority of non-Hungarian population, but more than 3.3 million ethnic Hungarians were left outside the new borders of Hungary. Many view this as contrary to the terms laid out by US President Woodrow Wilson's Fourteen Points, which were intended to honour the ethnic makeup of the territories. As President Wilson left the conference to emphasize his disagreement, and because the US Congress did not ratify the treaty, the United States of America and the Kingdom of Hungary signed a separate peace treaty on 29 August 1921.

=== Between 1920 and 1946 ===
==== Interwar period ====
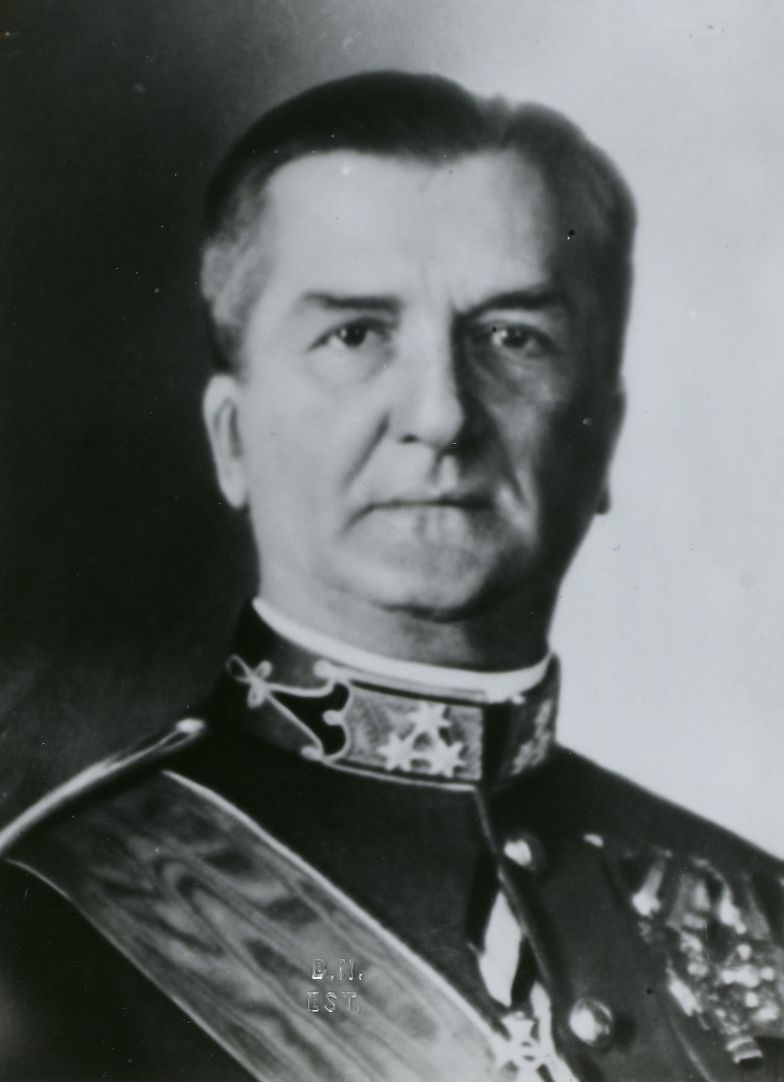
Miklós Horthy was regent of Hungary from 1920 to 1944

The new international borders separated Hungary's industrial base from its sources of raw materials and its former markets for agricultural and industrial products. Hungary lost 84% of its timber resources, 43% of its arable land, and 83% of its iron ore. Furthermore, post-Trianon Hungary possessed 90% of the engineering and printing industry of the Kingdom, while only 11% of timber and 16% iron was retained. In addition, 61% of arable land, 74% of public road, 65% of canals, 62% of railroads, 64% of hard surface roads, 83% of pig iron output, 55% of industrial plants, 100% of gold, silver, copper, mercury and salt mines, and 67% of credit and banking institutions of the prewar Kingdom of Hungary lay within the territory of Hungary's neighbors.

Because most of the country's pre-war industry was concentrated near Budapest, Hungary retained about 51% of its industrial population and 56% of its industry. Horthy appointed Count Pál Teleki as Prime Minister in July 1920. His government issued a numerus clausus law, limiting admission of "political insecure elements" (these were often Jews) to universities and, in order to quiet rural discontent, took initial steps towards fulfilling a promise of major land reform by dividing about 3,850 km^{2} from the largest estates into smallholdings. Teleki's government resigned, however, after Charles IV unsuccessfully attempted to retake Hungary's throne in March 1921. The return of King Charles produced split parties between conservatives who favored a Habsburg restoration and nationalist right-wing radicals who supported election of a Hungarian king. Count István Bethlen, a non-affiliated right-wing member of the parliament, took advantage of this rift forming a new Party of Unity under his leadership. Horthy then appointed Bethlen prime minister. Charles IV died soon after he failed a second time to reclaim the throne in October 1921. (For more detail, see Charles IV of Hungary's attempts to retake the throne.)

As prime minister, Bethlen dominated Hungarian politics between 1921 and 1931. He fashioned a political machine by amending the electoral law, providing jobs in the expanding bureaucracy to his supporters, and manipulating elections in rural areas. Bethlen restored order to the country by giving the radical counterrevolutionaries payoffs and government jobs in exchange for ceasing their campaign of terror against Jews and leftists. In 1921, he made a deal with the Social Democrats and trade unions (called Bethlen-Peyer Pact), agreeing, among other things, to legalize their activities and free political prisoners in return for their pledge to refrain from spreading anti-Hungarian propaganda, calling political strikes, and organizing the peasantry. Bethlen brought Hungary into the League of Nations in 1922 and out of international isolation by signing a treaty of friendship with Italy in 1927. The revision of the Treaty of Trianon rose to the top of Hungary's political agenda and the strategy employed by Bethlen consisted by strengthening the economy and building relations with stronger nations. Revision of the treaty had such a broad backing in Hungary that Bethlen used it, at least in part, to deflect criticism of his economic, social, and political policies.

The Great Depression induced a drop in the standard of living and the political mood of the country shifted further toward the right. In 1932 Horthy appointed a new prime-minister, Gyula Gömbös, who changed the course of Hungarian policy towards closer cooperation with Germany. Gömbös signed a trade agreement with Germany that drew Hungary's economy out of depression but made Hungary dependent on the German economy for both raw materials and markets. On 2 November 1938, as the result of the First Vienna Award parts of Czechoslovakia – Southern Slovakia and a part of Carpathian Ruthenia – were returned to Hungary, an area amounting to 11,927 km^{2} and a population of 869,299 (86.5% of which were Hungarians according to the 1941 census). Between 5 November and 10 November, Hungarian armed forces peacefully occupied the newly transferred territories. Hitler later promised to transfer all of Slovakia to Hungary in exchange for a military alliance, but his offer was rejected. Instead, Horthy chose to pursue a territorial revision to be decided along ethnic lines. In March 1939, the Czecho-Slovak Republic was dissolved, Germany invaded it, and the Protectorate of Bohemia and Moravia was established. On 14 March, Slovakia declared itself to be an independent state.

On 15 March, Carpatho-Ukraine declared itself to be an independent state. Hungary rejected the independence of Carpatho-Ukraine and, between 14 March and 18 March, Hungarian armed forces occupied the rest of Carpathian Ruthenia and ousted the government of Avgustyn Voloshyn. By contrast, Hungary recognized the Nazi puppet state of Slovakia led by the Clerical Fascist Jozef Tiso. In September 1940, with troops massing on both sides of the Hungarian-Romanian border, war was averted by the Second Vienna Award. This award transferred the northern half of Transylvania to Hungary, with a total area of 43,492 km^{2} and a total population of 2,578,100 with a 53.5% Hungarian majority according to the 1941 census. By dividing Transylvania between Romania and Hungary, Hitler was able to ease tensions in Hungary. In October 1940, the Germans initiated a reciprocity policy between Romania and Hungary which was continued until the end of World War II. The region of Sub-Carpathia was given special autonomous status with the intention that (eventually) it would be self-governed by the Ruthenian minority.

==== During World War II 1941–1945 ====
Map showing Hungary's territorial gains between 1938 and 1941

After being granted part of southern Czechoslovakia and Subcarpathia by the Germans and Italians in the First Vienna Award of 1938, and then northern Transylvania in the Second Vienna Award of 1940, Hungary participated in their first military maneuvers on the side of the Axis powers in 1941. Thus, the Hungarian army was part of the invasion of Yugoslavia, gaining some more territory and joining the Axis powers in the process. On 22 June 1941, Germany invaded the Soviet Union in Operation Barbarossa. Hungary joined the German effort and declared war on the Soviet Union on 26 June, and entered World War II on the side of the Axis. In late 1941, the Hungarian troops on the Eastern Front experienced success at the Battle of Uman. By 1943, after the Royal Hungarian Army suffered extremely heavy losses at the river Don, the Hungarian government sought to negotiate a surrender with the Allies. On 19 March 1944, as a result of this duplicity, German troops occupied Hungary in what was known as Operation Margarethe. By then it was clear that Hungarian politics would be suppressed according to Hitler's intention to hold the country in the war on the side of the Nazi Third Reich because of its strategic location. On 15 October 1944, Horthy made a token effort to disengage Hungary from the war. The Germans launched Operation Panzerfaust and Horthy's regime was replaced by a fascist puppet government under the pro-German Arrow Cross leader Ferenc Szálasi, thus effectively ending the possibility for independent actions in the war. However, the form of government was only changed to a republic two years later.

==== Transitioning into a republic ====
Following its occupation of Hungary in 1944, the Soviet Union imposed harsh conditions allowing the Soviets to seize important material assets and control internal affairs. After the Red Army set up police organs to persecute "class enemies", the Soviets assumed that the impoverished Hungarian populace would support the Communists in the coming elections. The Communists fared poorly, receiving only 17% of the vote, resulting in a coalition government under Prime Minister Zoltán Tildy. Soviet intervention, however, resulted in a government that disregarded Tildy, placed communists in important ministries, and imposed restrictive and repressive measures, including banning the victorious Independent Smallholders, Agrarian Workers and Civic Party. In 1945, Soviet Marshal Kliment Voroshilov forced the freely elected Hungarian government to yield the Interior Ministry to a nominee of the Hungarian Communist Party. Communist Interior Minister László Rajk established the ÁVH secret police, which suppressed political opposition through intimidation, false accusations, imprisonment and torture. In 1946 the form of government was changed to a republic. Soon after the monarchy was abolished, the Soviet Union pressed Hungarian leader Mátyás Rákosi to take a "line of more pronounced class struggle." What emerged was a communist state lasting until 23 October 1956 when the Soviet occupation was swept away by the Hungarian uprising, victorious until 10 November 1956. The Soviet occupation was then restored, lasting until 1989 when the Communists agreed to give up their monopoly on power, paving the way for free elections in March 1990. In today's republic, the Kingdom is regarded as one long stage in the development of the state. This sense of continuity is reflected in the republic's national symbols such as the Holy Crown of Hungary and the coat of arms of Hungary, which are the same as when the monarchy was still in place. Several holidays, the official language (Hungarian), and the capital city Budapest have also been retained. The official Hungarian name of the country is Magyarország (simply Hungary) since 2012; it was also the common name of the monarchy. The millennium of the Hungarian statehood was commemorated in 2000 and codified by the Millennium Act of 2000.

== See also ==
- Administrative divisions of the Kingdom of Hungary
- Comitatus (Kingdom of Hungary)
- Demographics of the Kingdom of Hungary
- List of Hungarian rulers
- Hungarian nobility
- Nobility in the Kingdom of Hungary

== Sources ==
- Wettig, Gerhard (2008), Stalin and the Cold War in Europe, Rowman & Littlefield, ISBN 978-0-7425-5542-6
