= Michael Kovats de Fabriczy =

Hungarian nobleman and cavalry officer

- Born: Kováts Mihály; 1724; Karcag, Habsburg monarchy
- Died: May 11, 1779 (aged 54–55); Charleston, South Carolina, U.S.
- Burial place: Charleston, South Carolina (Field of Battle)
- Spouse: Franciska Merse de Szinye
- Children: 1
- Military career
- Allegiance: Kingdom of Hungary; Kingdom of Prussia; United States of America
- Branch: (Kingdom of Hungary) Hungarian cavalry Prussian Army; Continental Army
- Rank: Colonel Commandant
- Unit: Pulaski's Legion
- Awards: Pour le Mérite

Michael Kovats de Fabriczy (often simply Michael Kovats; Hungarian: Kováts Mihály; 1724 – May 11, 1779) was a Hungarian nobleman and cavalry officer who served in the Continental Army during the American Revolutionary War, in which he was killed in action. General Casimir Pulaski and Kovats are together known as the "Founding Fathers of the US Cavalry".

== Early life ==
Kovats was born Michael Kovats de Keszi et Kaal (Hungarian: Keszi és Kaal Kováts Mihály) in Karcag, Hungary. In English historical records his family name is sometimes spelled "Kowatz" or "Kowatsch". He later assumed the toponymic 'de Fabriczy' (also spelled Fabriczi or Fabriczki in Hungarian and Fabricy in English).

A nobleman, he became an officer in the Hungarian cavalry under Maria Theresa. He later became captain in the Prussian Cavalry, serving under Frederick the Great and earning the highest distinction in the Prussian Army, the Pour le Mérite. He married Franciska, daughter of nobleman Sigismund Merse de Szinye (Szinye Merse Zsigmond), with whom he had one son, George (György). Their son died at a young age and the two later separated.

== Military career in America ==
In 1777, after learning about the American Revolution, he offered his sword to the American ambassador in France, Benjamin Franklin.

Upon his arrival in America, Kováts joined Casimir Pulaski, who was then brigadier general and commander-in-chief of Washington's cavalry. Pulaski's cavalry was poorly trained. The small number of trained cavalry officers available made the task of commanding the forces formidable. On February 4, 1778, Pulaski proposed a plan for the formation of a training division of hussars. In a letter to Washington, Pulaski wrote: "There is an officer now in this Country whose name is Kovach. I know him to have served with reputation in the Prussian service and assure Your Excellency that he is in every way equal to his undertaking." Later, in another letter to Washington dated March 19, Pulaski again recommended Kovats: "I would propose, for my subaltern, an experienced officer, by name Kowacz, formerly a Colonel and partisan in the Prussian service."

Pulaski's Legion was commissioned by the Continental Congress on March 28, 1778, and Michael Kováts was named colonel commandant of the legion on April 18, 1778. He was finally allowed to perform the task he had initially been intended: to organize and train hussar regiments for the American army. The recruiting of men began almost immediately, and by October 1778, the legion consisted of 330 officers and men. Kováts trained these men in the tradition of Hungarian hussars: in basic form, training and organization, they were similar to their European counterparts.

Casimir Pulaski and Kovats, often referred to as the co-founder of the U.S. cavalry, made great efforts to turn their cavalry into an effective force, and the improvement of the Legion's mounted arm drew high praise from the British.

In October, the legion was transferred to New Jersey and sent into battle with the British at Osborne Island on the 10th and Egg Harbor on the 14th. With winter's approach, the legion was ordered to Cole's Fort, where they spent the first part of the winter in training. On February 2, 1779, the army marched to South Carolina to join the forces of General Benjamin Lincoln. During the long march, smallpox took its toll: only 150 soldiers arrived in Charleston—more than half of the legion had died of disease along the way.

The Siege of Charleston was underway. The situation was critical, the population urged for surrender. Pulaski's legion arrived on May 8, 1779, and unsuccessfully attacked the British troops led by General Prevost on May 11. In the battle on May 11, 1779, in Charleston, South Carolina, Colonel Michael Kováts lost his life in the war for American independence. He was buried where he fell. His British opponent in the battle, Brigade Major Skelly, paid Pulaski's Legion the highest of compliments during the requiem, describing it as, "the best cavalry the rebels ever had."

== Legacy ==
A phrase from his letter to Franklin, "Most Faithful unto Death" (Fidelissimus ad Mortem) has since been taken as the motto of the American Hungarian Federation. On May 11, 1779, Colonel Kovats gave his life in the American War for Independence while leading the Continental Army cavalry he had trained in Hungarian hussar tactics against a British Siege of Charleston.

According to the latest research, the Pulaski banner, which symbolised the legion, was inspired by the colours of the Hungarian national flag (red, white and green) in use since the early 17th century and was created by the Moravian Lutheran Sisters according to the instructions of Michael Kovats in Bethlehem, Pennsylvania, in early 1778. The flag embedded cultural history elements reflecting the close Hungarian-Polish friendship, and interstate relations back to the centuries.

To this date, Michael de Kovats is celebrated by cadets at The Citadel Military College in Charleston, South Carolina, where part of the campus is named in his honor. The Hungarian Embassy in Washington, D.C., has a statue sculpted by Paul Takacs and executed by Attila Dienes.

The World War II Liberty Ship SS Michael de Kovats was named in his honor.

== See also ==
- Casimir Pulaski, along with Kovats, "the father of American cavalry"
- Tadeusz Kościuszko, Polish military engineer who played a key role in improving Continental Army defenses during the American Revolution
- Hungarian-Polish Friendship Day
- István Kováts
