= Hungarian cavalry =

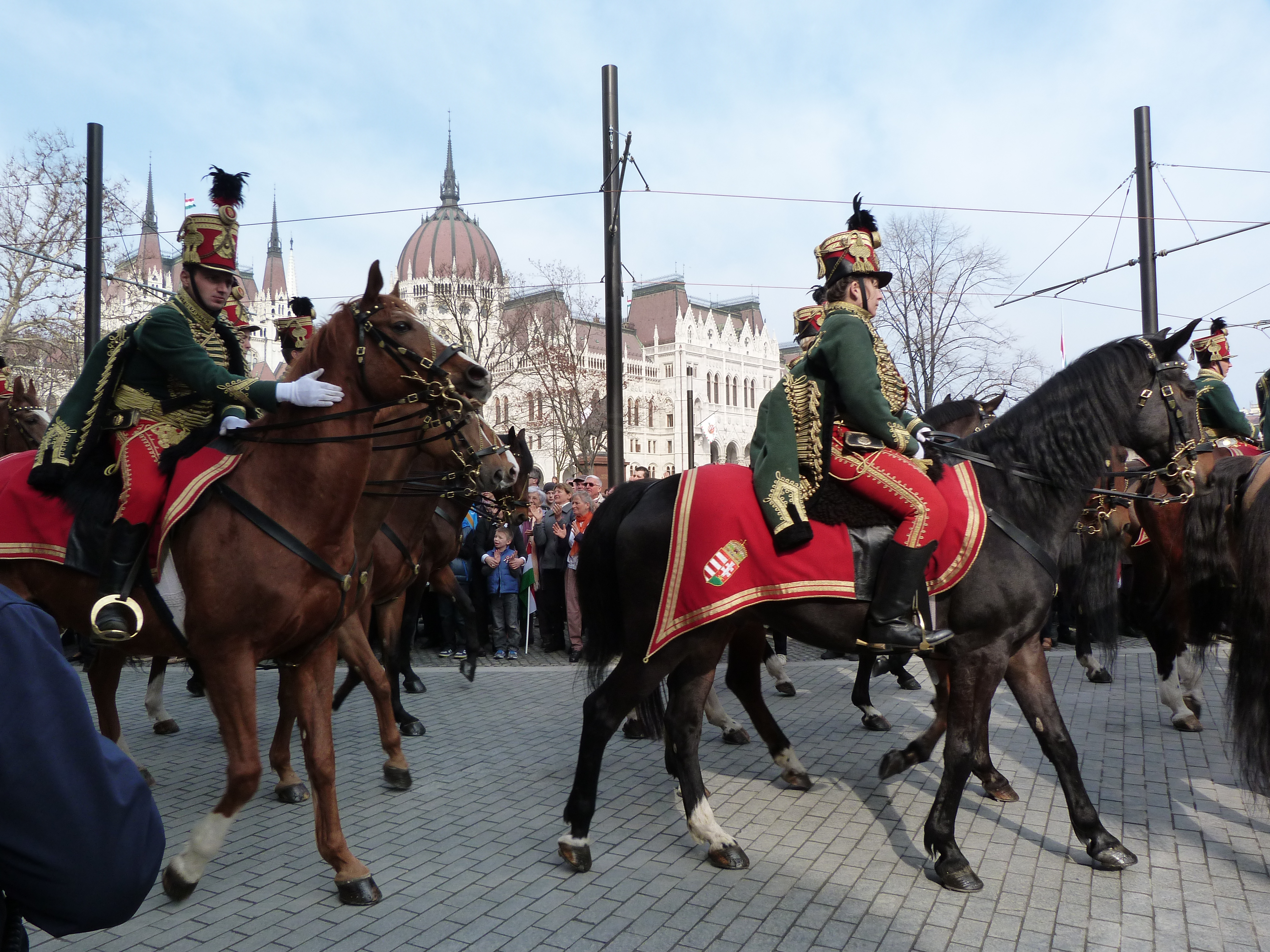
Modern hussars at the Houses of Parliament in Budapest

The Hungarian cavalry (Hungarian: Magyar Lovasság) was a Hungarian cavalry force.

== The hussars of medieval Hungary ==
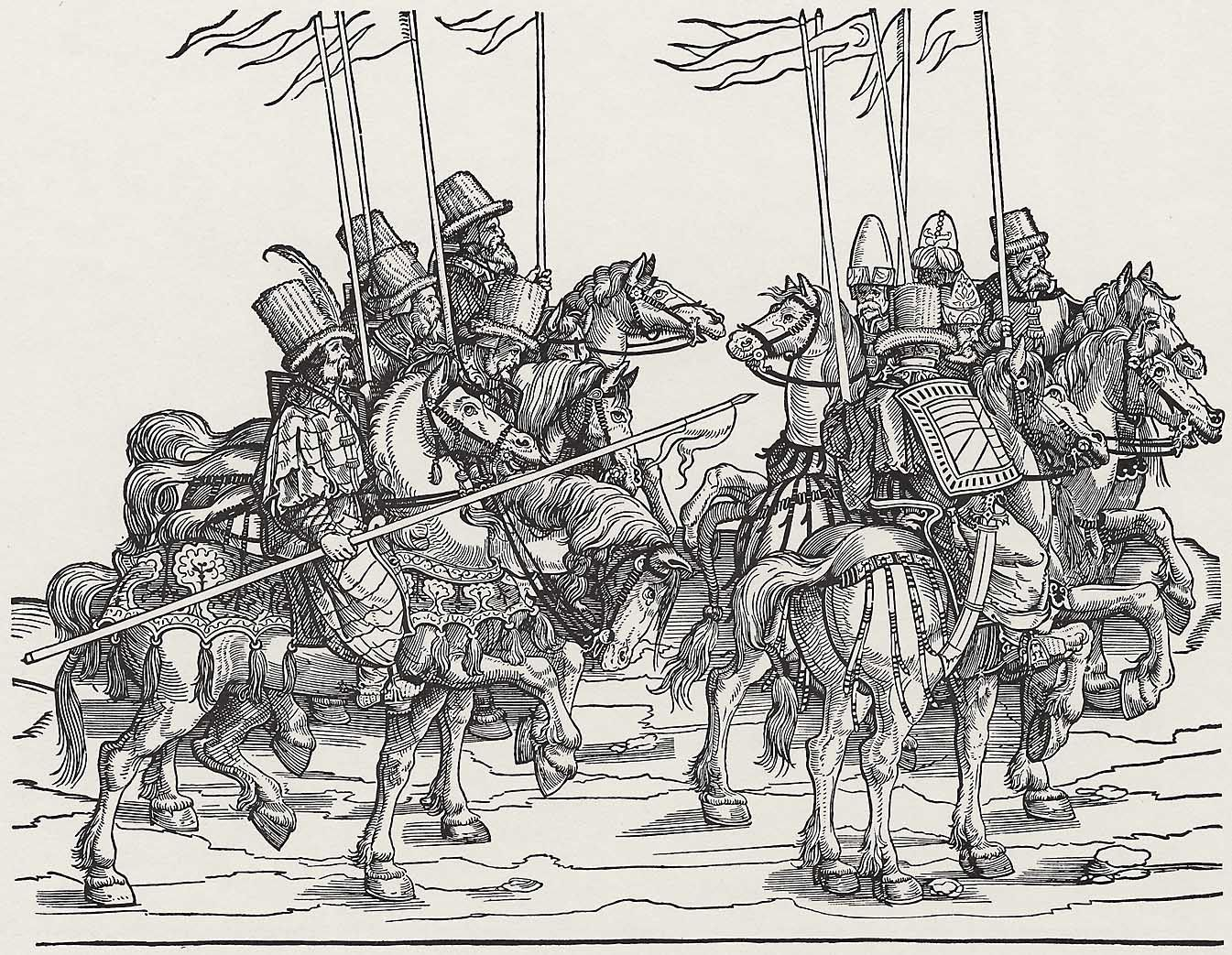
Hungarian lancers, 1530

A type of irregular light horsemen was already well established by the 15th century. The word hussar (/həˈzɑːr/ or /hʊˈzɑːr/; also spelling pronunciation /həˈsɑːr/) is from the Hungarian huszár. The word is derived from the Hungarian word of húsz meaning twenty, suggesting that hussar regiments were originally composed of twenty men. The hussars reportedly originated in bands of Serbian warriors crossing into southern Hungary after Turkish invasion on Serbia at the end of the 14th century. Initially they fought in small bands, but were reorganised into a larger, trained, formations during the reign of King Matthias I Corvinus of Hungary. So the first Hussar regiments were the light cavalry of the Black Army of Hungary. Under his command the hussars took part in the war against the Ottoman Empire in 1485 and proved successful against the Turkish Spahis as well as against Bohemians and Poles. After the king's death in 1490, hussars remained the preferred form of cavalry in Hungary. The Habsburg emperors hired Hungarian hussars as mercenaries to serve against the Ottoman Empire and on various battlefields throughout Europe.

== Hussars of Frederick the Great ==
During and after the Rákóczi's War for Independence, many Hungarians served in the Habsburg army. Located in garrisons far away from Hungary, some deserted from the Austrian army joining that of Prussia. The value of the Hungarian hussars as light cavalry was recognised and in 1721 two Hussaren Corps were organized in the Prussian Army.

Frederick II (later called "The Great") recognised the value of hussars as light cavalry and encouraged their recruitment. In 1741 he established a further five regiments, largely from Polish deserters. Three more regiments were raised for Prussian service in 1744 and another in 1758. While the hussars were increasingly drawn from Prussian and other German cavalrymen, they continued to wear the traditional Hungarian uniform, richly decorated with braid and gold trim.

Frederick also recognized the national characteristics of his Hungarian recruits and in 1759 issued a royal order which warned the Prussian officers never to offend the self-esteem of his hussars with insults and abuses. At the same time he exempted the hussars from the usual disciplinary measures of the Prussian Army: physical punishments including cudgeling.

Frederick used his hussars for reconnaissance duties and for surprise attacks against the enemy's flanks and rear. A hussar regiment under the command of Colonel Sigismund Dabasi-Halász won the battle at Striegau on May 4, 1745, by attacking the Austrian combat formation in its flank and capturing its entire artillery.

The effectiveness of the hussars in Frederick's army can be judged by the number of promotions and decorations awarded to their officers. Recipients included the Hungarian generals Pal Werner and Ferenc Kőszeghy, who received the highest Prussian military order, the "Pour le Merite"; General Tivadar Ruesh was awarded the title of baron; Mihály Székely was promoted from the rank of captain to general after less than fifteen years of service.

While Hungarian hussars served in the opposing armies of Frederick and Maria Theresa there were no known instances of fratricidal clashes between them.
