= Hurricane Sandy =

Category 3 Atlantic hurricane in 2012

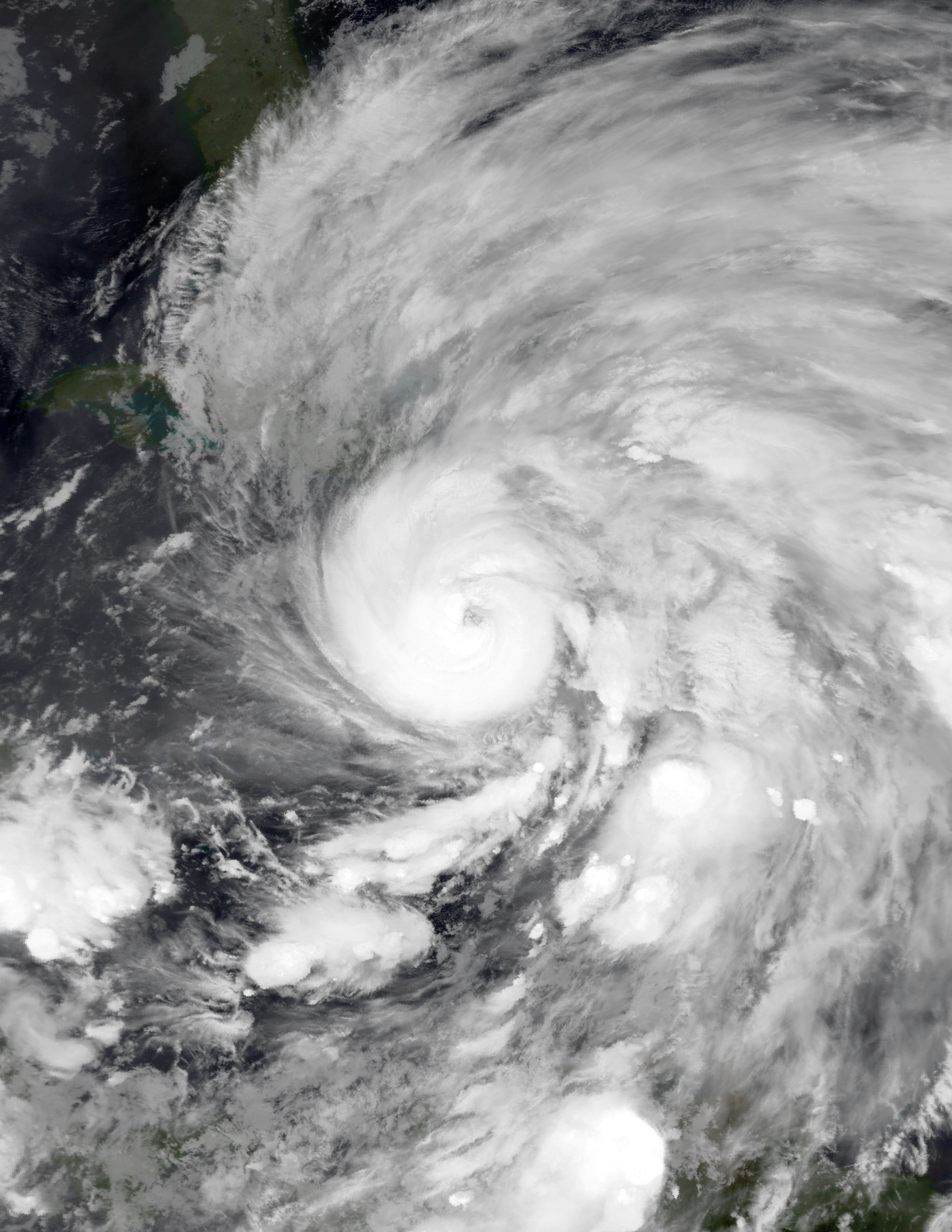
- Sandy at its initial peak intensity just before landfall in Cuba on October 25

Meteorological history
- Formed: October 22, 2012
- Post-tropical: October 29, 2012
- Dissipated: November 2, 2012

Category 3 major hurricane
- 1-minute sustained (SSHWS/NWS)
- Highest winds: 115 mph (185 km/h)
- Lowest pressure: 940 mbar (hPa); 27.76 inHg

Overall effects
- Fatalities: 254
- Damage: $68.7 billion (2012 USD) (Eighth-costliest tropical cyclone on record; seventh-costliest in U.S. history)
- Areas affected: Greater Antilles, the Bahamas, Eastern United States (especially the coastal Mid-Atlantic States), Bermuda, eastern Canada
- IBTrACS
- Part of the 2012 Atlantic hurricane and 2012–13 North American winter seasons
- History: Meteorological history; Effects: Greater Antilles; United States; Maryland and Washington, D.C.; New Jersey; New York; New England; Canada; Other wikis: Commons: Sandy images

Hurricane Sandy (unofficially referred to as Superstorm Sandy) was an extremely large and devastating tropical cyclone which ravaged the Caribbean and the coastal Mid-Atlantic region of the United States in late October 2012. It was the largest Atlantic hurricane on record as measured by diameter, with tropical-storm-force winds spanning 1,150 miles (1,850 km). The storm inflicted nearly US$70 billion in damage (equivalent to $98 billion in 2025), and killed 254 people in eight countries, from the Caribbean to Canada. The eighteenth named storm, tenth hurricane, and second major hurricane of the 2012 Atlantic hurricane season, Sandy was a Category 3 storm at its peak intensity when it made landfall in Cuba, though most of the damage it caused was after it became a Category 1–equivalent extratropical cyclone off the coast of the Northeastern United States.

Sandy developed from a tropical wave in the western Caribbean Sea on October 22, quickly strengthened, and was upgraded to Tropical Storm Sandy six hours later. Sandy moved slowly northward toward the Greater Antilles and gradually intensified. On October 24, Sandy became a hurricane, made landfall near Kingston, Jamaica, re-emerged a few hours later into the Caribbean Sea and strengthened into a Category 2 hurricane. On October 25, Sandy hit Cuba as a Category 3 hurricane, then weakened to a Category 1 hurricane. Early on October 26, Sandy moved through the Bahamas. On October 27, Sandy briefly weakened to a tropical storm and then strengthened back to a Category 1 hurricane. Early on October 29, Sandy curved west-northwest (the "left turn" or "left hook") and then moved ashore near Brigantine, New Jersey, just to the northeast of Atlantic City, as a post-tropical cyclone with hurricane-force winds. Sandy continued drifting inland for another few days while gradually weakening, until it was absorbed by another approaching extratropical storm on November 2.

In Jamaica, winds left 70% of residents without electricity, blew roofs off buildings, killed one person, and caused about $100 million (equivalent to $140 million in 2025) in damage. Sandy's outer bands brought flooding to Haiti, killing a total of 75 people, causing food shortages, and leaving about 200,000 homeless; the hurricane also caused two deaths in the Dominican Republic. In Puerto Rico, one man was swept away by a swollen river. In Cuba, there was extensive coastal flooding and wind damage inland, destroying some 15,000 homes, killing 11, and causing $2 billion (equivalent to $2.8 billion in 2025) in damage. Sandy caused two deaths and an estimated $700 million (equivalent to $982 million in 2025) in damage in the Bahamas.

In the United States, Hurricane Sandy affected 24 states, including the entire eastern seaboard from Florida to Maine and west across the Appalachian Mountains to Michigan and Wisconsin, with particularly severe damage in New Jersey and New York. Its storm surge hit New York City on October 29, flooding streets, tunnels and subway lines and cutting power in and around the city. Damage in the United States amounted to $65 billion (equivalent to $91 billion in 2025). In Canada, two were killed in Ontario, and the storm caused an estimated C$100 million (equivalent to C$135 million in 2025) in damage throughout Ontario and Quebec.

== Meteorological history ==
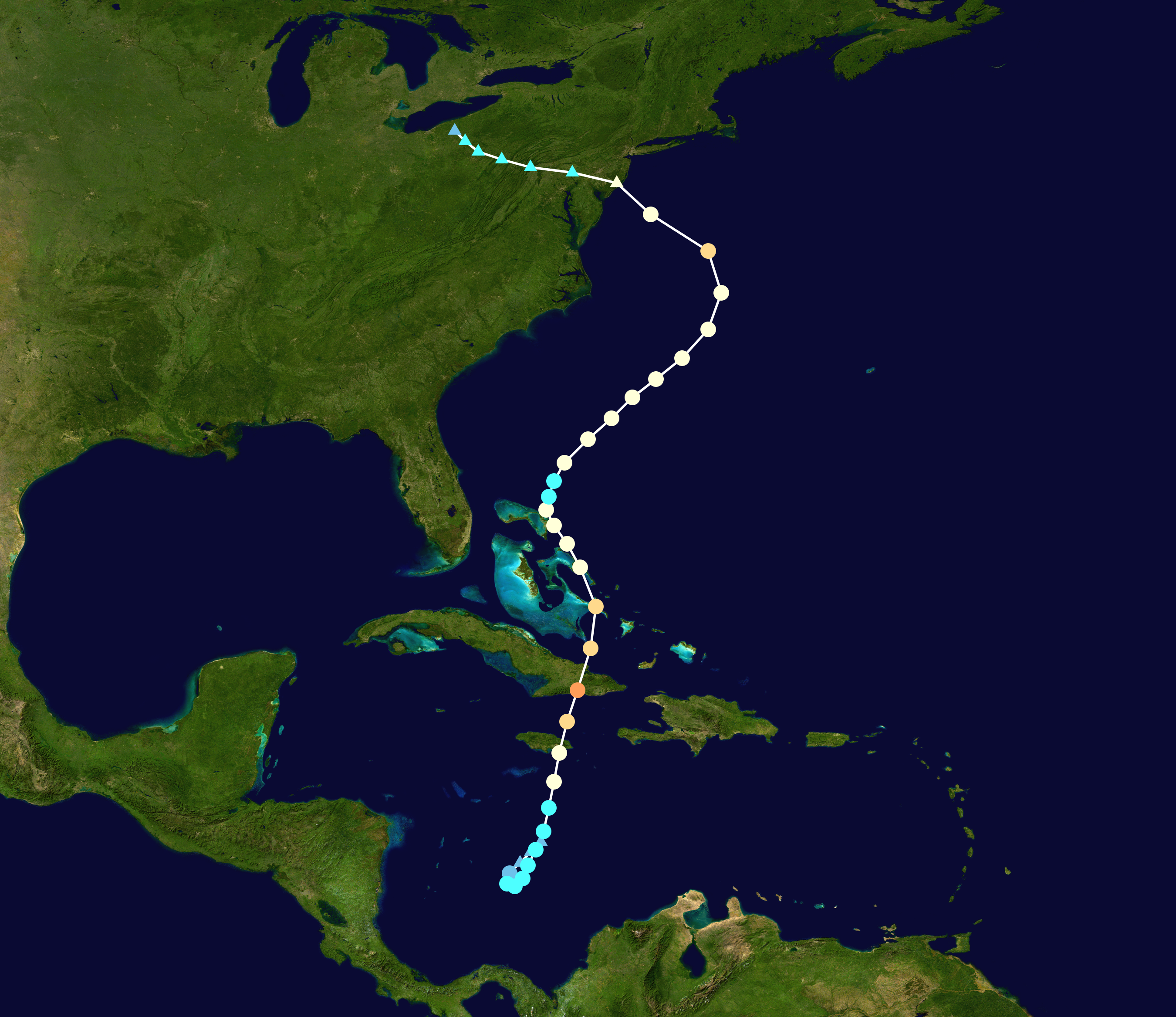
Map plotting the storm's track and intensity, according to the Saffir–Simpson scale Map key Saffir–Simpson scale Tropical depression (≤38 mph, ≤62 km/h) Tropical storm (39–73 mph, 63–118 km/h) Category 1 (74–95 mph, 119–153 km/h) Category 2 (96–110 mph, 154–177 km/h) Category 3 (111–129 mph, 178–208 km/h) Category 4 (130–156 mph, 209–251 km/h) Category 5 (≥157 mph, ≥252 km/h) Unknown Storm type Tropical cyclone Subtropical cyclone Extratropical cyclone, remnant low, tropical disturbance, or monsoon depression

Hurricane Sandy began as a low-pressure system which developed sufficient organized convection to be classified as Tropical Depression Eighteen on October 22 south of Kingston, Jamaica. It moved slowly at first due to a ridge to the north. Low wind shear and warm waters allowed for strengthening, and the system was named Tropical Storm Sandy late on October 22. Early on October 24, an eye began developing, and it was moving steadily northward due to an approaching trough. Later that day, the National Hurricane Center (NHC) upgraded Sandy to hurricane status about 65 mi (105 km) south of Kingston. At about 1900 UTC that day, Sandy made landfall near Kingston with winds of about 85 mph (137 km/h). Just offshore of Cuba, Sandy rapidly intensified to a Category 3 hurricane, with sustained winds at 115 mph (185 km/h) and a minimum central pressure of 954 millibars (28.2 inHg), and at that intensity, Sandy made landfall just west of Santiago de Cuba at 0525 UTC on October 25. Operationally, Sandy was assessed to have peaked as a high-end Category 2 hurricane, with maximum sustained winds of 110 mph (180 km/h).

After Sandy exited Cuba, the structure of the storm became disorganized, and it turned to the north-northwest over the Bahamas. By October 27, Sandy was no longer fully tropical, as evidenced by the development of frontal structures in its outer circulation. Despite strong shear, Sandy maintained its convection due to influence from an approaching trough; the same trough eventually turned the hurricane to the northeast. After briefly weakening to a tropical storm, Sandy re-intensified into a Category 1 hurricane, and on October 28 an eye began redeveloping. The storm moved around an upper-level low over the eastern United States and also to the southwest of a ridge over Atlantic Canada, turning it to the northwest.

Sandy briefly re-intensified to Category 2 intensity on the morning of October 29, by which time it had become an extremely large hurricane, with a record gale-force wind diameter of over 1,150 miles (1,850 km), and an unusually low central barometric pressure of 940 mbar, possibly due to the very large size of the system. This pressure set records as the lowest ever observed in many cities across the Northeastern United States. The convection diminished while the hurricane accelerated toward the New Jersey coast, and the cyclone was no longer tropical by 2100 UTC on October 29. About 2½ hours later, Sandy made landfall near Brigantine, New Jersey, with sustained winds of 80 mph (130 km/h). During the next four days, Sandy's remnants drifted northward and then northeastward over Ontario, before merging with another low-pressure area over Eastern Canada on November 2.

=== Forecasts ===
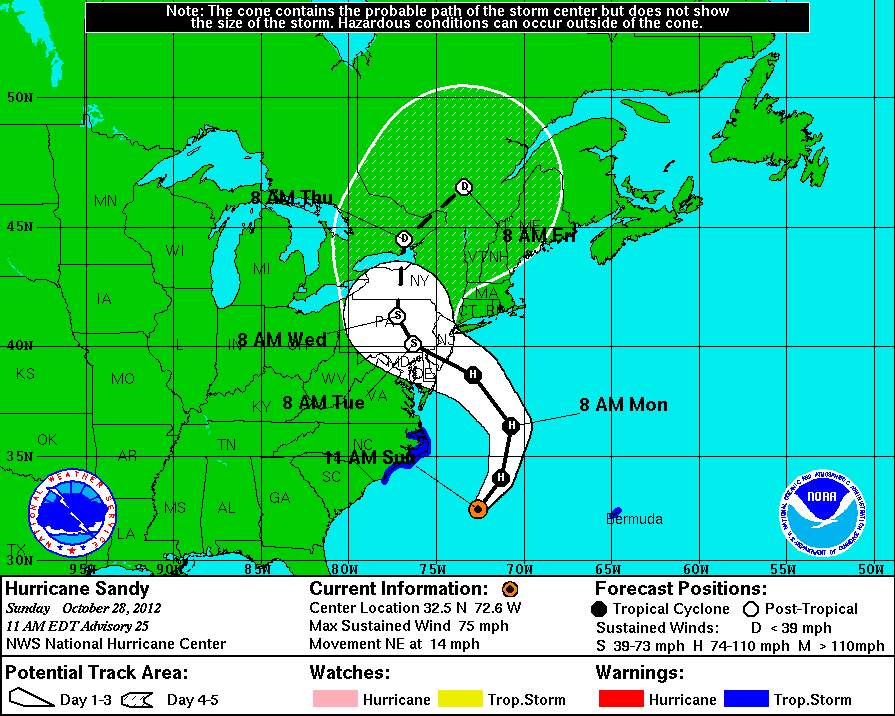
The National Hurricane Center (NHC)'s forecast for the storm as of October 28, 2012

On October 23, 2012, the path of Hurricane Sandy was correctly predicted by the European Centre for Medium-Range Weather Forecasts (ECMWF) headquartered in Reading, England, nearly eight days in advance of its striking the American East Coast. The computer model noted that the storm would turn west towards land and strike the New York/New Jersey region on October 29, rather than turn east and head out to the open Atlantic as most hurricanes in this position do. By October 27, four days after the ECMWF made its prediction, the National Weather Service and National Hurricane Center confirmed the path of the hurricane predicted by the European model. The National Weather Service was criticized for not employing its higher-resolution forecast models the way that its European counterpart did. A subsequent hardware and software upgrade completed at the end of 2013 enabled the NWS to make predictions more accurately and farther in advance than the technology in 2012 had allowed.

=== Relation to global warming ===
According to NCAR senior climatologist Kevin E. Trenberth, "The answer to the oft-asked question of whether an event is caused by climate change is that it is the wrong question. All weather events are affected by climate change because the environment in which they occur is warmer and moister than it used to be." Although NOAA meteorologist Martin Hoerling attributes Sandy to "little more than the coincidental alignment of a tropical storm with an extratropical storm", Trenberth does agree that the storm was caused by "natural variability" but adds that it was "enhanced by global warming". One factor contributing to the storm's strength was abnormally warm sea surface temperatures offshore of the East Coast of the United States—more than 5 °F (3 °C) above normal, to which global warming had contributed 1 °F (0.6 °C). As the temperature of the atmosphere increases, the capacity to hold water increases, leading to stronger storms and higher rainfall amounts.

As they move north, Atlantic hurricanes typically are forced east and out to sea by the Prevailing Westerlies. In Sandy's case, this typical pattern was blocked by a ridge of high pressure over Greenland resulting in a negative North Atlantic Oscillation, forming a kink in the jet stream and causing it to double back on itself off the East Coast. Sandy was caught up in this southeasterly flow, taking the storm on an unusual northwest path. The blocking pattern over Greenland also stalled an Arctic front which combined with the cyclone. Mark Fischetti of Scientific American said that the jet stream's unusual shape was caused by the melting of Arctic ice. Trenberth said that while a negative North Atlantic Oscillation and a blocking anticyclone were in place, the null hypothesis remained that this was just the natural variability of weather. Sea level along the New York and New Jersey coasts has increased by nearly 12 inches (30 cm) over the last hundred years, which contributed to the storm surge. One group of scientists estimated that the anthropogenic (human activity-driven) climate change was responsible for approximately 3.5 inches (8.9 cm) of sea level rise in New York, which permitted additional storm surge that caused approximately $8.1 billion out of the $60 billion in reported economic damage and to an extension of the flood zone to impact approximately 71,000 more people than would have been the case without it. Harvard geologist Daniel P. Schrag calls Hurricane Sandy's 13-foot (4.0 m) storm surge an example of what will, by mid-century, be the "new norm on the Eastern seaboard".

== Preparations ==
=== Caribbean and Bermuda ===
After the storm became a tropical cyclone on October 22, the Government of Jamaica issued a tropical storm watch for the entire island. Early on October 23, the watch was replaced with a tropical storm warning and a hurricane watch was issued. At 1500 UTC, the hurricane watch was upgraded to a hurricane warning, while the tropical storm warning was discontinued. In preparation of the storm, many residents stocked up on supplies and reinforced roofing material. Acting Prime Minister Peter Phillips urged people to take this storm seriously, and also to take care of their neighbors, especially the elderly, children, and disabled. Government officials shut down schools, government buildings, and the airport in Kingston on the day prior to the arrival of Sandy. Meanwhile, numerous and early curfews were put in place to protect residents, properties, and to prevent crime. Shortly after Jamaica issued its first watch on October 22, the Government of Haiti issued a tropical storm watch for Haiti. By late October 23, it was modified to a tropical storm warning.

The Government of Cuba posted a hurricane watch for the Cuban Provinces of Camagüey, Granma, Guantánamo, Holguín, Las Tunas, and Santiago de Cuba at 1500 UTC on October 23. Only three hours later, the hurricane watch was switched to a hurricane warning. The Government of the Bahamas, at 1500 UTC on October 23, issued a tropical storm watch for several Bahamian islands, including the Acklins, Cat Island, Crooked Island, Exuma, Inagua, Long Cay, Long Island, Mayaguana, Ragged Island, Rum Cay, and San Salvador Island. Later that day, another tropical storm watch was issued for Abaco Islands, Andros Island, the Berry Islands, Bimini, Eleuthera, Grand Bahama, and New Providence. By early on October 24, the tropical storm watch for Cat Island, Exuma, Long Island, Rum Cay, and San Salvador was upgraded to a tropical storm warning.

At 1515 UTC on October 26, the Bermuda Weather Service issued a tropical storm watch for Bermuda, reflecting the enormous size of the storm and the anticipated wide-reaching impacts.

=== United States ===
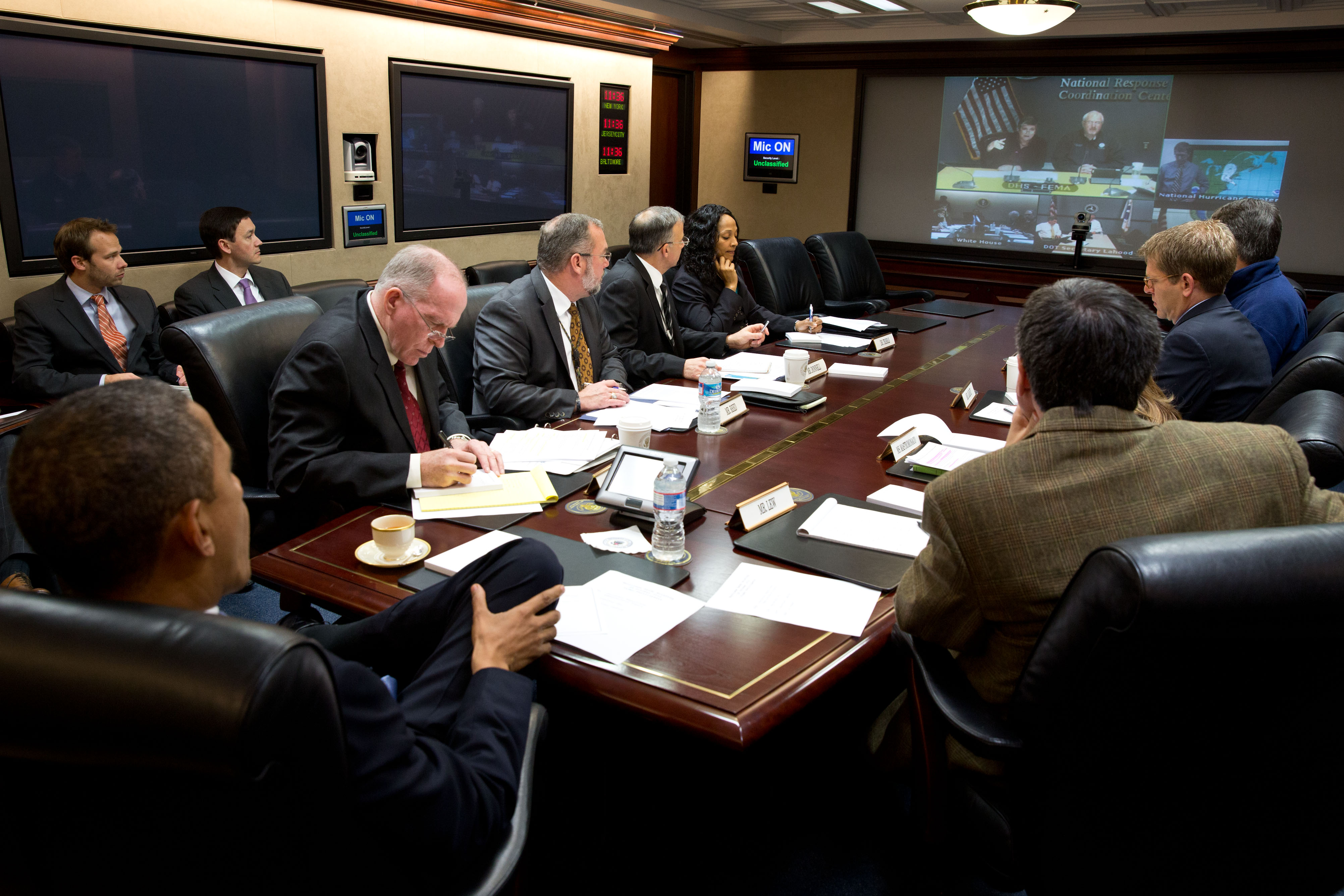
White House conference with FEMA and Department of Homeland Security in preparation for arrival of the hurricane.

Much of the East Coast of the United States, in Mid-Atlantic and New England regions, had a good chance of receiving gale-force winds, flooding, heavy rain and possibly snow early in the week of October 28 from an unusual hybrid of Hurricane Sandy and a winter storm producing a Fujiwhara effect. Government weather forecasters said there was a 90% chance that the East Coast would be impacted by the storm. Jim Cisco of the Hydrometeorological Prediction Center coined the term "Frankenstorm", as Sandy was expected to merge with a storm front a few days before Halloween. As coverage continued, several media outlets began eschewing this term in favor of "superstorm". Utilities and governments along the East Coast attempted to head off long-term power failures Sandy might cause. Power companies from the Southeast to New England alerted independent contractors to be ready to help repair storm damaged equipment quickly and asked employees to cancel vacations and work longer hours. Researchers from Johns Hopkins University, using a computer model built on power outage data from previous hurricanes, conservatively forecast that 10 million customers along the Eastern Seaboard would lose power from the storm.

Through regional offices in Atlanta, Philadelphia, New York City, and Boston, the Federal Emergency Management Agency (FEMA) monitored Sandy, closely coordinating with state and tribal emergency management partners in Florida and the Southeast, Mid-Atlantic, and New England states. President Obama signed emergency declarations on October 28 for several states expected to be impacted by Sandy, allowing them to request federal aid and make additional preparations in advance of the storm. Flight cancellations and travel alerts on the U.S. East Coast were put in place in the Mid-Atlantic and the New England areas. Over 5,000 commercial airline flights scheduled for October 28 and 29 were canceled by the afternoon of October 28 and Amtrak canceled some services through October 29 in preparation for the storm. In addition, the National Guard and U.S. Air Force put as many as 45,000 personnel in at least seven states on alert for possible duty in response to the preparations and aftermath of Sandy.

==== Southeast ====
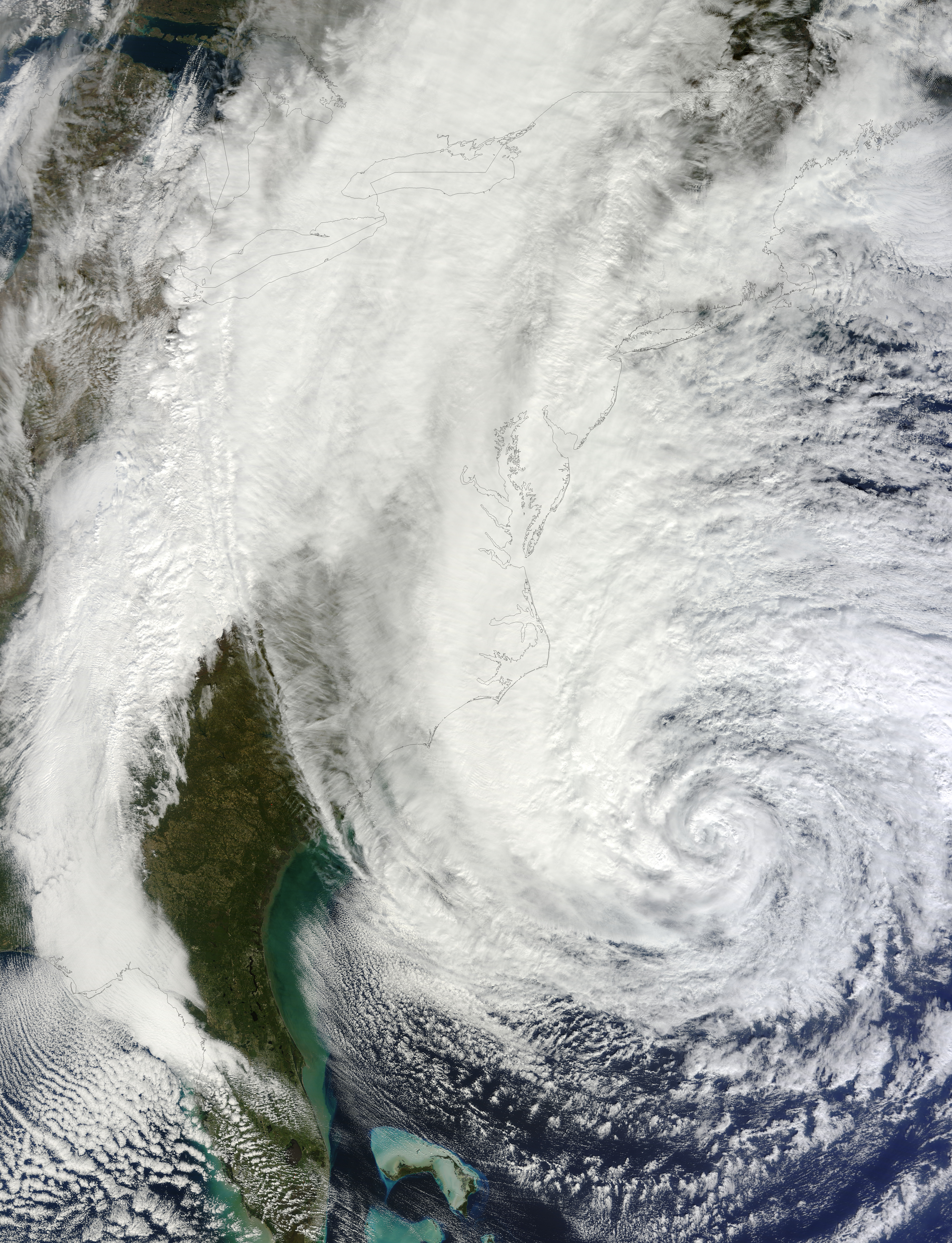
A satellite image of the storm on October 28, with most of the U.S. coastline artificially highlighted. The entire east coast is visible, with a cloudless Florida coast seen at the bottom of the image and the outline of the coast of Maine at the top right.

===== Florida =====
Schools on the Treasure Coast announced closures for October 26 in anticipation of Sandy.

===== Carolinas =====
At 0900 UTC on October 26, a tropical storm watch was issued from the mouth of the Savannah River in South Carolina to Oregon Inlet, North Carolina, including Pamlico Sound. Twelve hours later, the portion of the tropical storm watch from the Santee River in South Carolina to Duck, North Carolina, including Pamlico Sound, was upgraded to a warning. Governor of North Carolina Beverly Perdue declared a state of emergency for 38 eastern counties on October 26, which took effect on the following day. By October 29, the state of emergency was extended to 24 counties in western North Carolina, with up to 12 in (30 cm) of snow attributed to Sandy anticipated in higher elevations. The National Park Service closed at least five sections of the Blue Ridge Parkway.

==== Mid-Atlantic ====
===== Virginia =====
On October 26, Governor of Virginia Bob McDonnell declared a state of emergency. The U.S. Navy sent more than twenty-seven ships and forces to sea from Naval Station Norfolk for their protection. Governor McDonnell authorized the National Guard to activate 630 personnel ahead of the storm. Republican Party presidential candidate Mitt Romney canceled campaign appearances scheduled for October 28 in Virginia Beach, Virginia, and New Hampshire October 30 because of Sandy. Vice President Joe Biden canceled his appearance on October 27 in Virginia Beach and an October 29 campaign event in New Hampshire. President Barack Obama canceled a campaign stop with former President Bill Clinton in Virginia scheduled for October 29, as well as a trip to Colorado Springs, Colorado, the next day because of the impending storm.

===== Washington, D.C. =====
On October 26, Mayor of Washington, D.C. Vincent Gray declared a state of emergency, which President Obama signed on October 28. The United States Office of Personnel Management announced federal offices in the Washington, D.C. area would be closed to the public on October 29–30. In addition, Washington D.C. Metro service, both rail and bus, was canceled on October 29 due to expected high winds, the likelihood of widespread power outages, and the closing of the federal government. The Smithsonian Institution closed for the day of October 29.

===== Maryland =====
Governor of Maryland Martin O'Malley declared a state of emergency on October 26. By the following day, Smith Island residents were evacuated with the assistance of the Maryland Natural Resources Police, Dorchester County opened two shelters for those in flood prone areas, and Ocean City initiated Phase I of their Emergency Operations Plan. Baltimore Gas and Electric Co. put workers on standby and made plans to bring in crews from other states. On October 28, President Obama declared an emergency in Maryland and signed an order authorizing the Federal Emergency Management Agency to aid in disaster relief efforts. Also, numerous areas were ordered to be evacuated including part of Ocean City, Worcester County, Wicomico County, and Somerset County. Officials warned that more than a hundred million tons of dirty sediment mixed with tree limbs and debris floating behind Conowingo Dam could eventually pour into the Chesapeake Bay, posing a potential environmental threat.

The Maryland Transit Administration canceled all service for October 29 and 30. The cancellations applied to buses, light rail, and Amtrak and MARC train service. On October 29, six shelters opened in Baltimore, and early voting was canceled for the day. Maryland Insurance Commissioner Therese M. Goldsmith activated an emergency regulation requiring pharmacies to refill prescriptions regardless of their last refill date. On October 29, the Chesapeake Bay Bridge over the Chesapeake Bay and the Millard E. Tydings Memorial Bridge and Thomas J. Hatem Memorial Bridge over the Susquehanna River were closed to traffic in the midday hours.

===== Delaware =====
On October 28, Governor Markell declared a state of emergency, with coastal areas of Sussex County evacuated. In preparation for the storm, the Delaware Department of Transportation suspended some weekend construction projects, removed traffic cones and barrels from construction sites, and removed several span-wire overhead signs in Sussex County. Delaware Route 1 through Delaware Seashore State Park was closed due to flooding. Delaware roads were closed to the public, except for emergency and essential personnel, and tolls on I-95 and Delaware Route 1 were waived. DART First State transit service was also suspended during the storm.

===== New Jersey =====
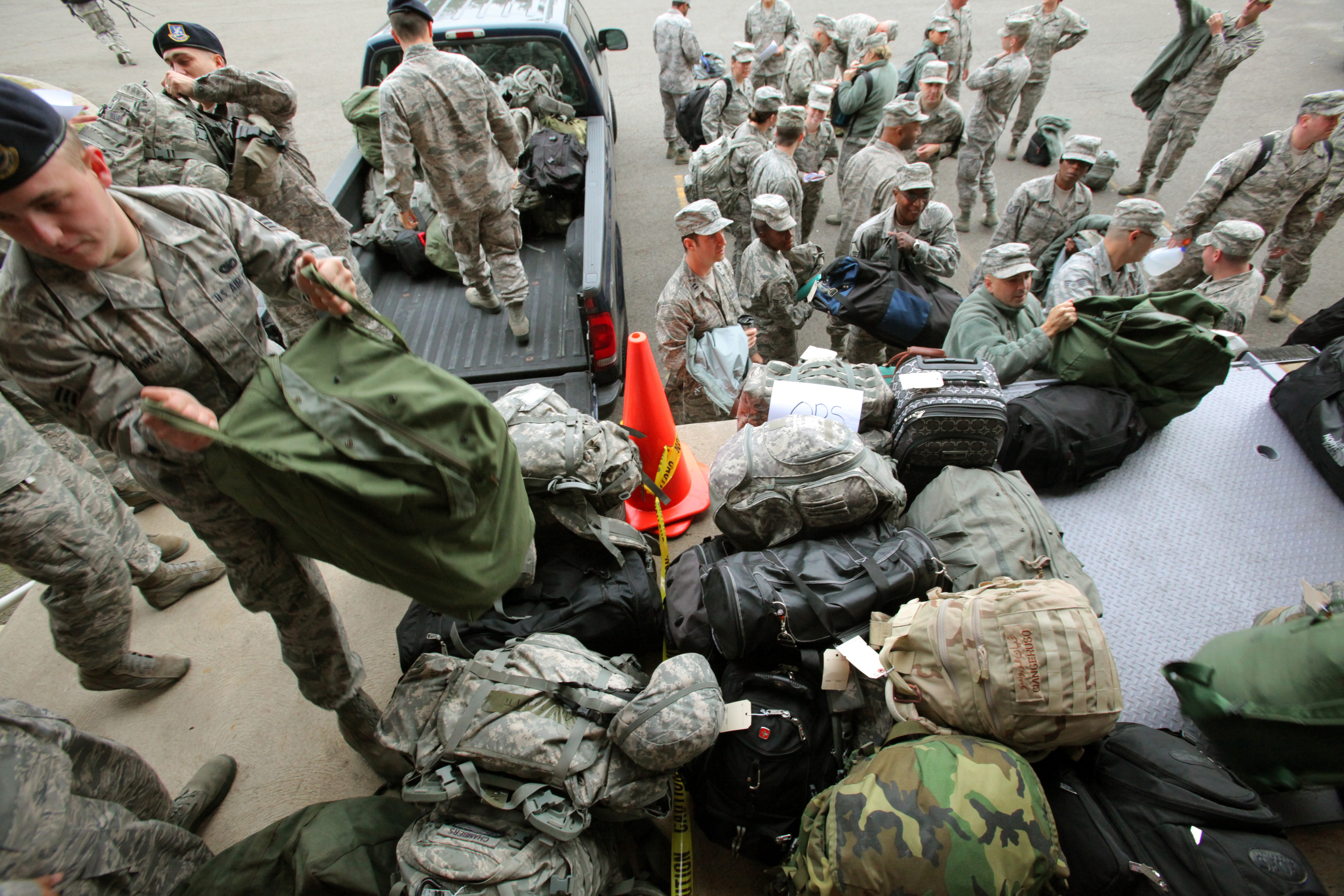
Airmen of the New Jersey Air National Guard's 108th Wing assemble before being sent to assist at various emergency shelters.

Preparations began on October 26, when officials in Cape May County advised residents on barrier islands to evacuate. There were also voluntary evacuations for Mantoloking, Bay Head, Barnegat Light, Beach Haven, Harvey Cedars, Long Beach, Ship Bottom, and Stafford in Ocean County. Governor of New Jersey Chris Christie ordered all residents of barrier islands from Sandy Hook to Cape May to evacuate and closed Atlantic City casinos. Tolls were suspended on the northbound Garden State Parkway and the westbound Atlantic City Expressway starting at 6 a.m. on October 28. President Obama signed an emergency declaration for New Jersey, allowing the state to request federal funding and other assistance for actions taken before Sandy's landfall.

On October 28, Mayor of Hoboken Dawn Zimmer ordered residents of basement and street-level residential units to evacuate, due to possible flooding. On October 29, residents of Logan Township were ordered to evacuate. Jersey Central Power & Light told employees to prepare to work extended shifts. Most schools, colleges and universities were closed October 29 while at least 509 out of 580 school districts were closed October 30. Although tropical storm conditions were inevitable and hurricane-force winds were likely, the National Hurricane Center did not issue any tropical cyclone watches or warnings for New Jersey, because Sandy was forecast to become extratropical before landfall and thus would not be a tropical cyclone.

===== Pennsylvania =====
Preparations in Pennsylvania began when Governor Tom Corbett declared a state of emergency on October 26. Mayor of Philadelphia Michael Nutter asked residents in low-lying areas and neighborhoods prone to flooding to leave their homes by 1800 UTC October 28 and move to safer ground. The Philadelphia International Airport suspended all flight operations for October 29. On October 29, Philadelphia shut down its mass transit system. On October 28, Mayor of Harrisburg Linda D. Thompson declared a state of disaster emergency for the city to go into effect at 5 a.m. October 29. Electric utilities in the state brought in crews and equipment from other states such as New Mexico, Texas, and Oklahoma, to assist with restoration efforts.

===== New York =====
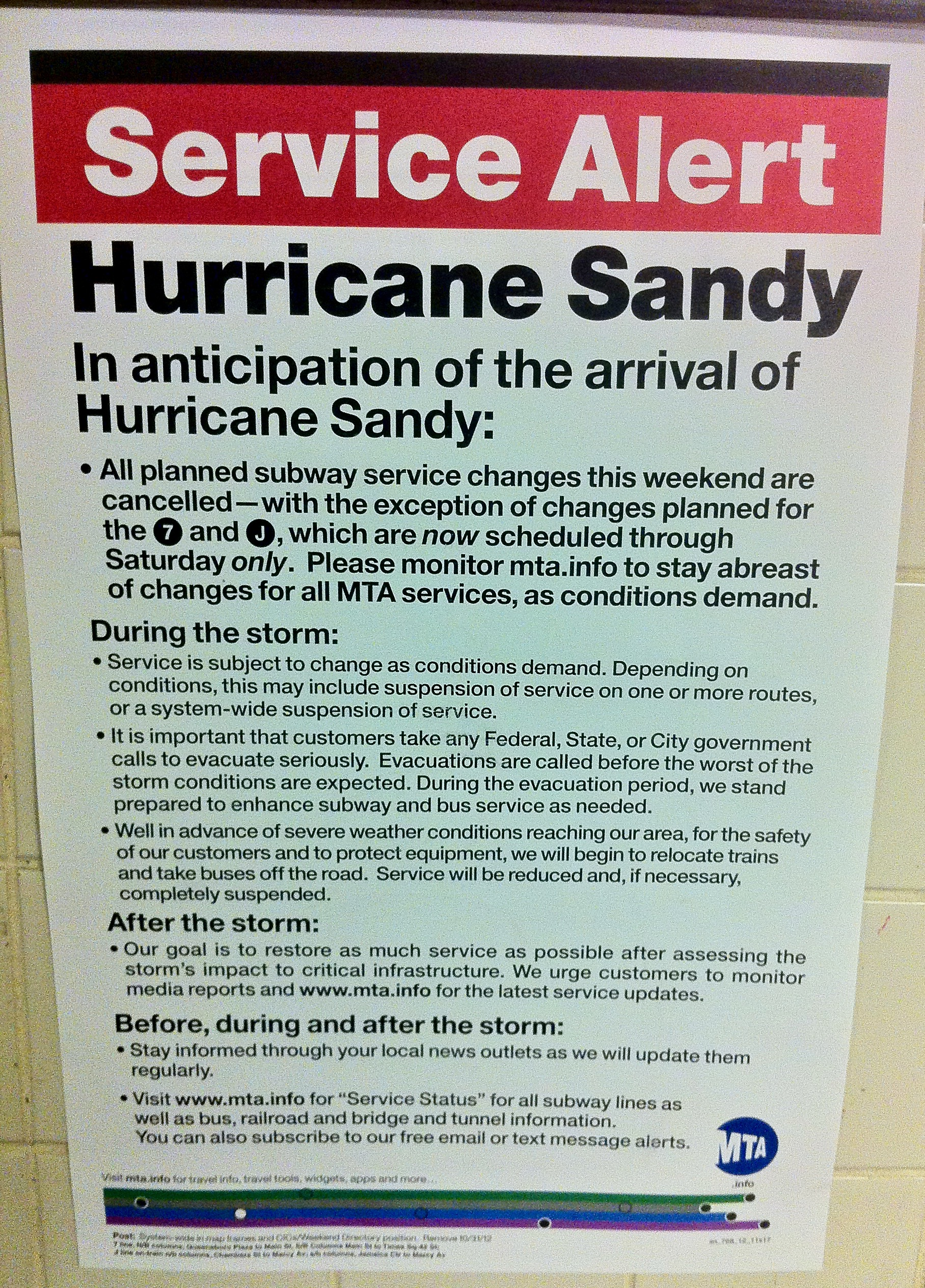
Special MTA service alerts, posted in subway stations on October 26, urged travelers to be alert for future evacuation orders or service suspension announcements.

Governor Andrew Cuomo declared a statewide state of emergency and asked for a pre-disaster declaration on October 26, which President Obama signed later that day. By October 27, major carriers canceled all flights into and out of JFK, LaGuardia, and Newark-Liberty airports, and Metro North and the Long Island Rail Road suspended service. The Tappan Zee Bridge was closed, and later the Brooklyn Battery Tunnel and Holland Tunnel were also closed. On Long Island, an evacuation was ordered for South Shore, including areas south of Sunrise Highway, north of Route 25A, and in elevations of less than 16 feet (4.9 m) above sea level on the North Shore. In Suffolk County, mandatory evacuations were ordered for residents of Fire Island and six towns. Most schools closed in Nassau and Suffolk counties on October 29.

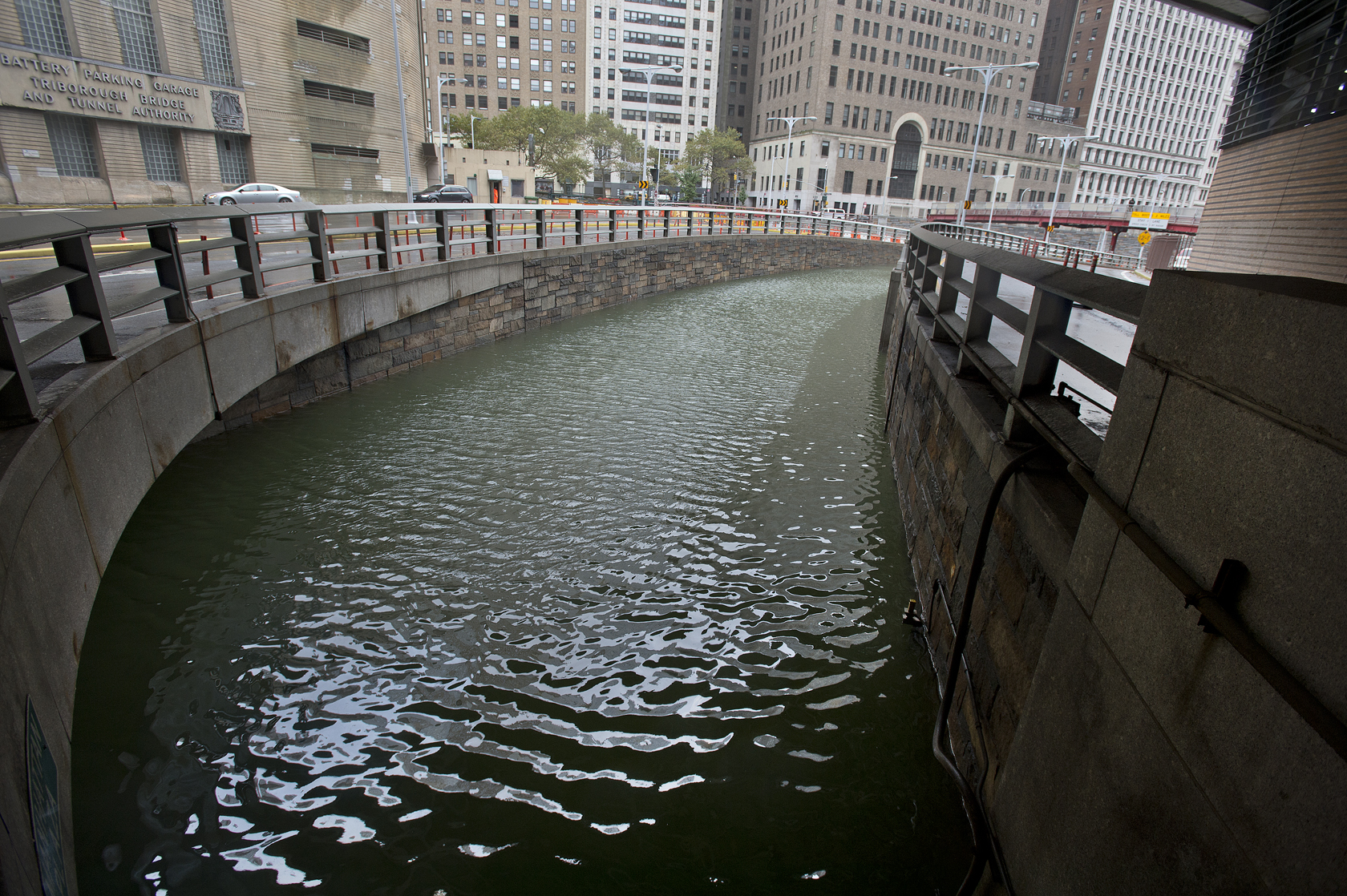
The Brooklyn–Battery Tunnel remained flooded on the Tuesday morning after the storm.

New York City began taking precautions on October 26. Governor Cuomo ordered the closure of MTA and its subway on October 28, and the MTA suspended all subway, bus, and commuter rail service beginning at 2300 UTC. After Hurricane Irene nearly submerged subways and tunnels in 2011, entrances and grates were covered just before Sandy, but were still flooded. PATH train service and stations as well as the Port Authority Bus Terminal were shut down in the early morning hours of October 29.

Later on October 28, officials activated the coastal emergency plan, with subway closings and the evacuation of residents in areas hit by Hurricane Irene in 2011. More than 76 evacuation shelters were open around the city. On October 28, Mayor Michael Bloomberg ordered that all public schools be closed on Monday and announced a mandatory evacuation of Zone A, which comprised areas near coastlines or waterways. Additionally, 200 National Guard troops were deployed in the city. NYU Langone Medical Center canceled all surgeries and medical procedures, except for emergency procedures. Additionally, one of NYU Langone Medical Center's backup generators failed on October 29, prompting the evacuation of hundreds of patients, including those from the hospital's various intensive care units. U.S. stock trading was suspended for October 29 to 30.

==== New England ====
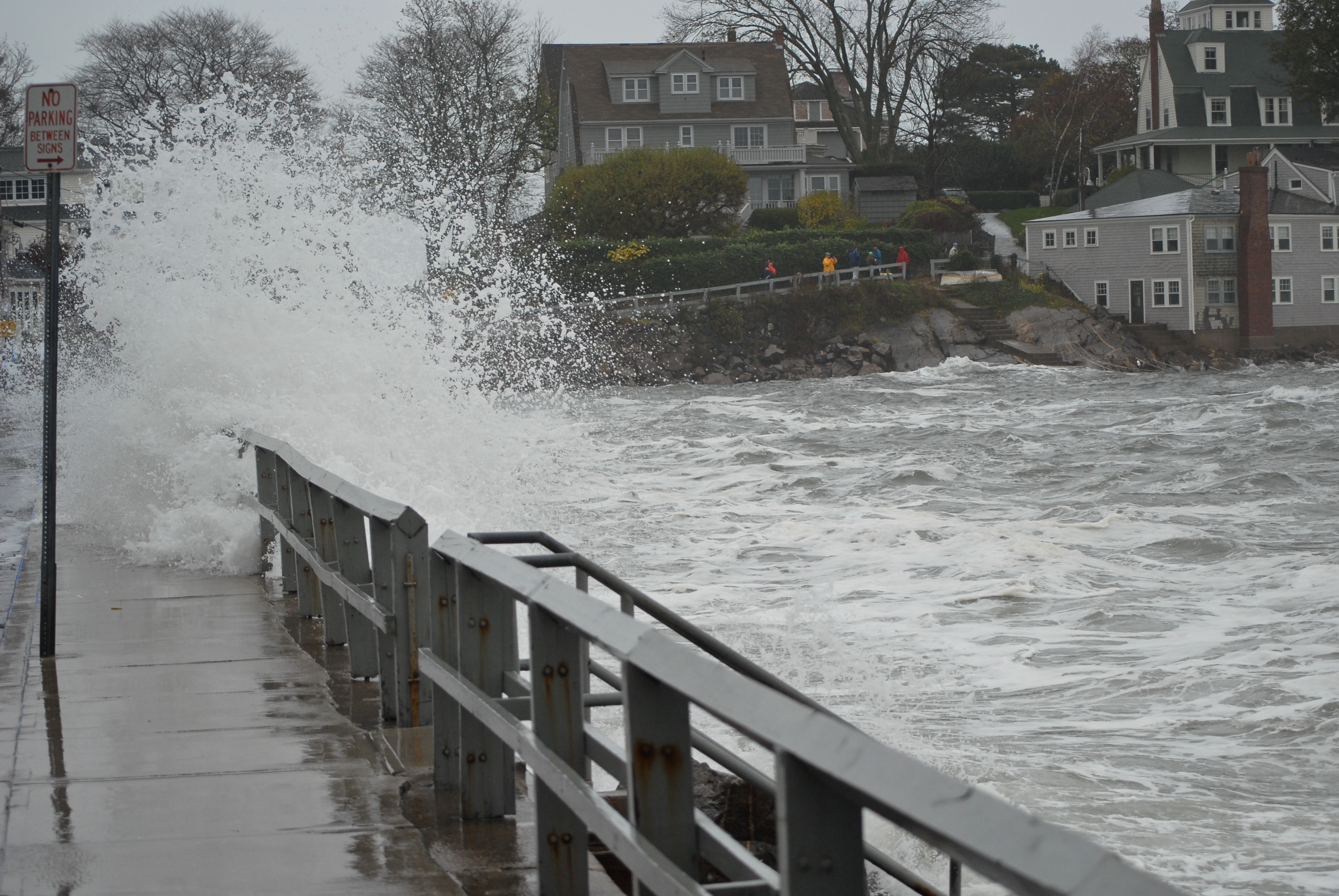
Flooding in Marblehead, Massachusetts, caused by Hurricane Sandy on October 29.

Connecticut Governor Dannel Malloy partially activated the state's Emergency Operations Center on October 26 and signed a Declaration of Emergency the next day. On October 28, President Obama approved Connecticut's request for an emergency declaration, and hundreds of National Guard personnel were deployed. On October 29, Governor Malloy ordered road closures for all state highways. Numerous mandatory and partial evacuations were issued in cities across Connecticut.

Massachusetts Governor Deval Patrick ordered state offices to be closed October 29 and recommended schools and private businesses close. On October 28, President Obama issued a Pre-Landfall Emergency Declaration for Massachusetts. Several shelters were opened, and many schools were closed. The Massachusetts Bay Transportation Authority shut down all services on the afternoon of October 29. On October 28, Vermont Governor Peter Shumlin, New Hampshire Governor John Lynch, and Maine Governor Paul LePage all declared states of emergency.

==== Appalachia and the Midwest ====
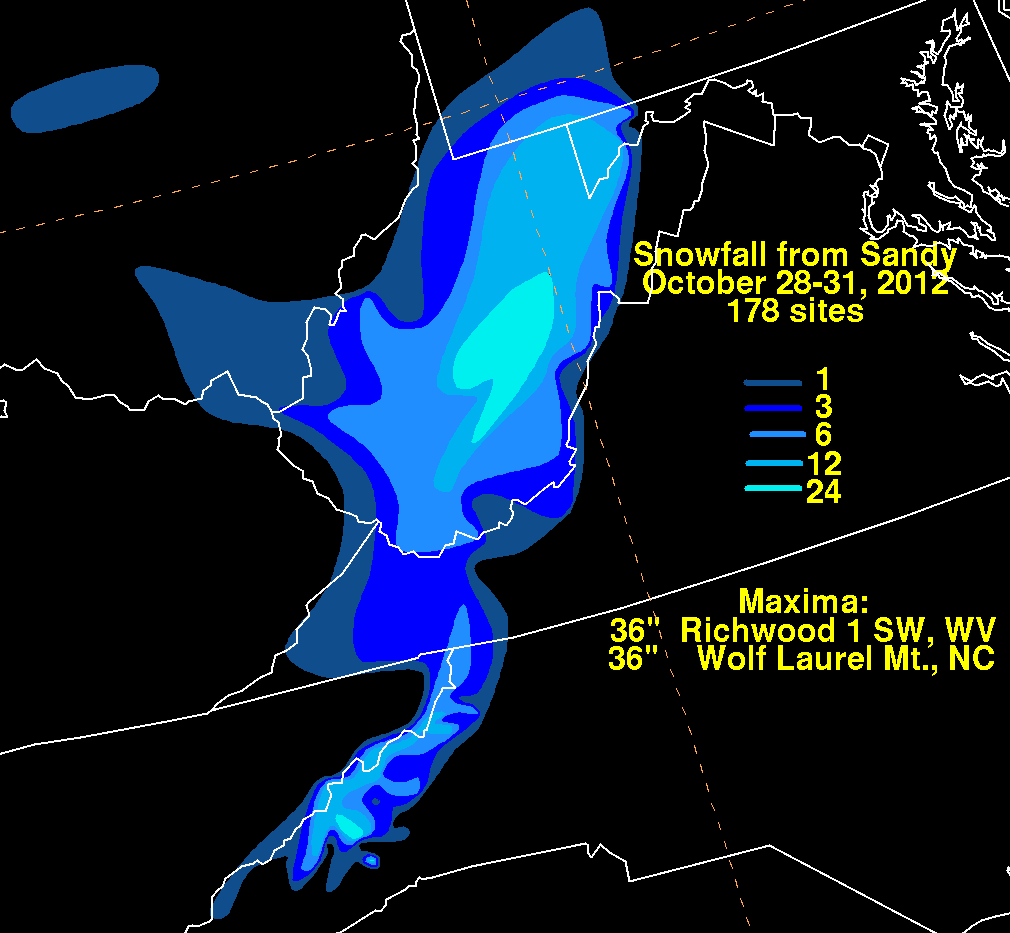
Snowfall totals in the Appalachian mountain range (amount in inches)

The National Weather Service issued a storm warning for Lake Huron on October 29 that called for wave heights of 26 feet (7.9 m), and possibly as high as 38 feet (12 m). Lake Michigan waves were expected to reach 19 feet (5.8 m), with a potential of 33 feet (10 m) on October 30. Flood warnings were issued in Chicago on October 29, where wave heights were expected to reach 18 to 23 feet (5.5 to 7.0 m) in Cook County and 25 feet (7.6 m) in northwest Indiana. Gale warnings were issued for Lake Michigan and Green Bay in Wisconsin until the morning of October 31, and waves of 33 feet (10 m) in Milwaukee and 20 feet (6.1 m) in Sheboygan were predicted for October 30. The actual waves reached about 20 feet (6.1 m) but were less damaging than expected. The village of Pleasant Prairie, Wisconsin urged a voluntary evacuation of its lakefront area, though few residents signed up, and little flooding actually occurred.

Michigan was impacted by a winter storm system coming in from the west, mixing with cold air streams from the Arctic and colliding with Hurricane Sandy. The forecasts slowed shipping traffic on the Great Lakes, as some vessels sought shelter away from the peak winds, except those on Lake Superior. Detroit-based DTE Energy released 100 contract line workers to assist utilities along the eastern U.S. with storm response, and Consumers Energy did the same with more than a dozen employees and 120 contract employees. Due to the widespread power outages, numerous schools had to close, especially in St. Clair County and areas along Lake Huron north of Metro Detroit.

As far as Ohio's western edge, areas were under a wind advisory. All departing flights at Cleveland Hopkins International Airport were canceled until October 30 at 3 p.m.

Governor of West Virginia Earl Ray Tomblin declared a state of emergency ahead of storm on October 29. Up to 2 to 3 feet (0.61 to 0.91 m) of snow was forecast for mountainous areas of the state.

In Great Smoky Mountains National Park, in Tennessee, several inches of snow led to the closure of a major route through the park on Sunday, October 28, and again, after a brief reopening, on Monday, October 29, 2012.

=== Canada ===
The Canadian Hurricane Centre issued its first preliminary statement for Hurricane Sandy on October 25 from Southern Ontario to the Canadian Maritimes, with the potential for heavy rain and strong winds. On October 29, Environment Canada issued severe wind warnings for the Great Lakes and St. Lawrence Valley corridor, from Southwestern Ontario as far as Quebec City. On October 30, Environment Canada issued storm surge warnings along the mouth of the St. Lawrence River. Rainfall warnings were issued for the Charlevoix region in Quebec, as well as for several counties in New Brunswick, and Nova Scotia, where about 2 to 3 inches (51 to 76 mm) of rain was to be expected. Freezing rain warnings were issued for parts of Northern Ontario.

== Impact ==
Deaths and damage by country
Country	Fatalities				Damage 2012 (USD)	Ref(s)
Country	Total	Direct	Indirect	N/A	Damage 2012 (USD)	Ref(s)
Bermuda	0	0	0	0	Minimal	
The Bahamas	2	2	0	0	$700 million	
Canada	2	1	1	0	$100 million	
Cuba	11	6	0	5	$2 billion	
Dominican Republic	2	2	0	0	$30 million	
Haiti	75	20	0	55	$750 million	
Jamaica	2	1	1	0	$100 million	
United States	158	72	85	1	$65 billion	
U.S. offshore	2	2	0	0	—N/a	
Totals:	254	106	87	56	$68.7 billion	

A total of 254 people were killed across the United States, the Caribbean, and Canada, as a result of the storm.

=== Caribbean ===
==== Jamaica ====
Jamaica was the first country directly affected by Sandy, which was also the first hurricane to make landfall on the island since Hurricane Gilbert, which struck the island in 1988. Trees and power lines were snapped and shanty houses were heavily damaged, both from the winds and flooding rains. More than 100 fishermen were stranded in outlying Pedro Cays off Jamaica's southern coast. Stones falling from a hillside crushed one man to death as he tried to get into his house in a rural village near Kingston. After 6 days another fatality recorded as a 27-year-old man, died due to electrocution, attempting a repair. The country's sole electricity provider, the Jamaica Public Service Company, reported that 70 percent of its customers were without power. More than 1,000 people went to shelters. Jamaican authorities closed the island's international airports, and police ordered 48-hour curfews in major towns to keep people off the streets and deter looting. Most buildings in the eastern portion of the island lost their roofs. Damage was assessed at approximately $100 million throughout the country.

==== Hispaniola ====
In Haiti, which was still recovering from both the 2010 earthquake and the 2010s cholera outbreak, a total of 75 people died, and approximately 200,000 were left homeless as a result of four days of ongoing rain from Hurricane Sandy. Heavy damage occurred in Port-Salut after rivers overflowed their banks. In the capital of Port-au-Prince, streets were flooded by the heavy rains, and it was reported that "the whole south of the country is underwater". Most of the tents and buildings in the city's sprawling refugee camps and the Cité Soleil neighborhood were flooded or leaking, a repeat of what happened earlier in the year during the passage of Hurricane Isaac. Crops were also wiped out by the storm and the country would be making an appeal for emergency aid. Damage in Haiti was estimated at $750 million (2012 USD), making it the costliest tropical cyclone in Haitian history. In the month following Sandy, a resurgence of cholera linked to the storm killed at least 44 people and infected more than 5,000 others.

In the neighboring Dominican Republic, two people were killed and 30,000 people evacuated. An employee of CNN estimated 70% of the streets in Santo Domingo were flooded. One person was killed in Juana Díaz, Puerto Rico after being swept away by a swollen river.

==== Cuba ====
Costliest Cuban hurricanes
Rank	Hurricane	Season	Damage	Refs.
1	Irma	2017	$13.2 billion	
2	Ike	2008	$7.3 billion	
3	Matthew	2016	$2.58 billion	
4	Gustav	2008	$2.1 billion	
5	Michelle	2001	$2 billion	
5	Sandy	2012	$2 billion	
7	Dennis	2005	$1.5 billion	
8	Ivan	2004	$1.2 billion	
9	Rafael	2024	$1.08 billion	
10	Charley	2004	$923 million	

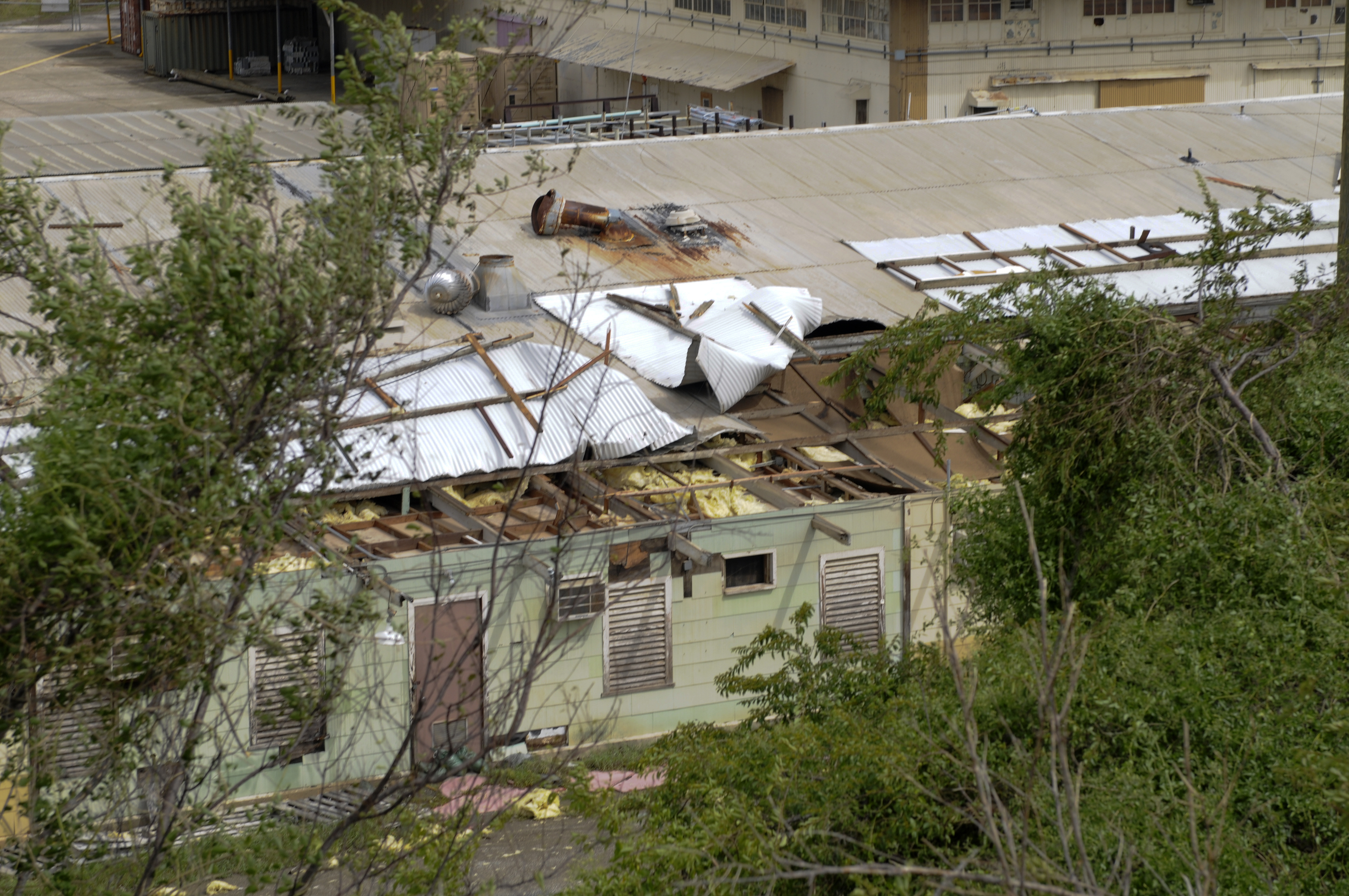
Hurricane Sandy damage in Guantanamo Bay

At least 55,000 people were evacuated before Hurricane Sandy's arrival. While moving ashore, the storm produced waves up to 29 feet (8.8 metres) and a 6-foot (1.8-metre) storm surge that caused extensive coastal flooding. There was widespread damage, particularly to Santiago de Cuba where 132,733 homes were damaged, of which 15,322 were destroyed and 43,426 lost their roof. Electricity and water services were knocked out, and most of the trees in the city were damaged. Total losses throughout Santiago de Cuba province is estimated as high as $2 billion. Sandy killed 11 people in the country – nine in Santiago de Cuba Province and two in Guantánamo Province; most of the victims were trapped in destroyed houses. This makes Sandy the deadliest hurricane to hit Cuba since 2005, when Hurricane Dennis killed 16 people.

==== Bahamas ====
A NOAA automated station at Settlement Point on Grand Bahama Island reported sustained winds of 49 mph (79 km/h) and a wind gust of 63 mph (101 km/h). One person died from falling off his roof while attempting to fix a window shutter in the Lyford Cay area on New Providence. Another died in the Queen's Cove area on Grand Bahama Island where he drowned after the sea surge trapped him in his apartment. Portions of the Bahamas lost power or cellular service, including an islandwide power outage on Bimini. Five homes were severely damaged near Williams's Town. Overall damage in the Bahamas was about $700 million, with the most severe damage on Cat Island and Exuma where many houses were heavily damaged by wind and storm surge.

=== Bermuda ===
Owing to the sheer size of the storm, Sandy also impacted Bermuda with high winds and heavy rains. On October 28, a weak F0 tornado touched down in Sandys Parish, damaging homes and businesses. During a three-day span, the storm produced 0.98 in (25 mm) of rain at the L.F. Wade International Airport. The strongest winds were recorded on October 29: sustained winds reached 37 mph (60 km/h) and gusts peaked at 58 mph (93 km/h), which produced scattered minor damage.

=== United States ===
Costliest U.S. Atlantic hurricanes (Note: The storm category color indicates the intensity of the hurricane when landfalling in the U.S.)
Rank	Hurricane	Season	Damage
1	3 Katrina	2005	$125 billion
1	4 Harvey	2017	$125 billion
3	4 Ian	2022	$112 billion
4	4 Maria	2017	$90 billion
5	4 Helene	2024	$78.7 billion
6	4 Ida	2021	$75 billion
7	ET Sandy	2012	$65 billion
8	4 Irma	2017	$52.1 billion
9	3 Milton	2024	$34.3 billion
10	2 Ike	2008	$30 billion

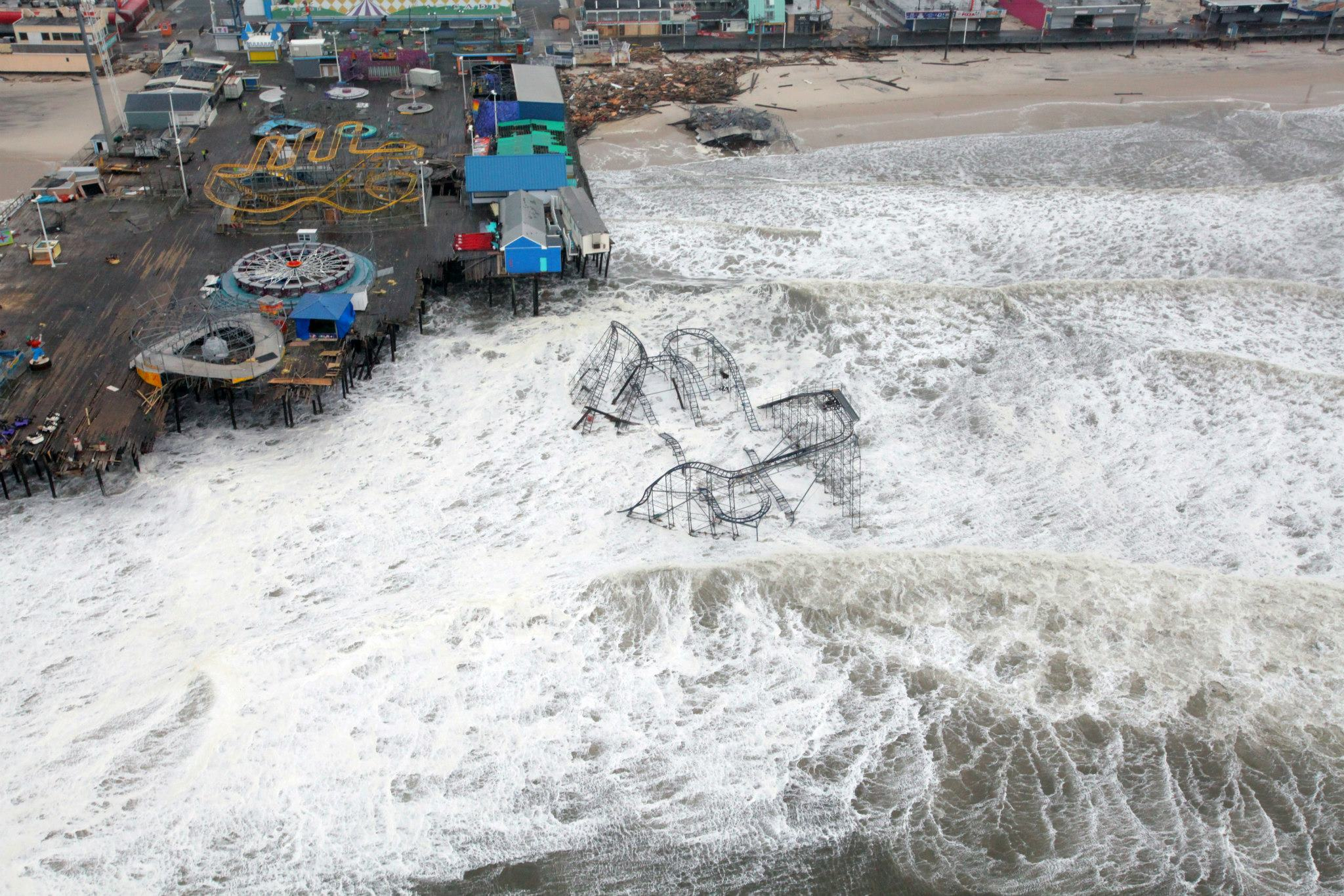
Damage to Casino Pier in Seaside Heights, New Jersey

A total of 24 U.S. states were in some way affected by Sandy. The hurricane caused tens of billions of dollars in damage in the United States, destroyed thousands of homes, left millions without electric service, and caused 71 direct deaths in nine states, including 49 in New York, 10 in New Jersey, 3 in Connecticut, 2 each in Pennsylvania and Maryland, and 1 each in New Hampshire, Virginia and West Virginia. There were also 2 direct deaths from Sandy in U.S. coastal waters in the Atlantic Ocean, about 90 miles (140 km) off the North Carolina coast, which are not counted in the U.S. total. In addition, the storm resulted in 87 indirect deaths. In all, a total of 160 people were killed due to the storm, making Sandy the deadliest hurricane to hit the United States mainland since Hurricane Katrina in 2005 and the deadliest to hit the U.S. East Coast since Hurricane Agnes in 1972.

Due to flooding and other storm-related problems, Amtrak canceled all Acela Express, Northeast Regional, Keystone, and Shuttle services for October 29 and 30. More than 13,000 flights were canceled across the U.S. on October 29, and more than 3,500 were called off October 30. From October 27 through early November 1, airlines canceled a total of 19,729 flights, according to FlightAware.

On October 31, over 6 million customers were still without power in 15 states and the District of Columbia. The states with the most customers without power were New Jersey with 2,040,195 customers; New York with 1,933,147; Pennsylvania with 852,458; and Connecticut with 486,927.

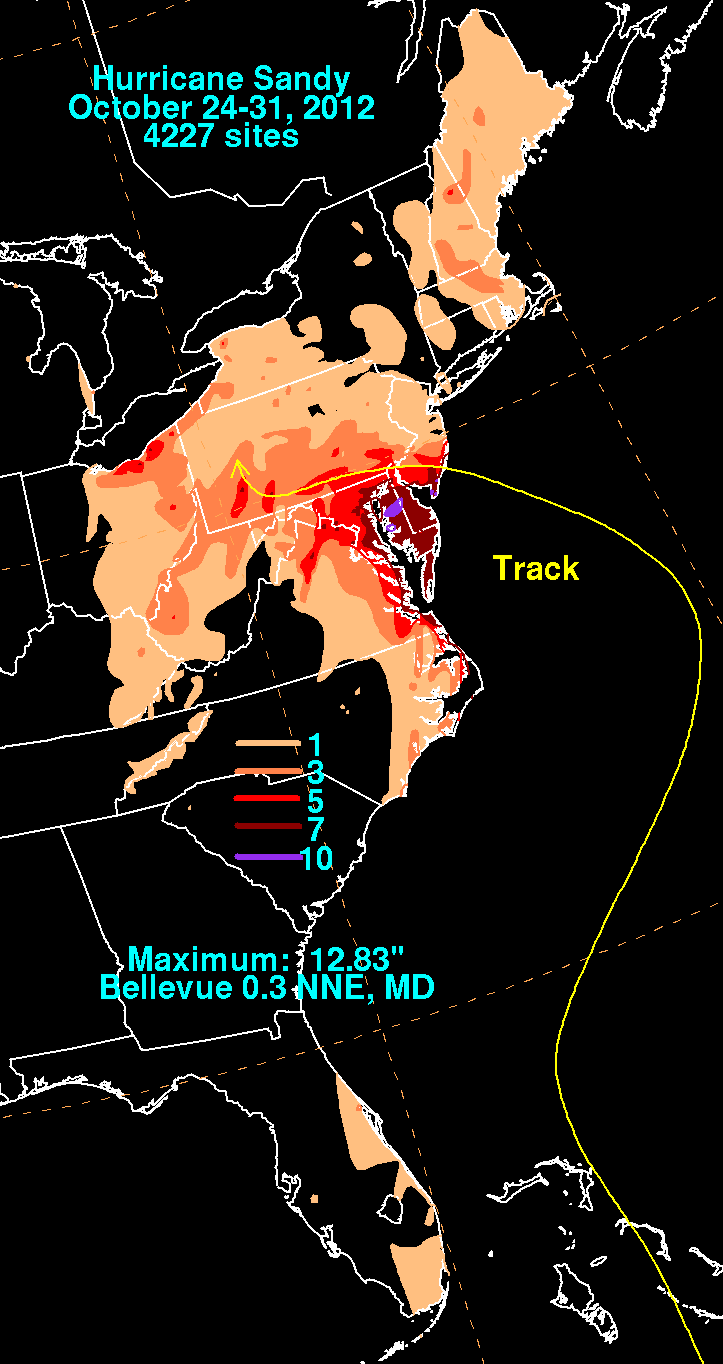
Storm total rainfall for Sandy (2012) across the United States

The New York Stock Exchange and Nasdaq reopened on October 31 after a two-day closure for the storm. More than 1,500 FEMA personnel were along the East Coast working to support disaster preparedness and response operations, including search and rescue, situational awareness, communications and logistical support. In addition, 28 teams containing 294 FEMA Corps members were pre-staged to support Sandy responders. Three federal urban search and rescue task forces were positioned in the Mid-Atlantic and ready to deploy as needed. Direct Relief provided medical supplies to community clinics, non-profit health centers, and other groups in areas affected by Hurricane Sandy, and mapped pharmacies, gas stations, and other facilities that remained in the New York City area despite power outages.

On November 2, the American Red Cross announced they had 4,000 disaster workers across storm damaged areas, with thousands more en route from other states. Nearly 7,000 people spent the night in emergency shelters across the region.

Hurricane Sandy: Coming Together, a live telethon on November 2 that featured rock and pop stars such as Bruce Springsteen, Billy Joel, Jon Bon Jovi, Mary J. Blige, Sting, and Christina Aguilera, raised around $23 million for American Red Cross hurricane relief efforts.

At the time, the National Hurricane Center ranked Hurricane Sandy the second-costliest U.S. hurricane since 1900 (in constant 2010 dollars), and the sixth-costliest after adjusting for inflation, population and property values. Scientists at the University of Utah reported the energy generated by Sandy was equivalent to "small earthquakes between magnitudes 2 and 3".

==== Southeast ====
===== Florida =====
In South Florida, Sandy lashed the area with rough surf, strong winds, and brief squalls. Along the coast of Miami-Dade County, waves reached 10 feet (3.0 m), but may have been as high as 20 feet (6.1 m) in Palm Beach County. In the former county, minor pounding occurred on a few coastal roads. Further north in Broward County, State Road A1A was inundated with sand and water, causing more than a two-mile (3.2 km) stretch of the road to be closed for the entire weekend. Additionally, coastal flooding extended inland up to 2 blocks in some locations and a few houses in the area suffered water damage. In Manalapan, which is located in southern Palm Beach County, several beachfront homes were threatened by erosion. The Lake Worth Pier was also damaged by rough seas. In Palm Beach County alone, losses reached $14 million. Sandy caused closures and cancellations of some activities at schools in Palm Beach, Broward and Miami-Dade counties. Storm surge from Sandy also caused flooding and beach erosion along coastal areas in South Florida. Gusty winds also impacted South Florida, peaking at 67 mph (108 km/h) in Jupiter and Fowey Rocks Light, which is near Key Biscayne. The storm created power outages across the region, which left many traffic lights out of order.

In east-central Florida, damage was minor, though the storm left about 1,000 people without power. Airlines at Miami International Airport canceled more than 20 flights to or from Jamaica or the Bahamas, while some airlines flying from Fort Lauderdale–Hollywood International Airport canceled a total of 13 flights to the islands. The Coast Guard rescued two sea men in Volusia County off New Smyrna Beach on the morning of October 26. Brevard and Volusia Counties schools canceled all extracurricular activities for October 26, including football.

Two panther kittens escaped from the White Oak Conservation Center in Nassau County after the hurricane swept a tree into the fence of their enclosure; they were missing for 24 hours before being found in good health.

===== North Carolina =====
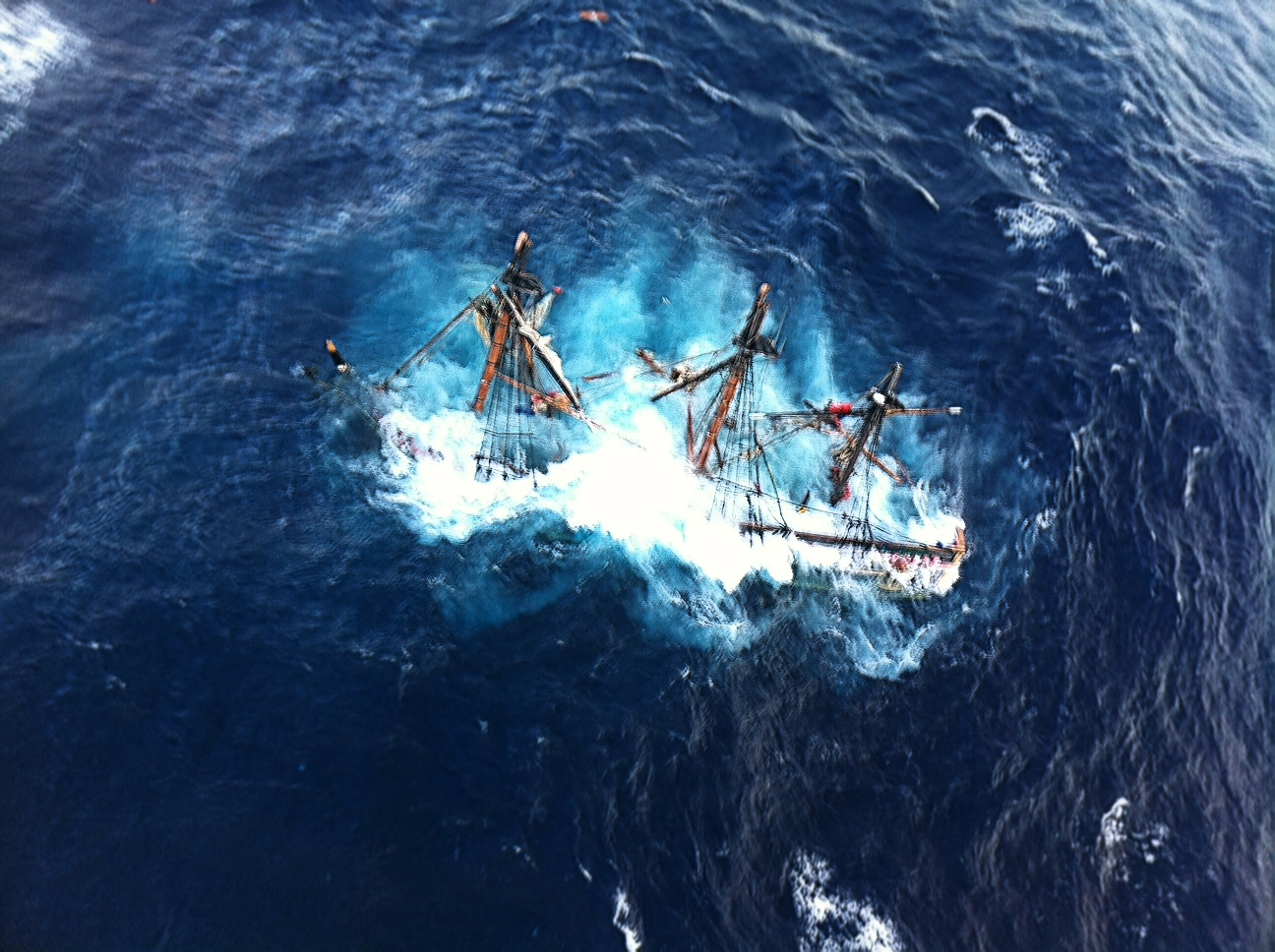
The 180-foot (55 m) sailing ship, Bounty, is shown nearly submerged during Hurricane Sandy in the Atlantic Ocean approximately 90 miles (140 km) southeast of Hatteras, North Carolina on Monday, October 29, 2012.

On October 28, Governor Bev Perdue declared a state of emergency in 24 western counties, due to snow and strong winds.

North Carolina was spared from major damage for the most part (except at the immediate coastline), though winds, rain, and mountain snow affected the state through October 30. Ocracoke and Highway 12 on Hatteras Island were flooded with up to 2 feet (0.6 m) of water, closing part of the highway, while 20 people on a fishing trip were stranded on Portsmouth Island.

There were three Hurricane Sandy-related deaths in the state.

On October 29, the Coast Guard responded to a distress call from Bounty, which was built for the 1962 movie Mutiny on the Bounty. It was taking on water about 90 miles (140 km) southeast of Cape Hatteras. Sixteen people were on board. The Coast Guard said the 16 people abandoned ship and got into two lifeboats, wearing survival suits and life jackets. The ship sank after the crew got off. The Coast Guard rescued 14 crew members; another was found hours later but was unresponsive and later died. The search for the captain, Robin Walbridge, was suspended on November 1, after efforts lasting more than 90 hours and covering approximately 12,000 square nautical miles (41,100 km^{2}).

==== Mid-Atlantic ====
===== Virginia =====
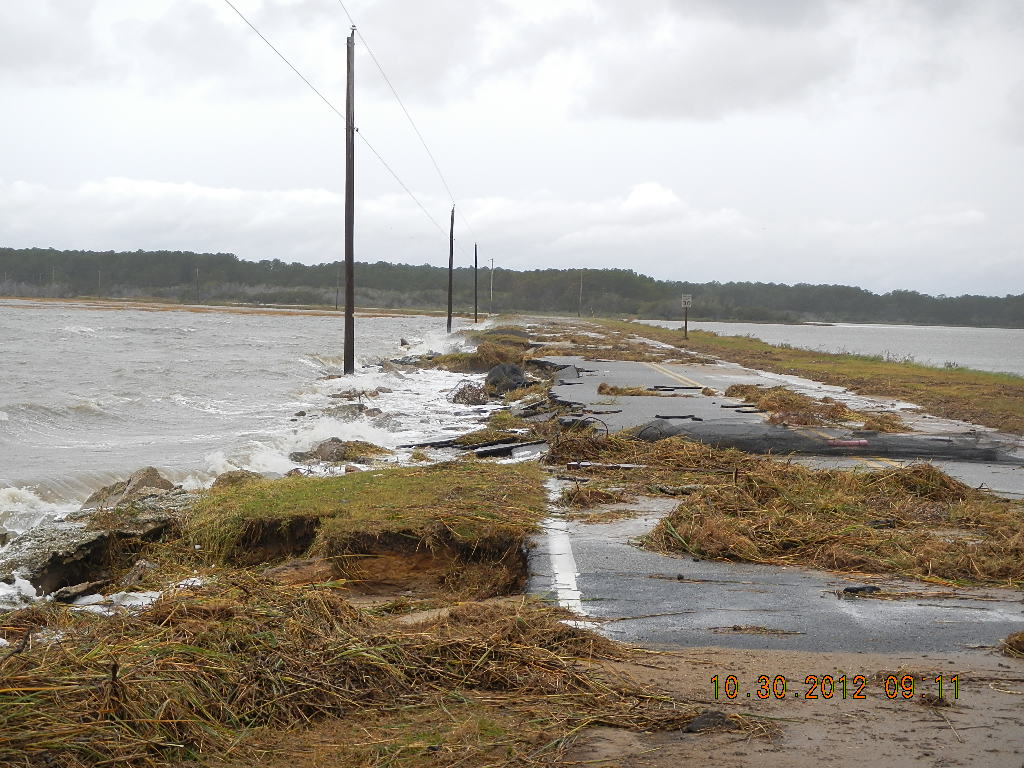
Damaged road at Chincoteague National Wildlife Refuge on Assateague Island

On October 29, snow was falling in parts of the state. Shenandoah National Park, buried under about a foot of snow by October 31, was closed starting October 28, and would remain closed for at least several days. The storm resulted in Blacksburg recording its first measurable October snowfall in half a century. Gov. Bob McDonnell announced on October 30 that Virginia had been "spared a significant event", but cited concerns about rivers cresting and consequent flooding of major arteries. Virginia was awarded a federal disaster declaration, with Gov. McDonnell saying he was "delighted" that President Barack Obama and FEMA were on it immediately. At Sandy's peak, more than 180,000 customers were without power, most of whom were located in Northern Virginia. There were three Hurricane Sandy-related fatalities in the state.

===== Maryland and Washington, D.C. =====
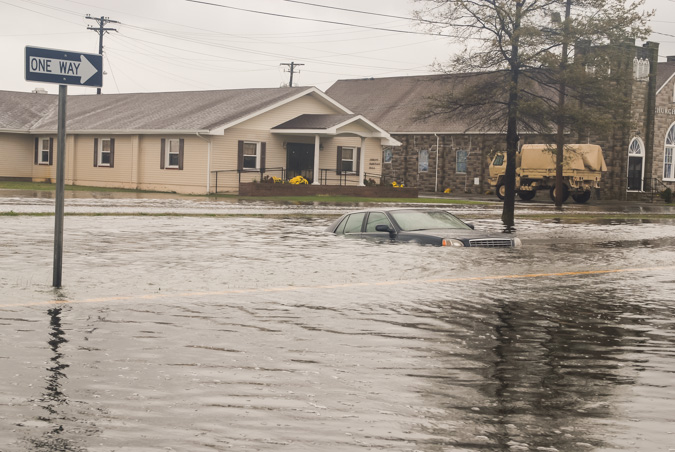
Flooding in Crisfield, Maryland

The Supreme Court and the United States Government Office of Personnel Management were closed on October 30, and schools were closed for two days. MARC train and Virginia Railway Express were closed on October 30, and Metro rail and bus service were on Sunday schedule, opening at 2 p.m., until the system closes.

At least 100 feet (30 m) of a fishing pier in Ocean City was destroyed. Governor Martin O'Malley said the pier was "half-gone". Due to high winds, the Chesapeake Bay Bridge and the Millard E. Tydings Memorial Bridge on I-95 were closed. During the storm, the Mayor of Salisbury instituted a Civil Emergency and a curfew. Interstate 68 in far western Maryland and northern West Virginia closed due to heavy snow, stranding multiple vehicles and requiring assistance from the National Guard. Redhouse, Maryland received 26 inches (66 cm) of snow and Alpine Lake, West Virginia received 24 inches (61 cm).

Workers in Howard County tried to stop a sewage overflow caused by a power outage on October 30. Raw sewage spilled at a rate of 2 million gallons per hour. It was unclear how much sewage had flowed into the Little Patuxent River. Over 311,000 people were left without power as a result of the storm.

===== Delaware =====
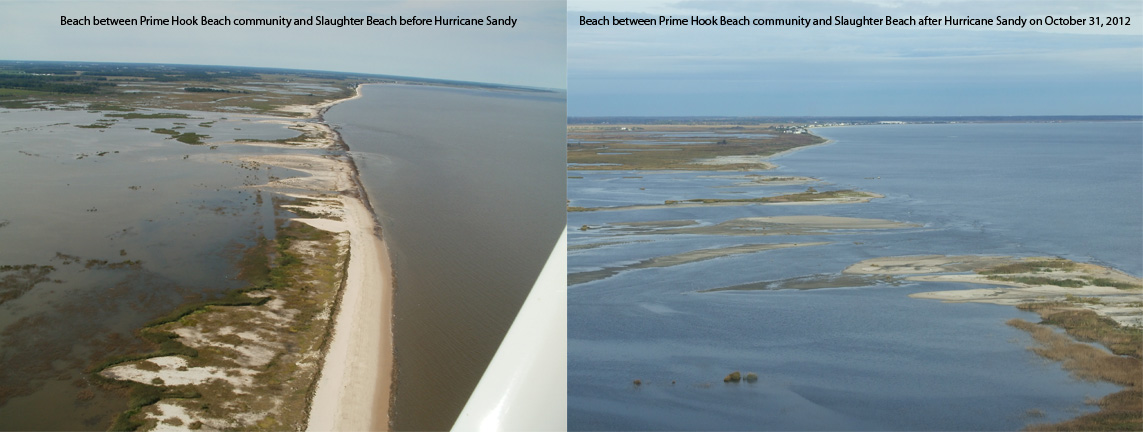
Before and after image of flooding caused by Hurricane Sandy at Prime Hook National Wildlife Refuge

By the afternoon of October 29, rainfall at Rehoboth Beach totaled 6.53 inches (166 mm). Other precipitation reports include nearly 7 inches (180 mm) at Indian River Inlet and more than 4 inches (100 mm) in Dover and Bear. At 4 p.m. on October 29, Delmarva Power reported on its website that more than 13,900 customers in Delaware and portions of the Eastern Shore of Maryland had lost electric service as high winds brought down trees and power lines. About 3,500 of those were in New Castle County, 2,900 were in Sussex, and more than 100 were in Kent County. Some residents in Kent and Sussex Counties experienced power outages that lasted up to nearly six hours. At the peak of the storm, more than 45,000 customers in Delaware were without power. The Delaware Memorial Bridge speed limit was reduced to 25 mph (40 km/h) and the two outer lanes in each direction were closed. Officials planned to close the span entirely if sustained winds exceeded 50 mph (80 km/h). A wind gust of 64 mph (103 km/h) was measured at Lewes just before 2:30 p.m. on October 29. Delaware Route 1 was closed due to water inundation between Dewey Beach and Fenwick Island. In Dewey Beach, flood waters were 1 to 2 feet (0.30 to 0.61 m) in depth. Following the impact in Delaware, President Barack Obama declared the entire state a federal disaster area, providing money and agencies for disaster relief in the wake of Hurricane Sandy.

===== New Jersey =====
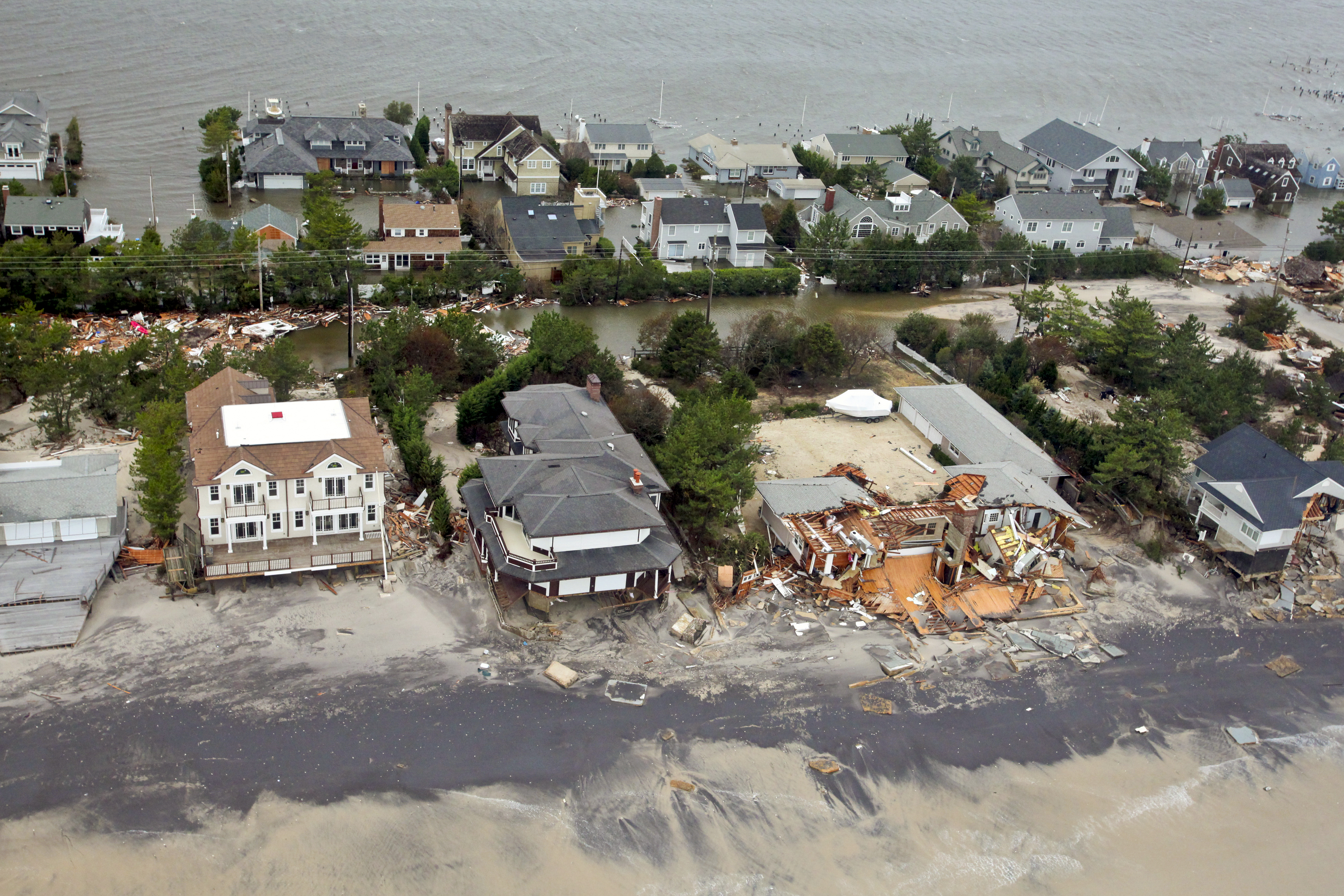
Damage to Mantoloking, New Jersey

A 50-foot (15 m) piece of the Atlantic City Boardwalk washed away. Half the city of Hoboken flooded; the city of 50,000 had to evacuate two of its fire stations, the EMS headquarters, and the hospital. With the city cut off from area hospitals and fire suppression mutual aid, the city's Mayor asked for National Guard help. In the early morning of October 30, authorities in Bergen County, New Jersey, evacuated residents after a berm overflowed and flooded several communities. Police Chief of Staff Jeanne Baratta said there were up to five feet (1.5 m) of water in the streets of Moonachie and Little Ferry. The state Office of Emergency Management said rescues were undertaken in Carlstadt. Baratta said the three towns had been "devastated" by the flood of water. At the peak of the storm, more than 2,600,000 customers were without power. There were 43 Hurricane Sandy-related deaths in the state of New Jersey. Damage in the state was estimated at $36.8 billion.

===== Pennsylvania =====
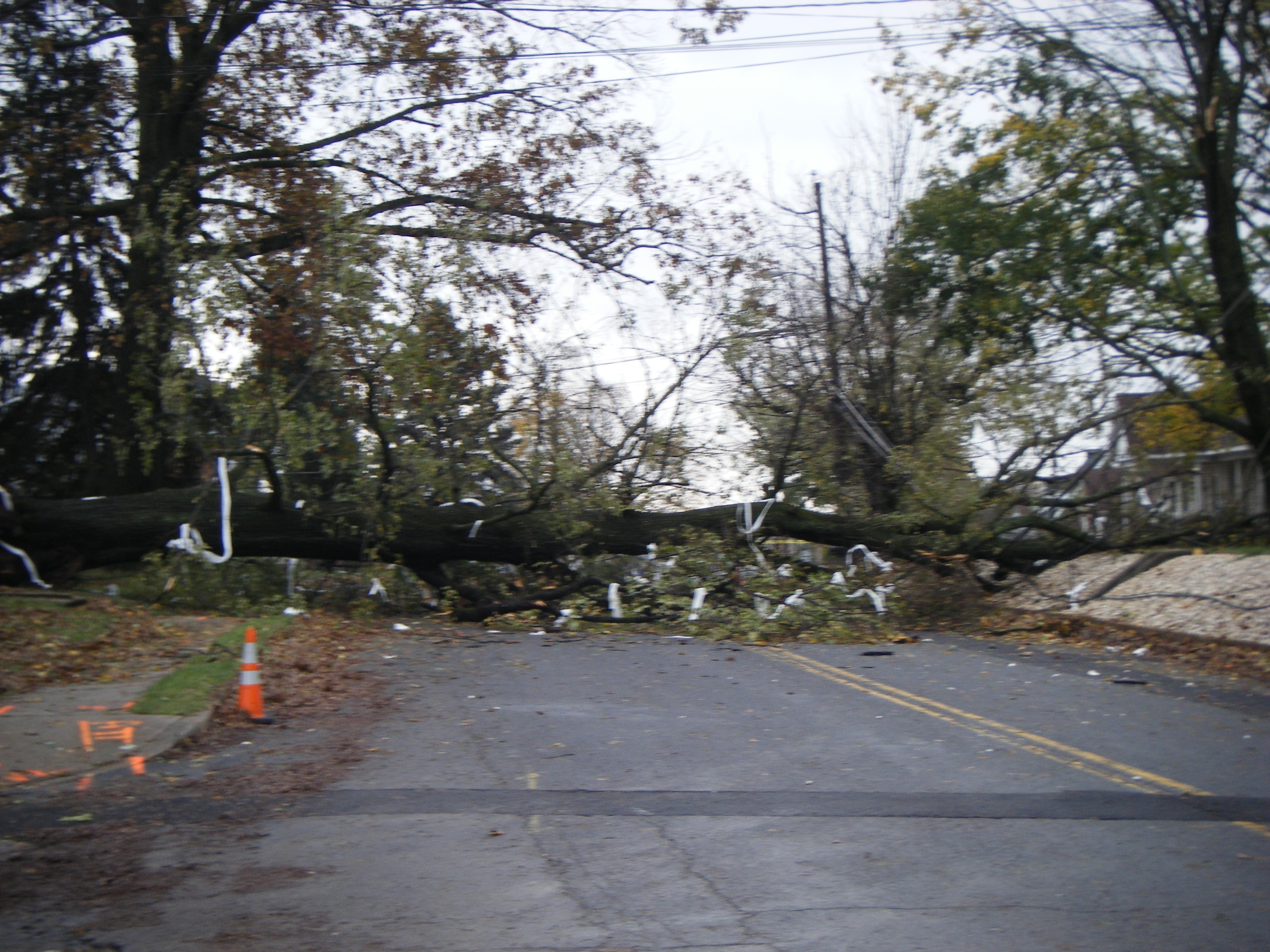
Downed tree in Kutztown, Pennsylvania

Philadelphia Mayor Michael Nutter said the city would have no mass transit operations on any lines October 30. All major highways in and around the city of Philadelphia were closed on October 29 during the hurricane, including Interstate 95, the Blue Route portion of Interstate 476, the Vine Street Expressway, Schuylkill Expressway (I-76), and the Roosevelt Expressway; U.S. Route 1. The highways reopened at 4 a.m. on October 30. The Delaware River Port Authority also closed its crossings over the Delaware River between Pennsylvania and New Jersey due to high winds: the Commodore Barry Bridge, the Walt Whitman Bridge, the Benjamin Franklin Bridge and the Betsy Ross Bridge. Trees and powerlines were downed throughout Altoona, and four buildings partially collapsed. The highest wind gust in the state's history was recorded in Allentown on late on October 29, where an 81-mile-per-hour (130 km/h) wind gust occurred. More than 1.2 million were left without power. The Pennsylvania Emergency Management Agency reported 14 deaths believed to be related to Sandy.

===== New York =====
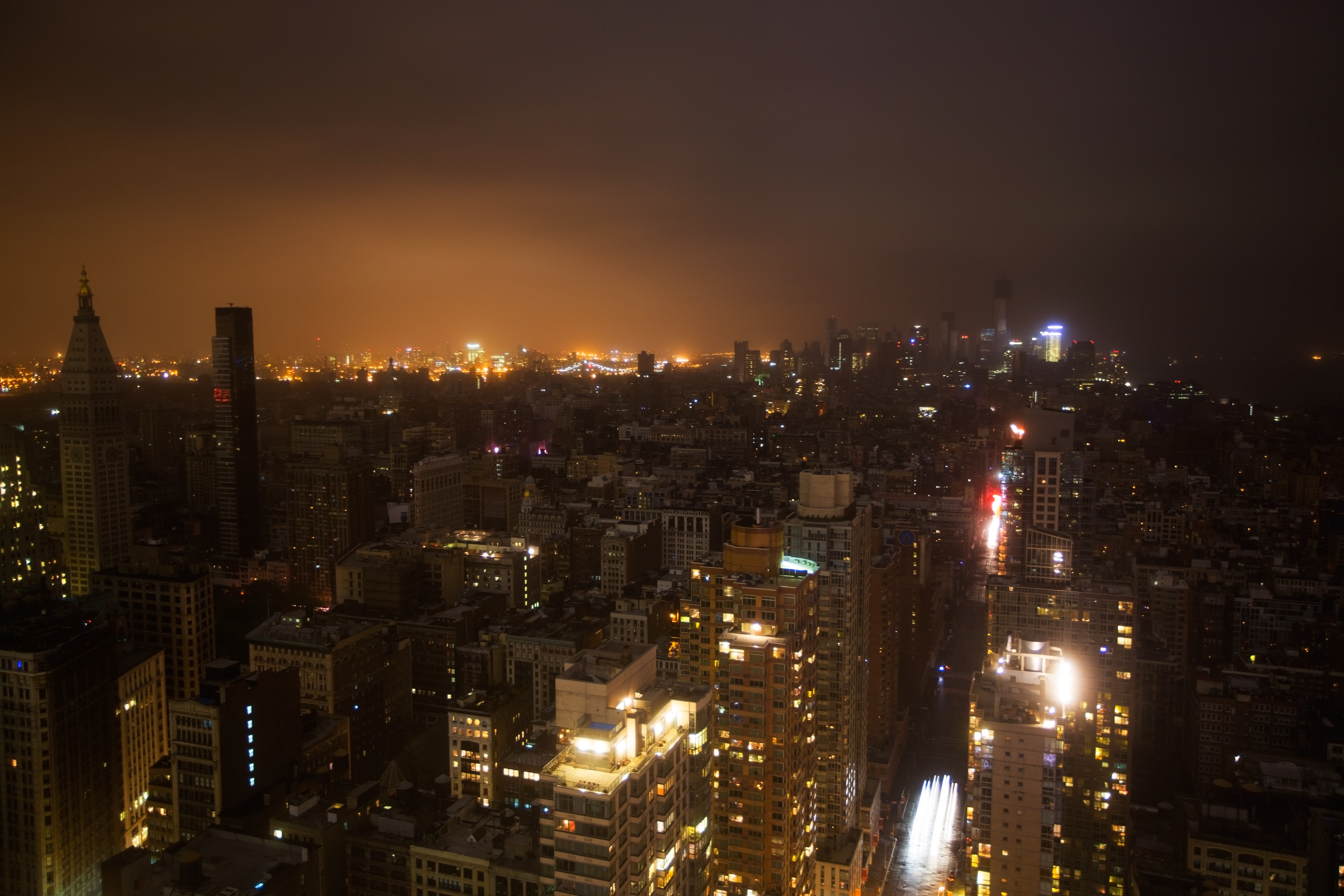
Manhattan suffered a widespread power outage during the storm.

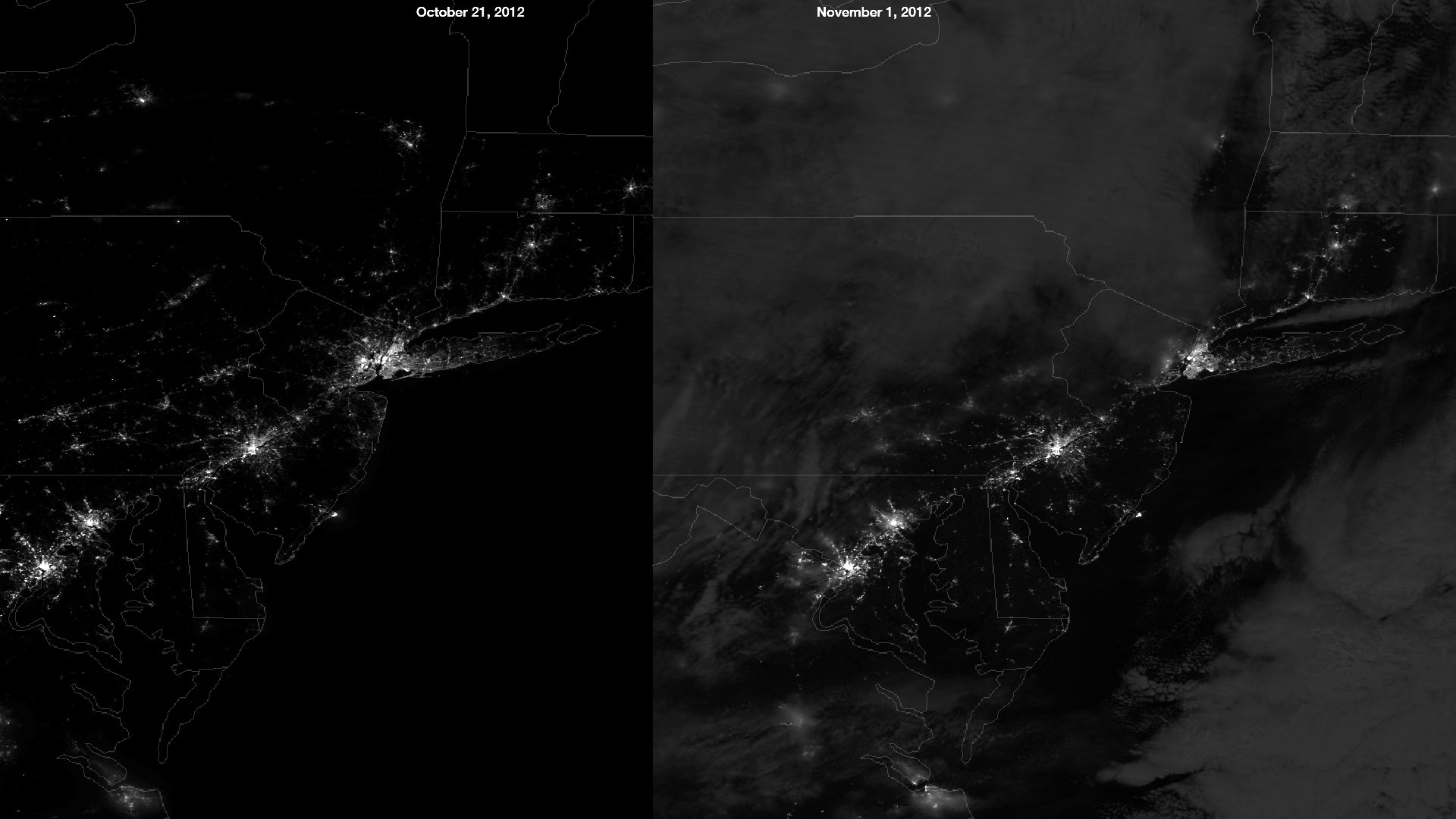
Suomi NPP satellite imagery showing the power outages in New York and New Jersey on November 1 compared to October 21.

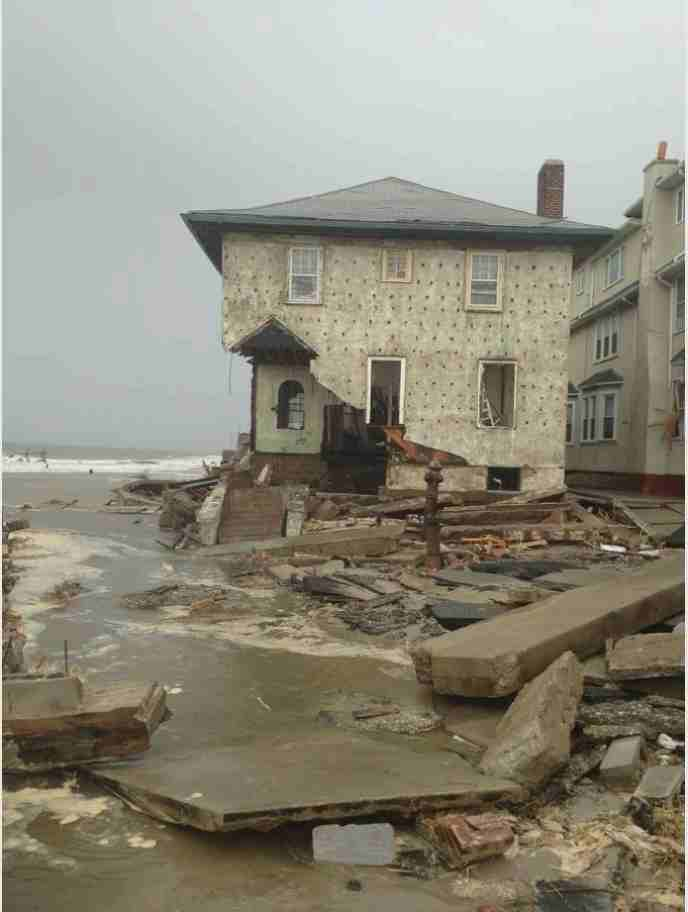
Damage from Hurricane Sandy to a house in Brooklyn, New York.

New York governor Andrew Cuomo called National Guard members to help in the state. Storm impacts in Upstate New York were much more limited than in New York City; there was some flooding and a few downed trees. Rochester area utilities reported slightly fewer than 19,000 customers without power, in seven counties. In the state as a whole, however, more than 2,000,000 customers were without power at the peak of the storm.

Mayor of New York City Michael Bloomberg announced that New York City public schools would be closed on Tuesday, October 30 and Wednesday, October 31, but they remained closed through Friday, November 2. The City University of New York and New York University canceled all classes and campus activities for October 30. The New York Stock Exchange was closed for trading for two days, the first weather closure of the exchange since 1985. It was also the first two-day weather closure since the Great Blizzard of 1888.

The East River overflowed its banks, flooding large sections of Lower Manhattan. Battery Park had a water surge of 13.88 ft. Seven subway tunnels under the East River were flooded. The Metropolitan Transportation Authority said that the destruction caused by the storm was the worst disaster in the 108-year history of the New York City subway system. Sea water flooded the Ground Zero construction site including the National September 11 Memorial and Museum. Over 10 billion gallons of raw and partially treated sewage were released by the storm, 94% of which went into waters in and around New York and New Jersey. More than 200 wastewater treatment plants and over 80 drinking water facilities along the coast of the Tri-State area had been damaged beyond function, with a statement from Governor Cuomo that damage in New York treatment plants alone could reach $1.1 billion. The resulting damage caused more than 10 billion gallons of raw sewage to be released into New York and New Jersey water sources. This contamination resulted in the shutting down of several drinking-water facilities. The contamination caused by this incident resulted in the EPA issuing a warning that all individuals should avoid coming into contact with the water in Newark Bay and New York Harbor, due to the increased presence of fecal coliform, a bacteria that is associated with human waste. Similar warnings were issued for water sources in both the Westchester and Yonkers areas. In addition, a four-story Chelsea building's facade crumbled and collapsed, leaving the interior on full display; however, no one was hurt by the falling masonry. The Atlantic Ocean storm surge also caused considerable flood damage to homes, buildings, roadways, boardwalks and mass transit facilities in low-lying coastal areas of the outer boroughs of Queens, Brooklyn and Staten Island.

After receiving many complaints that holding the marathon would divert needed resources, Mayor Bloomberg announced late afternoon November 2 that the New York City Marathon had been canceled. The event was to take place on Sunday, November 4. Marathon officials said that they did not plan to reschedule.

Gas shortages throughout the region led to an effort by the U.S. federal government to bring in gasoline and set up mobile truck distribution at which people could receive up to 10 gallons of gas, free of charge. This caused lines of up to 20 blocks long and was quickly suspended. On Thursday, November 8, Mayor Bloomberg announced odd-even rationing of gasoline would be in effect beginning November 9 until further notice.

On November 26, Governor Cuomo called Sandy "more impactful" than Hurricane Katrina, and estimated costs to New York at $42 billion. Approximately 100,000 residences on Long Island were destroyed or severely damaged, including 2,000 that were rendered uninhabitable. There were 53 Hurricane Sandy-related deaths in the state of New York. In 2016, the hurricane was determined to have been the worst to strike the New York City area since at least 1700.

==== New England ====
Wind gusts to 83 mph were recorded on outer Cape Cod and Buzzards Bay. Nearly 300,000 customers were without power in Massachusetts, and roads and buildings were flooded. Over 100,000 customers lost power in Rhode Island. Most of the damage was along the coastline, where some communities were flooded. Mount Washington, New Hampshire saw the strongest measured wind gust from the storm at 140 mph. Nearly 142,000 customers lost power in the state.

The flooding caused by Hurricane Sandy overwhelmed water treatment infrastructure on the northeast coast of the United States.

==== Appalachia and Midwest ====
===== West Virginia =====
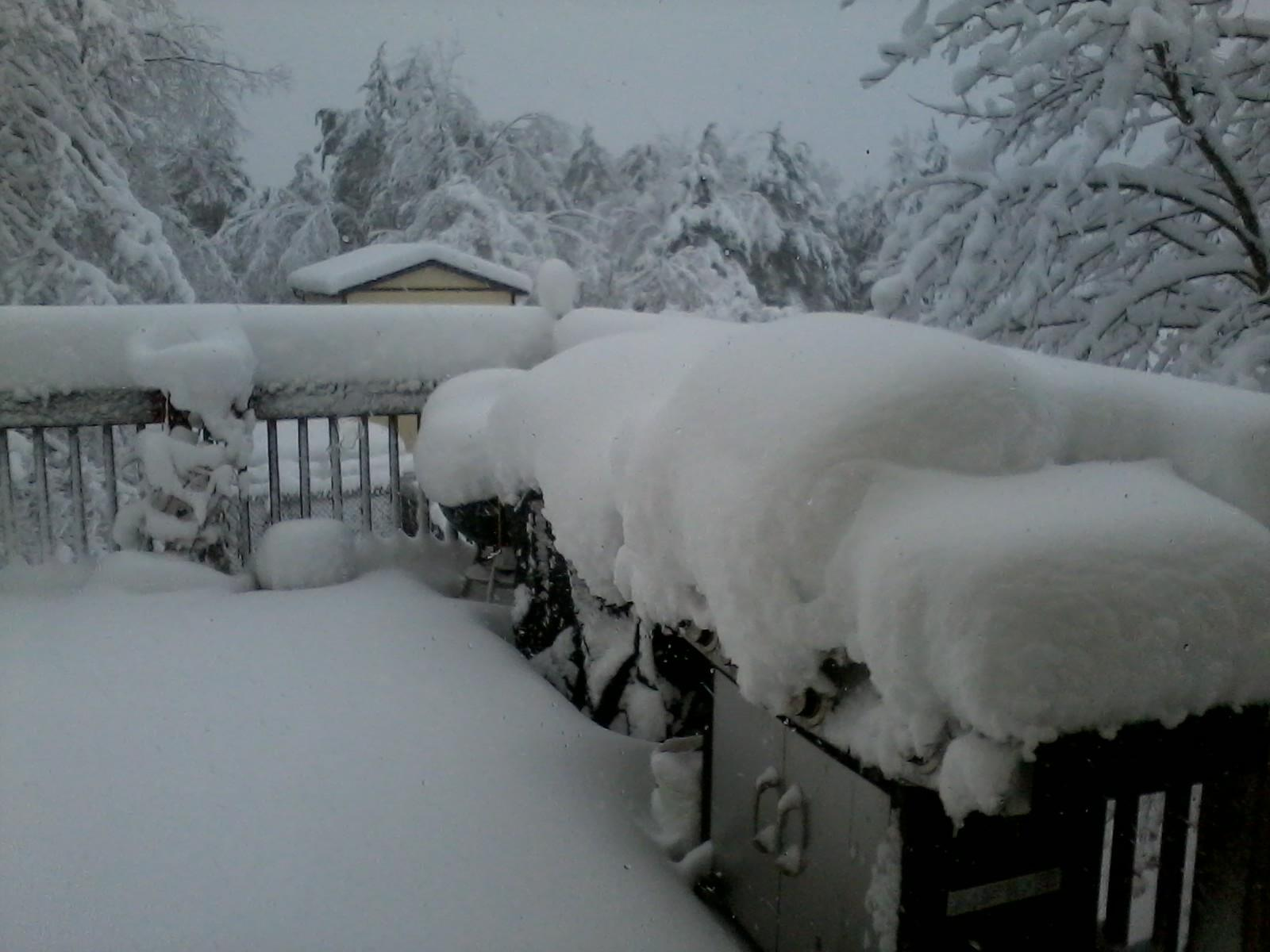
Snow from Hurricane Sandy in West Virginia

Sandy's rain became snow in the Appalachian Mountains, leading to blizzard conditions in some areas, especially West Virginia, when a tongue of dense and heavy Arctic air pushed south through the region. This would normally cause a Nor'easter, prompting some to dub Sandy a "nor'eastercane" or "Frankenstorm". There was 1–3 feet (30–91 cm) of snowfall in 28 of West Virginia's 55 counties. The highest snowfall accumulation was 36 inches (91 cm) near Richwood. Other significant totals include 32 inches (81 cm) in Snowshoe, 29 inches (74 cm) in Quinwood, and 28 inches (71 cm) in Davis, Flat Top, and Huttonsville. By the morning of October 31, there were still 36 roads closed due to downed trees, powerlines, and snow in the road. Approximately 271,800 customers lost power during the storm.

There were reports of collapsed buildings in several counties due to the sheer weight of the wet, heavy snow. Overall, there were seven fatalities related to Hurricane Sandy and its remnants in West Virginia, including John Rose Sr., the Republican candidate for the state's 47th district in the state legislature, who was killed in the aftermath of the storm by a falling tree limb broken off by the heavy snowfall. Governor Earl Ray Tomblin asked President Obama for a federal disaster declaration, and on October 30, President Obama approved a state of emergency declaration for the state.

===== Ohio =====
Wind gusts at Cleveland Burke Lakefront Airport were reported at 68 miles per hour (109 km/h). On October 30, hundreds of school districts canceled or delayed school across the state with at least 250,000 homes and businesses without power. Damage was reported across the state including the Rock and Roll Hall of Fame which lost parts of its siding. Snow was reported in some parts of eastern Ohio and south of Cleveland. Snow and icy roads also were reported south of Columbus.

===== Michigan =====
The US Department of Energy reported that more than 120,000 customers lost power in Michigan as a result of the storm. The National Weather Service said that waves up to 23 feet (7.0 m) high were reported on southern Lake Huron.

===== Kentucky =====
More than one foot (300 mm) of snow fell in eastern Kentucky as Sandy merged with an Arctic front. Winter warnings in Harlan, Letcher, and Pike County were put into effect until October 31.

===== Tennessee =====
Mount Le Conte, Tennessee, in Great Smoky Mountains National Park, was blanketed with 32 inches (81 cm) of snow, an October record.

=== Canada ===
The remnants of Sandy produced high winds along Lake Huron and Georgian Bay, where gusts were measured at 105 kilometres per hour (65 mph). A 121 km/h (75 mph) gust was measured on top of the Bluewater Bridge. One woman died after being hit by a piece of flying debris in Toronto. At least 145,000 customers across Ontario lost power, and a Bluewater Power worker was electrocuted in Sarnia while working to restore power. Around 49,000 homes and businesses lost power in Quebec during the storm, with nearly 40,000 of those in the Laurentides region of the province, as well as more than 4,000 customers in the Eastern Townships and 1,700 customers in Montreal. Hundreds of flights were canceled. Around 14,000 customers in Nova Scotia lost power during the height of the storm. The Insurance Bureau of Canada's preliminary damage estimate was over $100 million for the nation.

== Aftermath ==
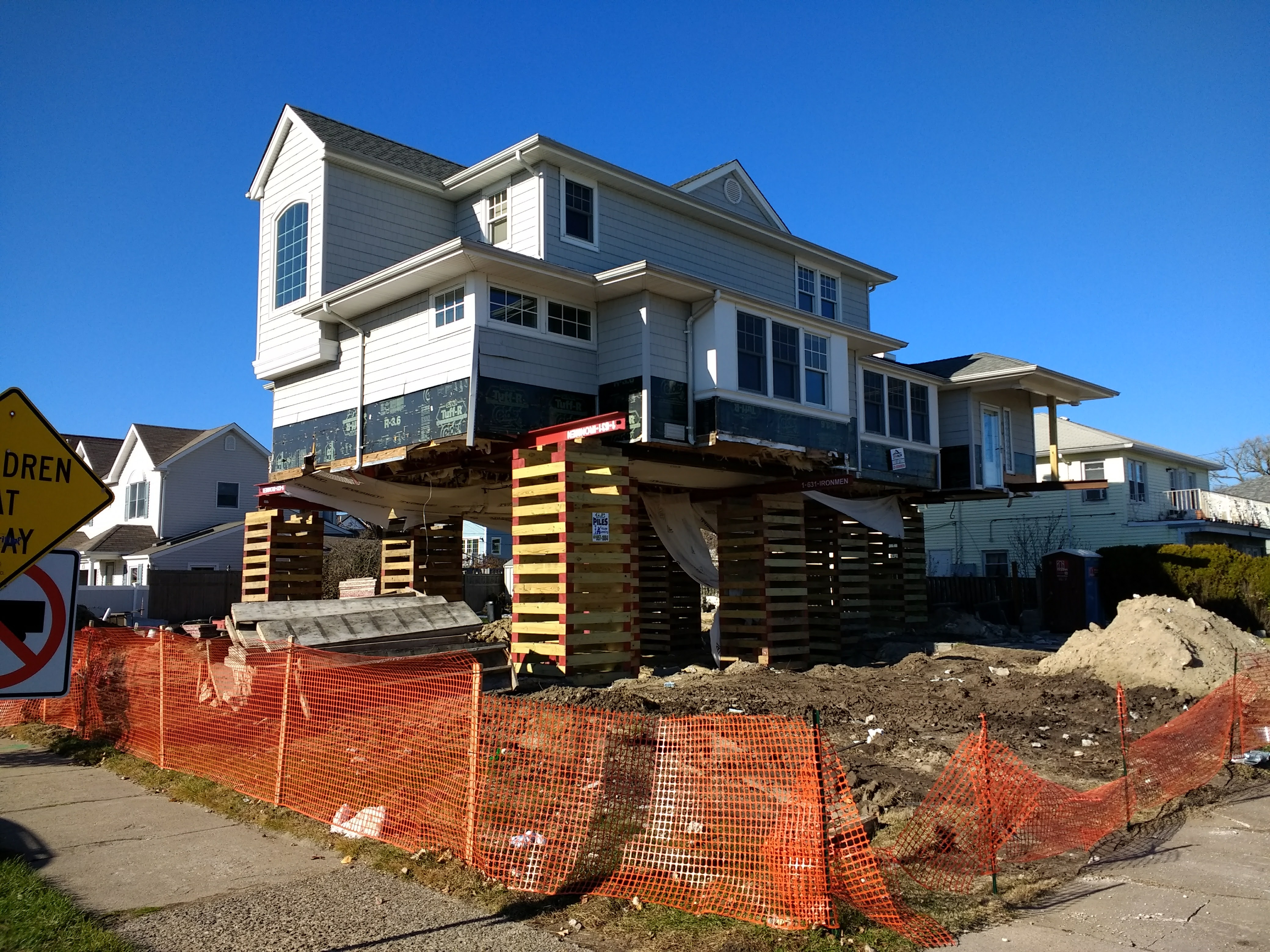
In Long Beach, New York, five years after the storm, homes were still being raised—lifted on temporary pilings so that permanent foundations could be put in.

=== Relief efforts ===
Several media organizations contributed to the immediate relief effort: Disney–ABC Television Group held a "Day of Giving" on Monday, November 5, raising $17 million on their television stations for the American Red Cross and NBC raised $23 million during their Hurricane Sandy: Coming Together telethon the same day. On October 31, 2012, News Corporation donated $1 million to relief efforts in the New York metropolitan area. As of December 2013, the NGO Hurricane Sandy New Jersey Relief Fund had distributed much of the funding raised in New Jersey.

On November 6, the United Nations and World Food Programme promised humanitarian aid to at least 500,000 people in Santiago de Cuba.

On December 12, 2012, the 12-12-12: The Concert for Sandy Relief took place at Madison Square Garden in New York City. Various television channels in the United States and internationally aired the four-hour concert which was expected to reach over 1 billion people worldwide, featuring many famous performers including Bon Jovi, Eric Clapton, Dave Grohl, Billy Joel, and Alicia Keys. Web sites including Fuse.tv, MTV.com, YouTube, and the sites of AOL and Yahoo! planned to stream the performance.

The U.S. Government mobilized several agencies and departments to mitigate the effects of the Hurricane in the most afflicted areas. The response to the storm on the part of the government was of particular urgency owing to the possible fallout of a poor response on the part of the Obama administration during the upcoming U.S. presidential elections. These sentiments were characterized in the President's speech in the days following the impact, stating the government's response was "not going to tolerate any red tape. We're not going to tolerate any bureaucracy".

Anticipating the destruction of the Atlantic storm, states on the U.S. East Coast, especially in heavily populated regions like in the New York metropolitan area, began to prepare. As the tropical depression strengthened to a hurricane, the Department of Defense formed Joint Task Force Sandy on October 22, 2012. Gathering humanitarian supplies and disaster recovery equipment, the DOD prepared to carry out DSCA (Defense Support of Civil Authorities) operations across the eastern seaboard. In the aftermath of the calamity, thousands of military personnel provided vital assistance to affected communities. On the first night of the aftermath, 12,000 National Guard members across the East Coast worked to assuage the destruction. President Obama mandated the Defense Logistics Agency to supply over 5 million gallons Department of Energy-owned ultra-low sulfur diesel.

On December 28, 2012, the United States Senate approved an emergency Hurricane Sandy relief bill to provide $60 billion for US states affected by Sandy, but the House in effect postponed action until the next session which began January 3 by adjourning without voting on the bill. On January 4, 2013, House leaders pledged to vote on a flood insurance bill and an aid package by January 15. On January 28, the Senate passed the $50.5 billion Sandy aid bill by a count of 62–36. which President Obama signed into law January 29.

In January 2013, The New York Times reported that those affected by the hurricane were still struggling to recover.

In June 2013, NY Governor Andrew Cuomo set out to centralize recovery and rebuilding efforts in impacted areas of New York State by establishing the Governor's Office of Storm Recovery (GOSR). He aimed to address communities' most urgent needs, and to identify innovative and enduring solutions to strengthen the State's infrastructure and critical systems. Operating under the umbrella of New York Rising, GOSR utilized approximately $3.8 billion in flexible funding made available by the U.S. Department of Housing & Urban Development's (HUD) Community Development Block Grant Disaster Recovery (CDBG-DR) program to concentrate aid in four main areas: housing, small business, infrastructure, and the community reconstruction.

On December 6, 2013, an analysis of Federal Emergency Management Agency data showed that fewer than half of those affected who requested disaster recovery assistance had received any, and a total of 30,000 residents of New York and New Jersey remained displaced.

In March 2014, Newsday reported, that 17 months after the hurricane people displaced from rental units on Long Island faced unique difficulties due to lack of affordable rental housing and delays in housing program implementations by New York State. Close to 9,000 rental units on Long Island were damaged by Hurricane Sandy in October 2012, and Hurricane Irene and Tropical Storm Lee in 2011 per the NY State Governor's Office of Storm Recovery (GOSR). New York State officials said that additional assistance would soon be available from the HUD's Community Development Block Grant funds via the New York Rising program. On March 15, 2014, a group of those who remained displaced by the hurricane organized a protest at the Nassau Legislative building in Mineola, New York, to raise awareness of their frustration with the timeline for receiving financial assistance from the New York Rising program.

As of March 2014, the GOSR released a press statement, that the New York Rising Community Reconstruction Program had distributed more than $280 million in payments to 6,388 homeowners for damage from Hurricane Sandy, Hurricane Irene or Tropical Storm Lee. Every eligible homeowner who had applied by January 20, 2014, had been issued a check for home reconstruction, including over 4,650 Nassau residents for over $201 million and over 1,350 Suffolk residents for over $65 million. The state also had made offers over $293 million to buy out homes of 709 homeowners.

=== Political impact ===
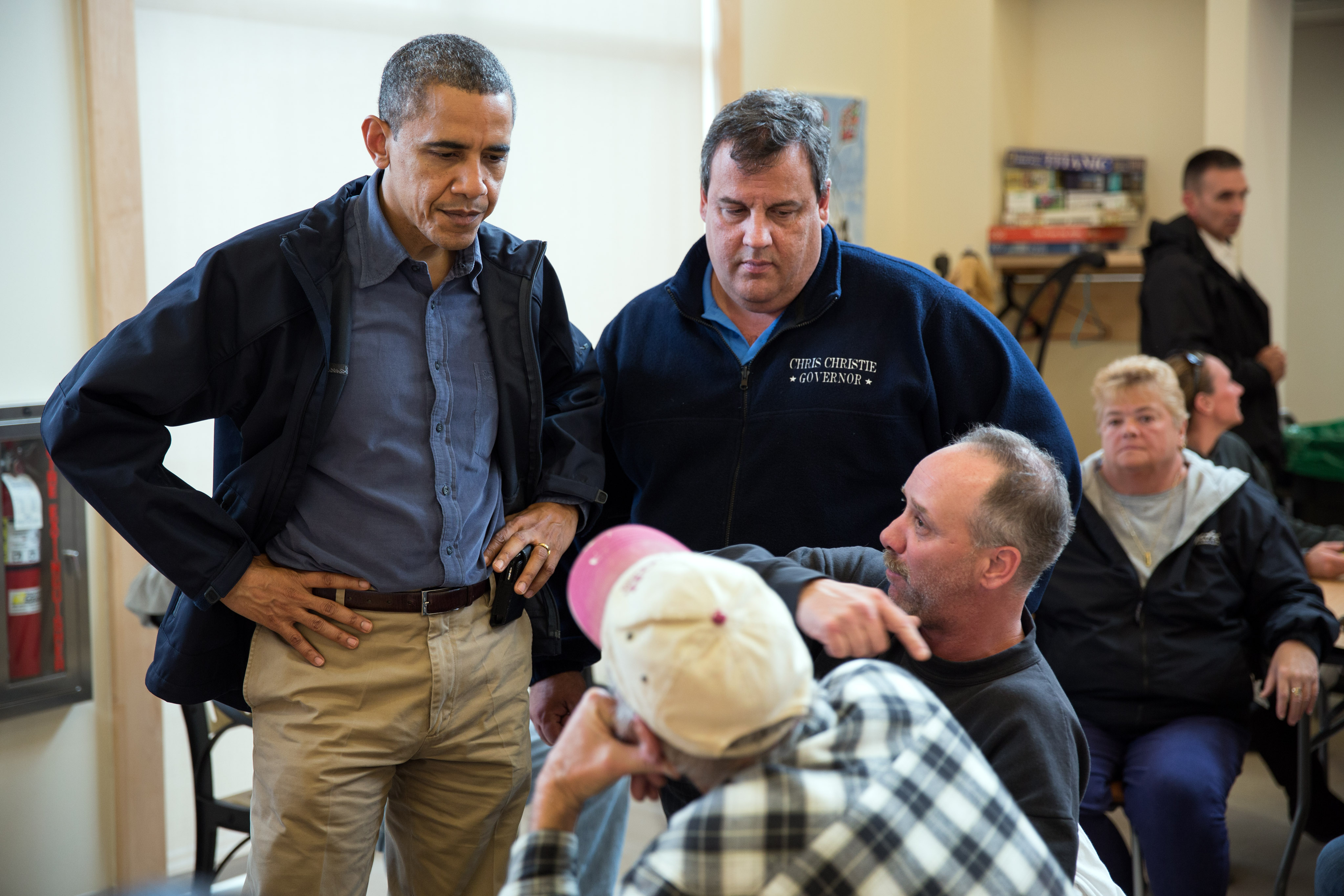
President Barack Obama and New Jersey Governor Chris Christie talking to storm victims in Brigantine

Hurricane Sandy sparked much political commentary. Many scientists said warming oceans and greater atmospheric moisture were intensifying storms while rising sea levels were worsening coastal effects. November 2012 Representative Henry Waxman of California, the top Democrat of the House Energy and Commerce Committee, requested a hearing in the lame duck session on links between climate change and Hurricane Sandy. Some news outlets labeled the storm the October surprise of the 2012 United States Presidential election, while Democrats and Republicans accused each other of politicizing the storm.

The storm hit the United States one week before its general United States elections, and affected the presidential campaign, local and state campaigns in storm-damaged areas. New Jersey Governor Chris Christie, one of Mitt Romney's leading supporters, praised President Barack Obama and his reaction to the hurricane, and toured storm-damaged areas of his state with the president. It was reported at the time that Sandy might affect elections in several states, especially by curtailing early voting. The Economist wrote, "the weather is supposed to clear up well ahead of election day, but the impact could be felt in the turnout of early voters." ABC News predicted this might be offset by a tendency to clear roads and restore power more quickly in urban areas. The storm ignited a debate over whether Republican presidential nominee Mitt Romney in 2011 proposed to eliminate the Federal Emergency Management Agency (FEMA). The next day the Romney campaign promised to keep FEMA funded, but did not explain what other parts of the federal budget it would cut to pay for it. Beyond the election, National Defense Magazine said Sandy "might cause a rethinking (in the USA) of how climate change threatens national security".

In his news conference on November 14, 2012, President Obama said, "we can't attribute any particular weather event to climate change. What we do know is the temperature around the globe is increasing faster than was predicted even 10 years ago. We do know that the Arctic ice cap is melting faster than was predicted even five years ago. We do know that there have been extraordinarily — there have been an extraordinarily large number of severe weather events here in North America, but also around the globe. And I am a firm believer that climate change is real, that it is impacted by human behavior and carbon emissions. And as a consequence, I think we've got an obligation to future generations to do something about it."

On January 30, 2015, days after the U.S. Army Corps of Engineers released a post-Sandy report examining flood risks for 31,200 miles (50,200 km) of the North Atlantic coast, President Obama issued an executive order directing federal agencies, state and local governments drawing federal funds to adopt stricter building and siting standards to reflect scientific projections that future flooding will be more frequent and intense due to climate change.

=== Financial markets impact ===
Power outages and flooding in the area closed the New York Stock Exchange and other financial markets on both October 29 and 30, a weather-related closure that last happened in 1888. When markets reopened on October 31, investors were relieved that it closed relatively flat that day. A week later, the National Association of Insurance Commissioners Capital Markets Bureau noted a slight uptick in the market (0.8%) and suggested that the negative economic impact of Hurricane Sandy was offset by the expected positive impacts of rebuilding.

=== Infrastructure impact ===
The destruction of physical infrastructure as a result of Sandy cost impacted states, including New York and New Jersey, tens of billions of dollars. EQECAT, a risk-modeling company that focuses on catastrophes, approximated that impacted regions lost between $30 billion to $50 billion in economic activity. The economic loss was attributed to the massive power outages, liquid fuel shortages, and a near shutdown of the region's transportation system.

- Energy: Roughly 8.5 million customers were impacted due to power outages, including many businesses that were hard-pressed to deliver products and services in a timely manner. Breaks in gas lines also caused fires in many locations, prompting explosions and destruction of a large number of residences. Locating gas and diesel fuel proved difficult immediately after Sandy hit, which harmed transportation access for many people. The impairment of the ability to obtain fuel was due to flooding damage in crucial terminals and harbors in areas of New Jersey bordering the Arthur Kill. The shortage of fuel held up first responders as well as other response and recovery officials. Therefore, portable generators remained unutilized, resulting in long lines at fueling stations while individuals were unable to differentiate between the stations that did not hold power from the gas stations that were operational.
- Communications: Telecommunications infrastructure was heavily disrupted, impacting millions of people and thousands of businesses, destabilizing the economy of one of the biggest cities in the world. The Federal Communications Commission (FCC) found that roughly 25% of cell towers across 10 states were out of service at the peak of the storm.
- Green Infrastructure: Hurricane Sandy's storm surge caused erosion of the beaches and dunes, island breaches, and overwash along the coast of New England down all the way to Florida. Flooding along the coast generated substantial erosion of previous natural infrastructure, flooding of wetland habitats, coastal dune destruction or erosion, decimation of coastal lakes, and novel inlet creation.

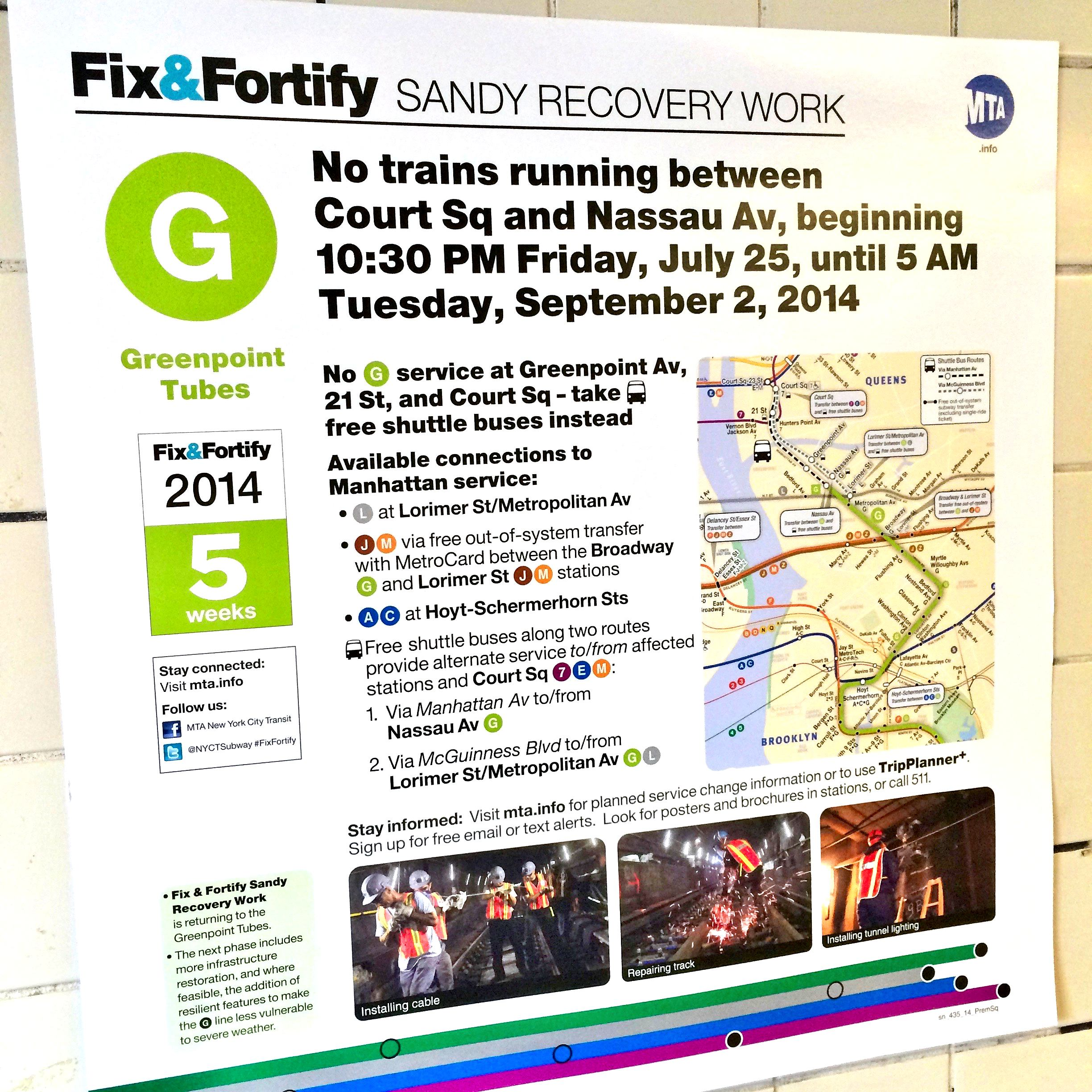
A 2014 sign warned NYC commuters that the G train would shut down for repair due to 2012 Hurricane Sandy flooding. Several subway lines flooded by Hurricane Sandy would eventually require saltwater corrosion repair.

- Transportation: Throughout the history of the country, the nation had not witnessed a worse disaster for public transit systems, including buses, subway, and commuter rail, than when Sandy struck. The morning after the storm hit, on October 30, 2012, more than half of the country's daily public transportation riders were unable to commute due to inoperable service. The New York City subway system was shut down two days prior to the storm due to necessary precautions and remained closed through November 1. During that short amount of time, one of the world's largest financial centers experienced immense traffic jams. Those who were able to arrive at work experienced commutes of several hours. Eight New York City subway tunnels were flooded due to a seawater breach which flowed through the Brooklyn-Battery Tunnel, impacting various transportation systems throughout the region.
- Stormwater Management and Wastewater Treatment Systems: There was a massive failure in wastewater treatment facilities all around the mid-Atlantic coast due to floodwaters, large storm runoff, wind damage, and electricity loss. The region's waterways were hit with billions of gallons of raw and partially treated sewage, adversely affecting the health of the public, as well as ocean habitats and other important resources. There was also a public health concern about the threat of contaminated water filling the pipes and wells that supplied potable water to large parts of the region. Large water utility companies experienced power outages, disrupting their ability to provide safe drinking water. Advisories had to be sent out to many parts of New York and New Jersey for customers to warn them of the potential of their water being contaminated. The "boil water" advisories were later lifted, however, when it was proven that none of the water was contaminated or held the potential for any ill effects.
- Public Medical Facilities and Schools: A variety of New York City hospitals and other medical facilities, including the Bellevue Medical Center and Coney Island hospital, were shut down as a result of flooding from the storm. In many parts of the hospitals, there was considerable damage to research, medical, and electrical equipment which was located on lower floors for ease of access. In New Jersey, medical facilities were also severely affected. In sum, the hospitals in the state reported an estimated $68 million in damage. Hudson County had to force closure due to the extensive damage done by the hurricane. Hurricane Sandy also caused schools to close for about a week on average immediately following the storm. During the period of closure, schools attempted to regain control of electrical operations that were impaired by the aftermath.

=== Insurance fraud claims ===
Thousands of homeowners were denied their flood insurance claims based upon fraudulent engineers' reports, according to the whistleblowing efforts of Andrew Braum, an engineer who claimed that at least 175 of his more than 180 inspections were doctored. As a result, a class-action racketeering lawsuit has been filed against several insurance companies and their contract engineering firms. As of 2015, the Federal Emergency Management Agency planned to review all flood insurance claims.

=== Baby boom ===
New Jersey hospitals saw a spike in births nine months after Sandy, causing some to believe that there was a post-Sandy baby boom. The Monmouth Medical Center saw a 35% jump, and two other hospitals saw 20% increases. An expert stated that post-storm births that year were higher than in past disasters.

=== Retirement ===
Because of the severe damage and number of deaths caused by the storm in several countries, the name Sandy was later retired by the World Meteorological Organization in April 2013, and will never be used again for a North Atlantic tropical cyclone. The name was replaced with Sara for the 2018 season.

== Media coverage ==
As Hurricane Sandy approached the United States, forecasters and journalists gave it several different unofficial names, at first related to its projected snow content, then to its proximity to Halloween, and eventually to the overall size of the storm. Early nicknames included "Snowicane Sandy" and "Snor'eastercane Sandy". The most popular Halloween-related nickname was "Frankenstorm", coined by Jim Cisco, a forecaster at the Hydrometeorological Prediction Center. CNN banned the use of the term, saying it trivialized the destruction.

The severe and widespread damage the storm caused in the United States, as well as its unusual merger with a frontal system, resulted in the nicknaming of the hurricane "Superstorm Sandy" by the media, public officials, and several organizations, including U.S. government agencies. This persisted as the most common nickname well into 2013. The term was also embraced by climate change proponents as a term for the new type of storms caused by global warming, while other writers used the term but maintained that it was too soon to blame the storm on climate change. Meanwhile, Popular Science called it "an imaginary scare-term that exists exclusively for shock value".

== See also ==
- 1938 New England hurricane
- Hurricane Bob (1991)
- 1991 Perfect Storm
- Hurricane Irene (2011)
- Typhoon Jongdari – A Pacific typhoon in 2018 which executed a similar turn into Japan
- Tropical Storm Fay (2020)
- Hurricane Zeta (2020)
- Hurricane Ida (2021)
- Hurricane Sandy IRS tax deduction
- List of Atlantic hurricane records
- List of Category 3 Atlantic hurricanes
- List of Cuba hurricanes
- List of New Jersey hurricanes
- List of New York hurricanes
- Superstorm
- Timeline of the 2012 Atlantic hurricane season
