= Storm Lee =

Storm Lee may refer to:

- Storm Lee, a contestant in The X Factor (British TV series) series 7
- List of storms named Lee
