= List of storms named Lee =

The name Lee has been used for eight tropical cyclones worldwide: four in the Atlantic Ocean, three in the West Pacific Ocean, and one in the Australian region.

In the Atlantic, where Lee replaced Lenny on the naming lists:

- Tropical Storm Lee (2005) – did not affect land
- Tropical Storm Lee (2011) – made landfall in Louisiana and later caused historic flooding in the Northeastern United States
- Hurricane Lee (2017) – a Category 3 hurricane that did not affect land
- Hurricane Lee (2023) – a Category 5 hurricane that made landfall in Atlantic Canada as an extratropical cyclone

In the West Pacific:

- Typhoon Lee (1981) (T8129, 29W, Dinang) – a Category 2-equivalent typhoon that caused 188 fatalities in the Philippines
- Tropical Storm Lee (1985) (T8509, 09W, Huling) – a severe tropical storm that affected the Ryukyu Islands and Korea
- Tropical Storm Lee (1988) (T8822, 18W, Ningning) – a severe tropical storm

In the Australian region:

- Cyclone Lee (2007) – a Category 2 tropical cyclone that later became Cyclone Ariel in the South-West Indian Ocean

== See also ==
- Hurricane Li (1994) – a Central Pacific Ocean tropical cyclone with a similar name
