= List of Adelphi University people =

Notable people of Adelphi University, a private university in Garden City, New York, include prominent politicians, entertainers, athletes, scientists and others.

== Alumni ==
- Joe Abbenda (b. 1939) – former Mr America and Mr Universe
- Chris Armas (b. 1972) – professional soccer player, Chicago Fire of Major League Soccer and Adelphi women's soccer coach
- Michael Balboni (b. 1959) – deputy secretary for Public Safety for the State of New York
- Bob Beamon (b. 1946) – track and field athlete, world record holder in long jump
- Justin Vivian Bond – actor, cabaret singer, named MacArthur Fellow 2024
- Stephen Book - director, actor, acting teacher
- Ron Bruder – entrepreneur who runs Middle East education non-profits, named on the Time 100
- Dave Cayemitte – former soccer player, financial analyst
- Melanie Chartoff – actress and comedienne
- Linda Cimino – college basketball coach
- Chuck Connors – athlete and actor
- Nick Cummings – Ph.D., past president of the American Psychological Association, founding board chairman of Care Integra, and author
- Chuck D (Carlton Ridenhour; b. 1960) – musician, author, lecturer, founder and frontman of the hip-hop group Public Enemy
- Gary Dell'Abate ("Baba Booey") (b. 1961) – producer of The Howard Stern Show
- Vyvyan Donner – fashion editor, film director, screenwriter, theatrical costume designer and caricaturist
- Hazel Dukes – civil rights activist
- Meredith Eaton-Gilden – psychotherapist and actress
- Paul Ekman – psychologist
- Clara Fasano – sculptor
- Flavor Flav – rapper, member of rap group Public Enemy
- Ida M. Flynn (1942–2004) – computer scientist, textbook author, and professor
- John Forslund – television play-by-play announcer for the Seattle Kraken of the NHL
- Karen Fraction – Broadway dancer and actress
- Charles J. Fuschillo Jr. – New York State Senator, 8th District
- Arie Gill-Glick – Israeli Olympic runner
- Malika Grayson – engineer, speaker, and author
- Wes Green – professional lacrosse player, Los Angeles Riptide of Major League Lacrosse, and San Jose Stealth of National Lacrosse League
- Alexander Greendale – playwright and civic leader
- Sean Hannity – Fox News host
- Randee Heller – actress known for roles in Soap, The Karate Kid, and Mad Men
- Alice Hoffman – author
- Earlene Hill Hooper – New York State Assemblywoman, 18th District
- Lucas Iverson – actor known for television roles in The Gilded Age (TV series) and The Pitt
- Elizabeth Rhodes Jackson (1875–1955), editor and children's writer
- Jonathan Larson – creator of the Broadway musical Rent
- Michael Lindsay – actor and voice artist
- Gee Malik Linton – director and screenwriter
- Suzanne Luna – producer and director on The Ellen DeGeneres Show
- Leona Marlin-Romeo – 5th prime minister of Sint Maarten
- Gregory W. Meeks – congressman from New York, 6th District
- Edward J. Megarr – United States Marine Corps major general
- Sal Mineo – actor, Academy Award nominee
- Donna Orender (née Geils; born 1957) – women's pro basketball league all-star and former WNBA president
- Carmen Ortiz – former U.S. attorney for the District of Massachusetts
- Billy Phillips – professional soccer player and coach
- Chad Prince (b. 1979) – professional soccer player and coach
- Carolynn Reid-Wallace (b. 1942) – 13th president of Fisk University (2001–2003); assistant secretary of education for postsecondary education (1991–1993)
- Ron Robinson – chemist
- Todd Robinson – director, screenwriter
- Dinelia Rosa – psychologist and professor
- Rony Schneider – Israeli professional soccer player
- Erin Stern – IFBB fitness professional and figure competitor
- Gary Sullivan – USL professional soccer player, Long Island Rough Riders
- Helen Rand Thayer (1863–1935), social reformer
- Rebecca Tobey – sculptor
- Edolphus Towns (b. 1934) – congressman from New York, 10th District
- Al Trautwig – sports announcer, member of the Adelphi Athletics Hall of Fame
- Mary L. Trump – psychologist and author, niece and critic of Donald Trump
- Nicholas Turturro – actor
- Steven Vincent – Broadway choreographer, dancer, and teacher
- Ruth Fanshaw Waldo – advertising executive, member of the Adelphi University board of trustees, namesake of Waldo Hall
- Max Weinberg (b. 1951) – drummer and television personality
- Isuri Wijesundara – actress
- Robert B. Willumstad – chairman and CEO, American International Group
- Mike Windischmann (b. 1965) – soccer, captain of the 1990 United States World Cup team
- Theresa Wolfson (1897–1972) – labor economist and educator, won the John Dewey Award of the League for Industrial Democracy
- Jacqueline Woodson (b. 1963) – author of children's literature, named MacArthur Fellow 2020
- John D. Wren – president, CEO, and chairman of the Omnicom Group
- Roby Young (b. 1942) – Israeli international soccer player, and captain of Hapoel Haifa

== Faculty ==
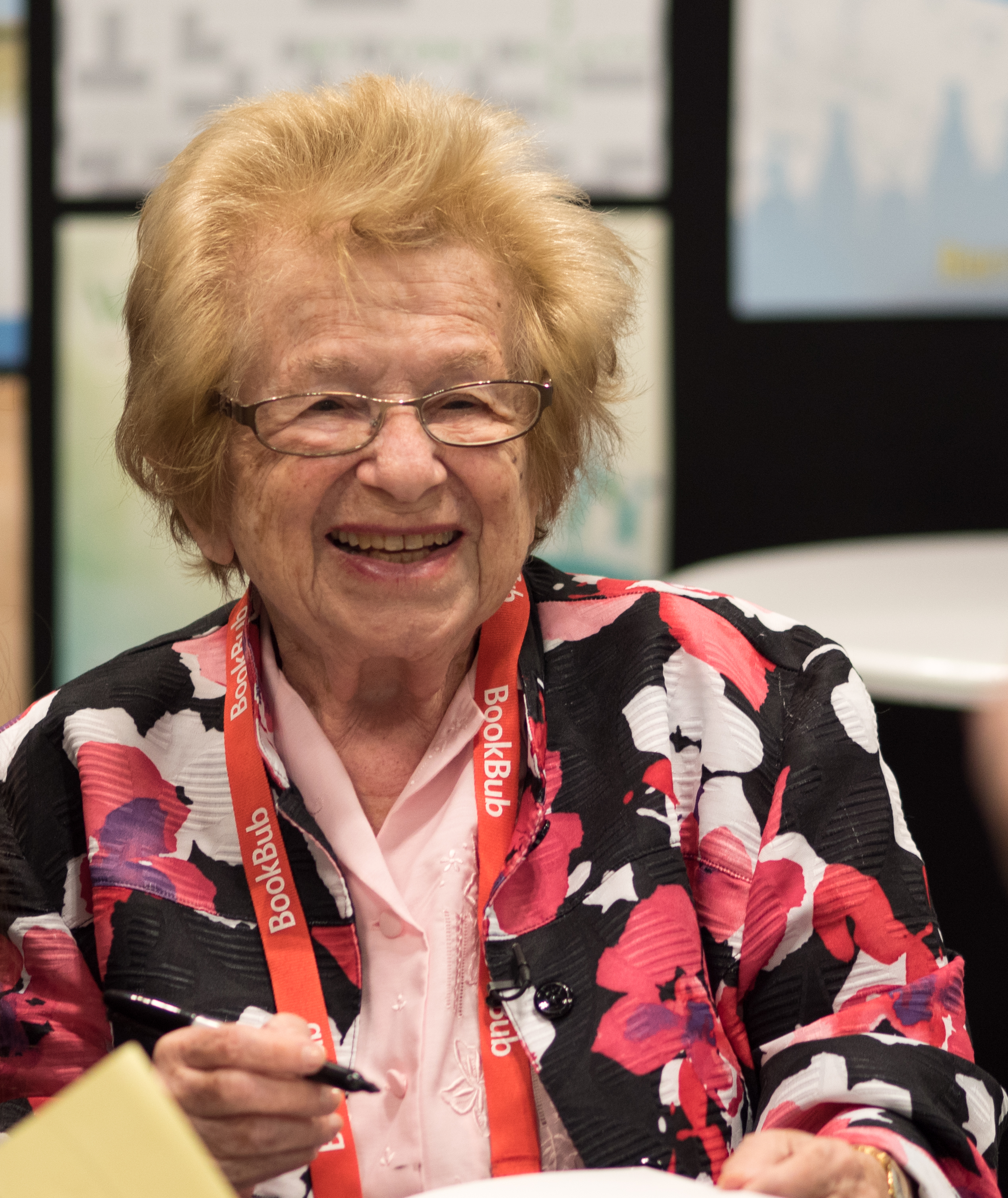
Ruth Westheimer

- Jacques P. Barber – dean and professor of Psychology
- Al Davis (1929–2011) – former line coach for the Adelphi College football team 1950–51
- Eugene Hecht (b. 1938) – physicist and author of a standard textbook in optics
- Loren Hightower (1927–2017) – dancer, Metropolitan Ballet, American Ballet Theatre, and Agnes de Mille Dance Theatre; regular performer with the Metropolitan Opera and Broadway musicals
- Allen Krebs – sacked for expressing political views in class and went on to found the Free University of New York
- William Cranston Lawton (1853–1941) – professor of Greek
- Jerry March (1929–1997) – organic chemist and professor of chemistry; authored March's Advanced Organic Chemistry text
- Paul Mattick Jr. (b. 1944) – professor and chair of philosophy. Author of Business as Usual: The Economic Crisis and the Failure of Capitalism. Son of Paul Mattick Sr.
- Paul Moravec – 2004 Pulitzer Prize winner in music composition
- Frances Perkins – professor of sociology, Labor Secretary under Franklin D. Roosevelt
- Lawrence Raphael – professor of communication sciences and disorders
- Ruth Westheimer (born Karola Siegel, 1928; known as "Dr. Ruth") – German-American sex therapist, talk show host, author, professor, Holocaust survivor, and former Haganah sniper
