= John Caddell =

John Caddell may refer to:

- John B. Caddell, an American tanker ship
- John Caddell, 7th Thane of Caddell, whose descendants through his daughter Muriel became Clan Campbell of Cawdor
- John Caddell (baseball), Wake Forest Demon Deacons baseball coach (1926–1939)
