= Ron Robinson =

Ron Robinson may refer to:

- Ron Robinson (baseball) (born 1962), former professional baseball pitcher
- Ron Robinson (basketball) (born 1980), former professional basketball player
- Ron Robinson (Canadian football) (born 1956), former slotback and wide receiver
- Ron Robinson (politician), member of the Michigan House of Representatives
- Ron Robinson (chemist) (born 1965), American cosmetic chemist and researcher
- Ron Robinson, former president of the Young America's Foundation

== See also ==
- Ronnie Robinson (disambiguation)
