= Elizabeth Jackson =

Elizabeth Jackson may refer to:

- Elizabeth Jackson (publisher), 18th century British publisher and printseller
- Elizabeth Hutchinson Jackson (1737–1781), mother of US President Andrew Jackson
- Elizabeth Jackson (1865–1889), possible victim of Jack the Ripper
- Elizabeth Rhodes Jackson (1875–1955), American editor and writer
- Elizabeth Jackson (radio journalist), Australian local radio presenter
- Elizabeth Jackson (runner) (born 1977), American track and field athlete

== See also ==
- Betty Jackson (born 1949), British fashion designer
- Bessie Jackson, American blues singer
