= Effects of Hurricane Sandy in New York =

Hurricane Sandy
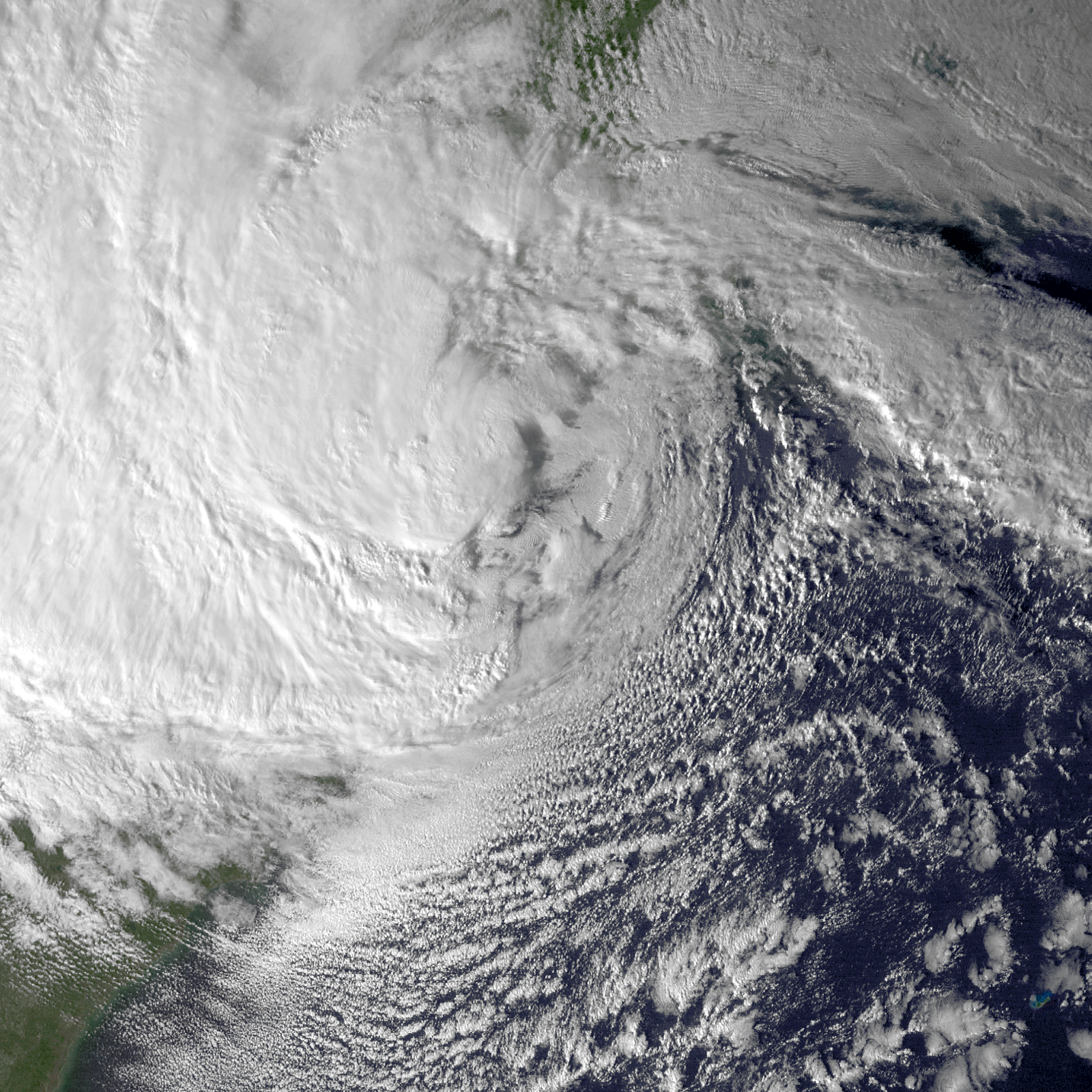
- Satellite image of Sandy shortly before landfall in New Jersey on October 29

Meteorological history
- Duration: October 28-29, 2012

Category 1 hurricane
- 1-minute sustained (SSHWS/NWS)
- Highest winds: 80 mph (130 km/h)
- Lowest pressure: 945 mbar (hPa); 27.91 inHg

Overall effects
- Fatalities: 53 total
- Damage: $32 billion (2012 USD)
- Areas affected: New York, especially the New York metropolitan area
- Part of the 2012 Atlantic hurricane season
- History: Meteorological history; Effects: Greater Antilles; United States; Maryland and Washington, D.C.; New Jersey; New York; New England; Canada; Other wikis: Commons: Sandy images

New York was severely affected by Hurricane Sandy on October 29–30, 2012, particularly New York City, its suburbs, and Long Island. Sandy's impacts included the flooding of the New York City Subway system, of many suburban communities, and of all road tunnels entering Manhattan except the Lincoln Tunnel. The New York Stock Exchange closed for two consecutive days. Numerous homes and businesses were destroyed by fire, including over 100 homes in Breezy Point, Queens. Large parts of the city and surrounding areas lost electricity for several days. Several thousand people in midtown Manhattan were evacuated for six days due to a crane collapse at Extell's One57. Bellevue Hospital Center and a few other large hospitals were closed and evacuated. Flooding at 140 West Street and another exchange disrupted voice and data communication in lower Manhattan.

At least 43 people died in New York City as a result of the storm, and 53 in the state. Thousands of homes and an estimated 250,000 vehicles were destroyed during the storm, and the economic losses in New York City were estimated to be roughly $19 billion with an estimated $32.8 billion required for restoration across the state.

== Preparations ==
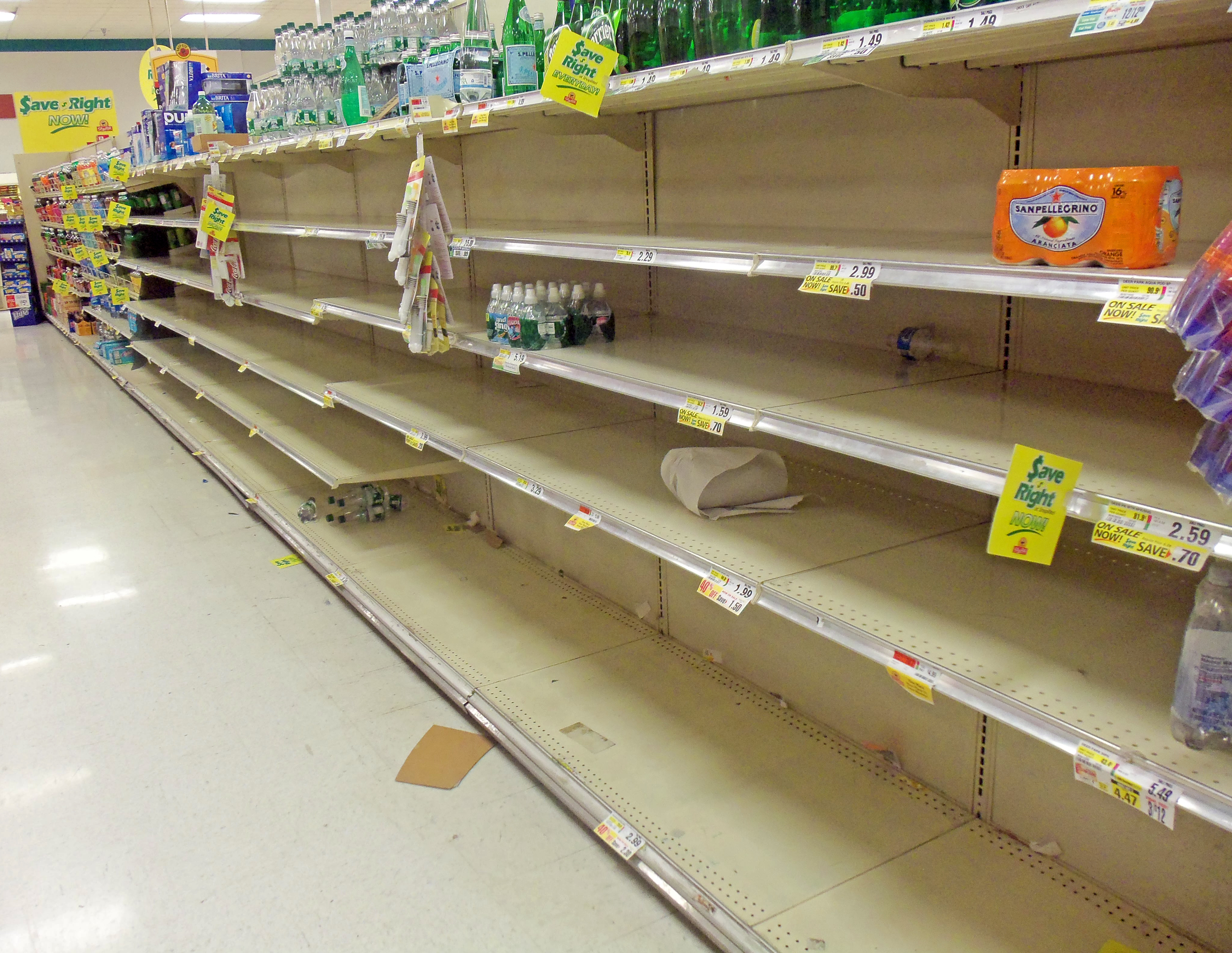
Shelves at a Montgomery, New York, ShopRite supermarket emptied of bottled water on eve of storm

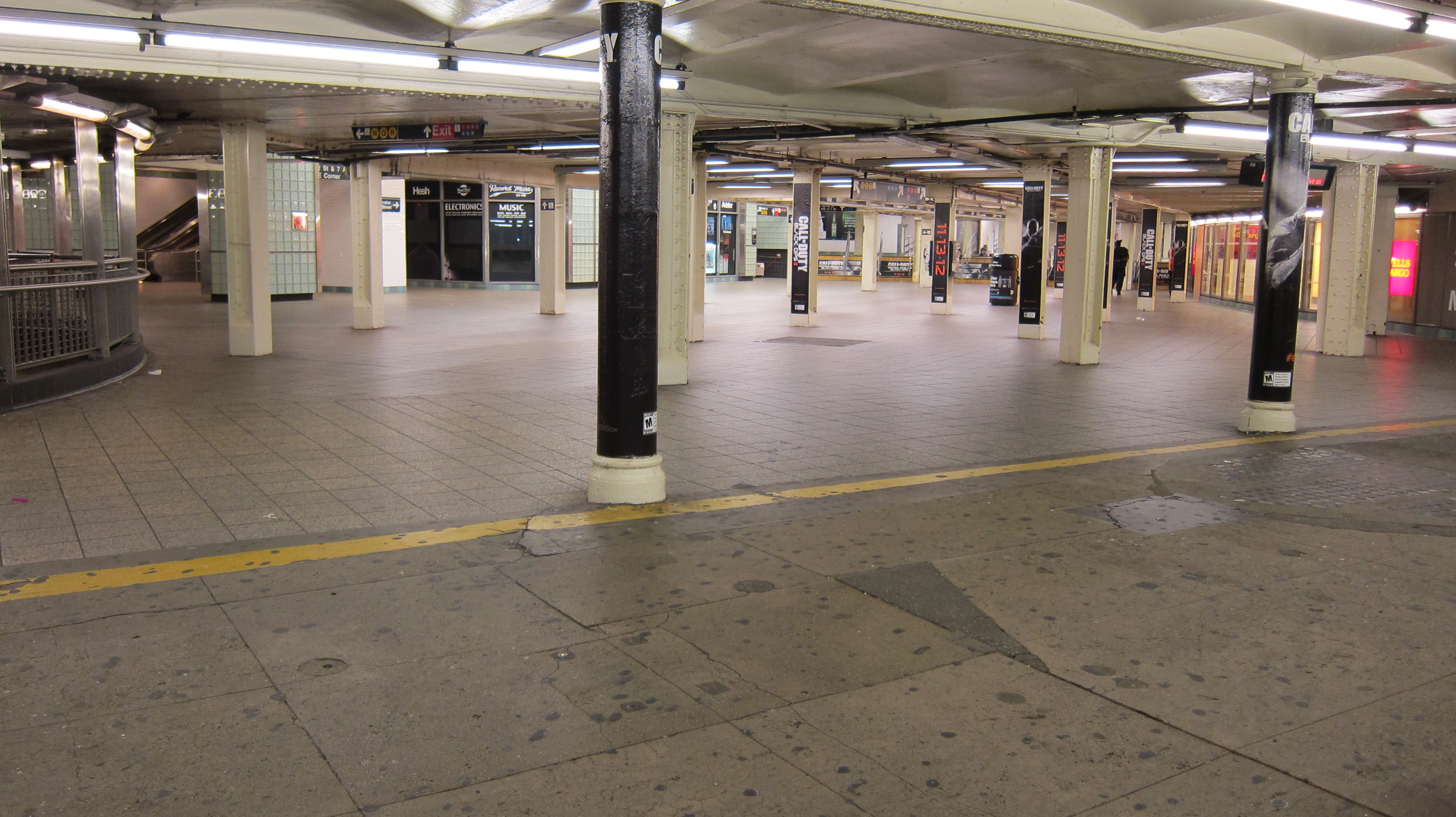
Times Square subway station shut down during Hurricane Sandy

Hurricane Sandy originated in the Caribbean Sea on October 22. Early on October 25, Hurricane Sandy moved across eastern Cuba as a major hurricane and emerged into the western Atlantic Ocean. The National Hurricane Center (NHC) expected that Sandy would become extratropical at some point before hitting the New Jersey coast, but there was uncertainty in the timing. Ultimately, Sandy made landfall near Brigantine, New Jersey at 22:30 UTC on October 29, about 2½ hours after becoming extratropical. To avoid potential confusion, the NHC did not issue hurricane and tropical cyclone warnings; instead, the National Weather Service (NWS) office in New York City issued high wind warnings, reflecting the expectation of wind gusts over 58 mph (93 km/h). As early as October 27, the NHC forecast a 4 to 8 ft (1.2 to 2.4 m) storm surge inundation, which they later increased to 6 to 11 ft (1.8 to 3.4 m).

On October 28, New York Governor Andrew Cuomo declared a state of emergency for every county in the state. He also asked for a pre-disaster declaration to better access federal assistance. Nassau County Executive Ed Mangano ordered voluntary evacuations of the South Shore storm surge area, which includes the area south of Sunrise Highway, as well as the North Shore's areas north of Route 25A and in elevations 15 feet above sea level or less. Shelters were opened at Levittown Memorial High School, Locust Valley High School, Nassau Community College and SUNY Old Westbury. In Suffolk County, officials ordered mandatory evacuations for residents of Fire Island and in surge zone areas in Babylon, Brookhaven, Islip, Riverhead, Southampton and Southold. Shelters were opened at Hampton Bays High School, Sachem East High School, and the Brentwood High School Sonderling Building. Most schools closed in Nassau and Suffolk counties on October 29, including Adelphi University, Hofstra University, Molloy College, Nassau Community College and Stony Brook University.

On October 28, President Barack Obama signed an emergency declaration for the state of New York. The Metro-North Railroad and the Long Island Rail Road suspended service beginning 7 p.m. October 27 through October 29 and possibly October 30. Starbucks closed all of its outlets in the city and Long Island on October 28 at 4 p.m. to let employees get home before the transit system shut down. The stores remained closed on October 29. The Tappan Zee Bridge was closed October 29 at 4 p.m. EDT due to wind conditions.

Mayor Michael Bloomberg told reporters on October 26 that the city had begun taking precautions but said at that time there was no call for mandatory evacuations and no plans to suspend the city's mass transit or cancel school. But on October 28, Governor Cuomo ordered the MTA, including the subway, closed and in a press conference immediately after Cuomo's announcement, Mayor Bloomberg ordered public schools closed on October 29. He ordered mandatory evacuations for Zone A which includes the southern tip of Manhattan, the Coney Island-Brighton Beach and Red Hook areas of Brooklyn, the entire Rockaways peninsula, much of Staten Island, City Island, and part of the Throggs Neck area of the Bronx. On October 28, officials activated the city's coastal emergency plan, with subway closings and the evacuation of residents in areas hit during Hurricane Irene in August 2011. More than 76 evacuation shelters were open around the city.

The MTA announced that all subway, bus and commuter rail service would be suspended, beginning at 7 p.m. EDT on October 28 and expected to continue suspension through at least October 30. All PATH train service and stations were shut down at 12:01 a.m. October 29. 200 National Guard troops were deployed in the city. All bus carriers at the Port Authority Bus Terminal closed at 3 a.m. October 29. U.S. stock trading was suspended for October 29 and 30. It was the first two-day weather closure since the Great Blizzard of 1888. All state courts were closed October 29, except for arraignments and emergency applications. NYU Langone Medical Center canceled all surgeries and medical procedures, except for emergency procedures.

On October 27, Google postponed their planned Android event in New York City due to the storm. The Staten Island Ferry and East River Ferry services were suspended at least through October 29. Most bridges and tunnels closed. Major carriers canceled all flights into and out of JFK, LaGuardia and Newark-Liberty airports until it was safe to fly. Broadway theater owners canceled all October 28 evening and October 29 performances. Alternate-side parking and parking meter regulations were suspended on October 29. Grand Central Terminal, Central Park and Battery Park were closed on October 29. The Holland Tunnel and the Brooklyn–Battery Tunnel closed at 2 p.m. EDT on October 29. The Tappan Zee Bridge was closed later on that day.

One of the units at Indian Point nuclear power plant (Unit #3) was shut down around 10:45 p.m. October 29, because of external electrical grid issues according to plant operator Entergy.

== Impact ==
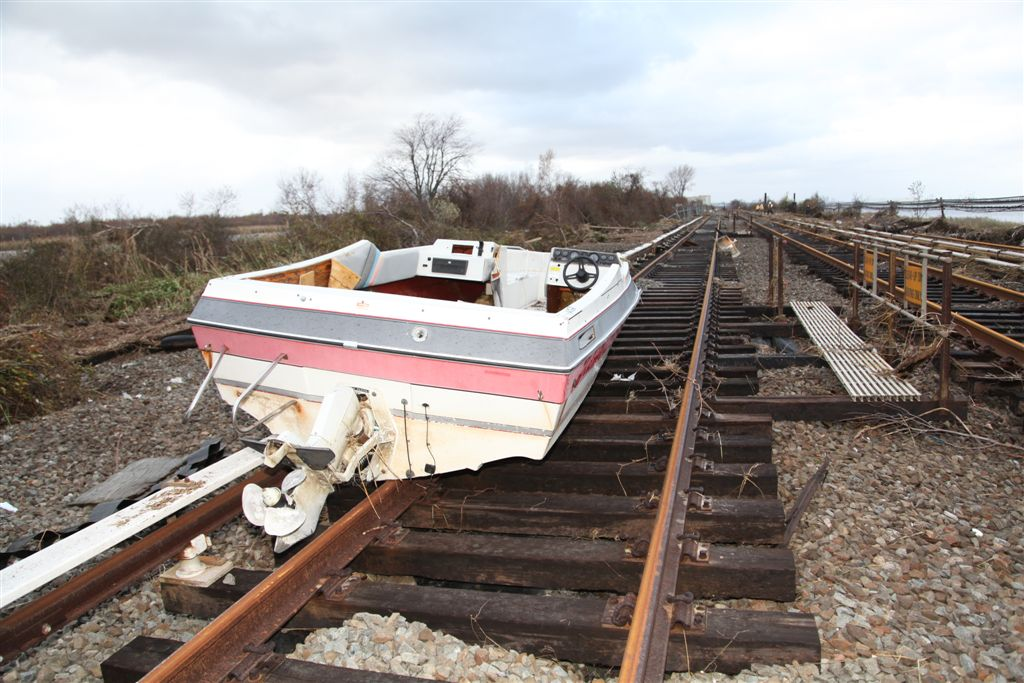
Boat on the subway tracks of the IND Rockaway Line

As an extratropical cyclone, Sandy made landfall near Atlantic City, New Jersey on October 29, about 100 mi (160 km) south of New York City. It was a large cyclone, with gale-force winds about 1,000 mi (1,600 km) in diameter. Sandy's northwest track toward the coast drove a wall of water into southeastern New York from New York Harbor, as well as from the Long Island Sound. Along the coast of Long Island and across the New York metropolitan area, the storm's large size produced record high tides and a significant storm surge, which is the rise in water above the normally expected high tide. The timing of the surge coincided with the normal high tide, as well as a full moon, which added to the increase in water. Kings Point at the western end of the Long Island Sound recorded a storm surge of 12.65 ft (3.86 m) above normal tide levels. At the Battery on the southern tip of Manhattan, a storm surge of 9.40 ft (2.87 m) was recorded, corresponding to 14.06 ft (4.29 m) above the average low tide; this was the highest water level on record, surpassing the previous record set by the December 1992 nor'easter. About 17% of New York City flooded during the storm, equating to 51 sq mi (130 km^{2}). This exceeded the 100-year flood as predicted by Federal Emergency Management Agency (FEMA). Areas along the ocean suffered from 12 ft (3.7 m) in addition to the high tides, which eroded more than 3 million yd^{3} (2.3 million m^{3} of beaches in New York City. Oceanfront locations with nourished beach, dunes, or bulkheads had less flooding.

Sandy's large circulation produced high winds across southern New York. At Great Gull Island in the Long Island Sound, sustained winds reached 75 mph (121 km/h) while Sandy was still a tropical cyclone. Wind gusts reached 95 mph (153 km/h) at Eatons Neck along the northern coast of Long Island. Hurricane-force gusts occurred throughout the New York metropolitan area and along Long Island. The storm also dropped light rainfall across the state. Precipitation in New York reached 3.42 in (87 mm) in Sherman, in the extreme western portion of the state.

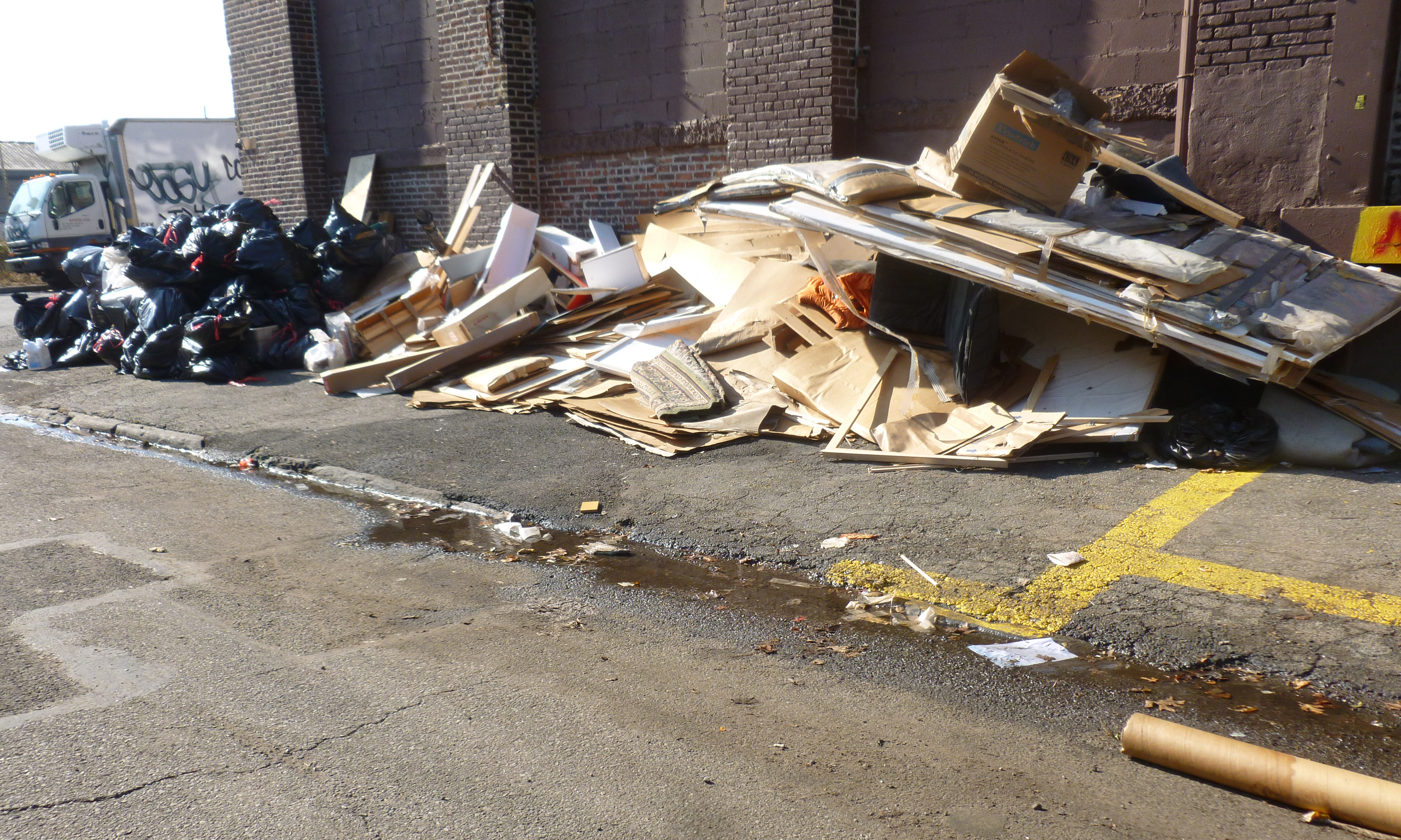
Refuse from storm damage in Gowanus, Red Hook, Brooklyn

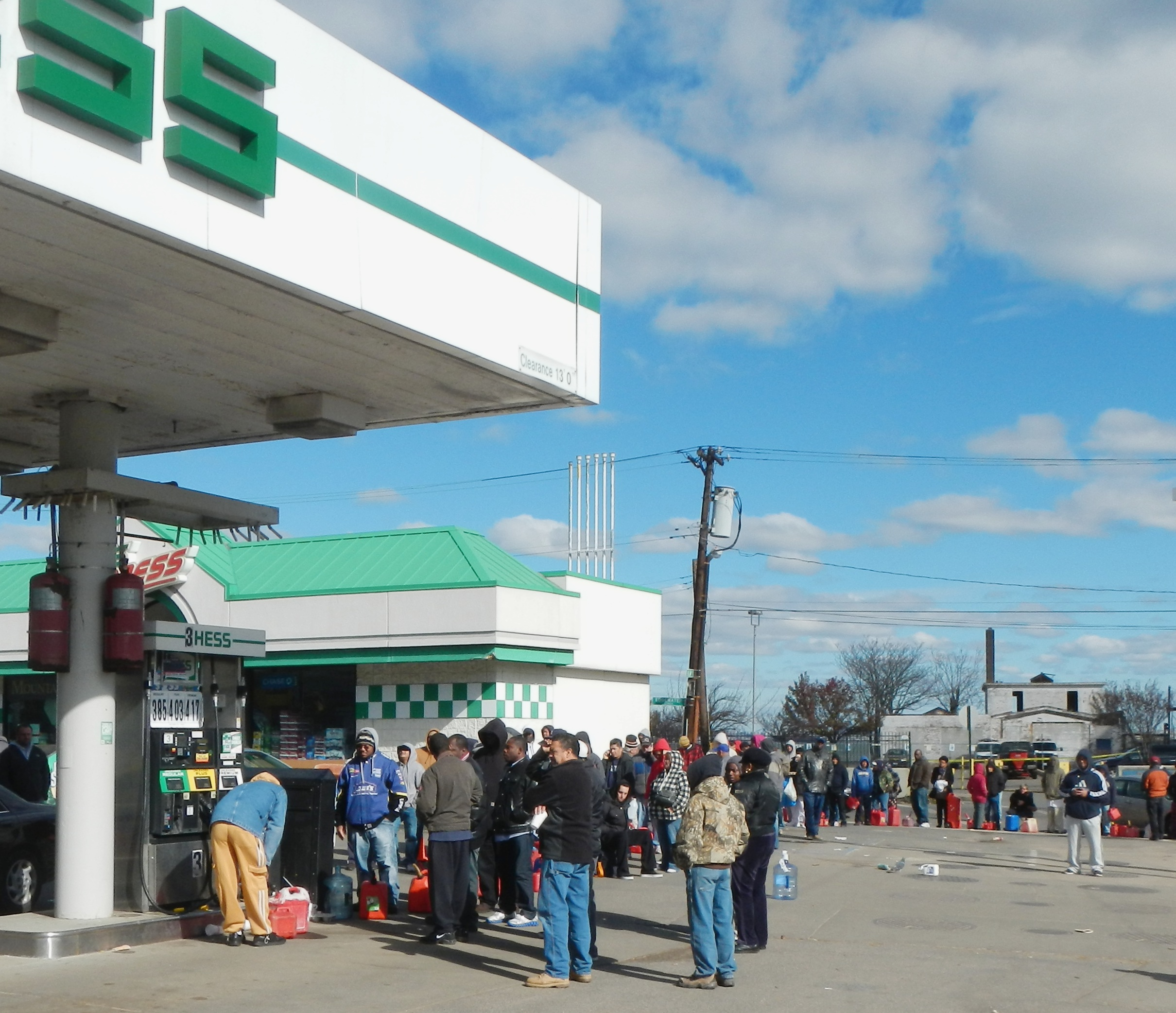
Residents of a blackout zone seek gasoline in a nearby lit zone

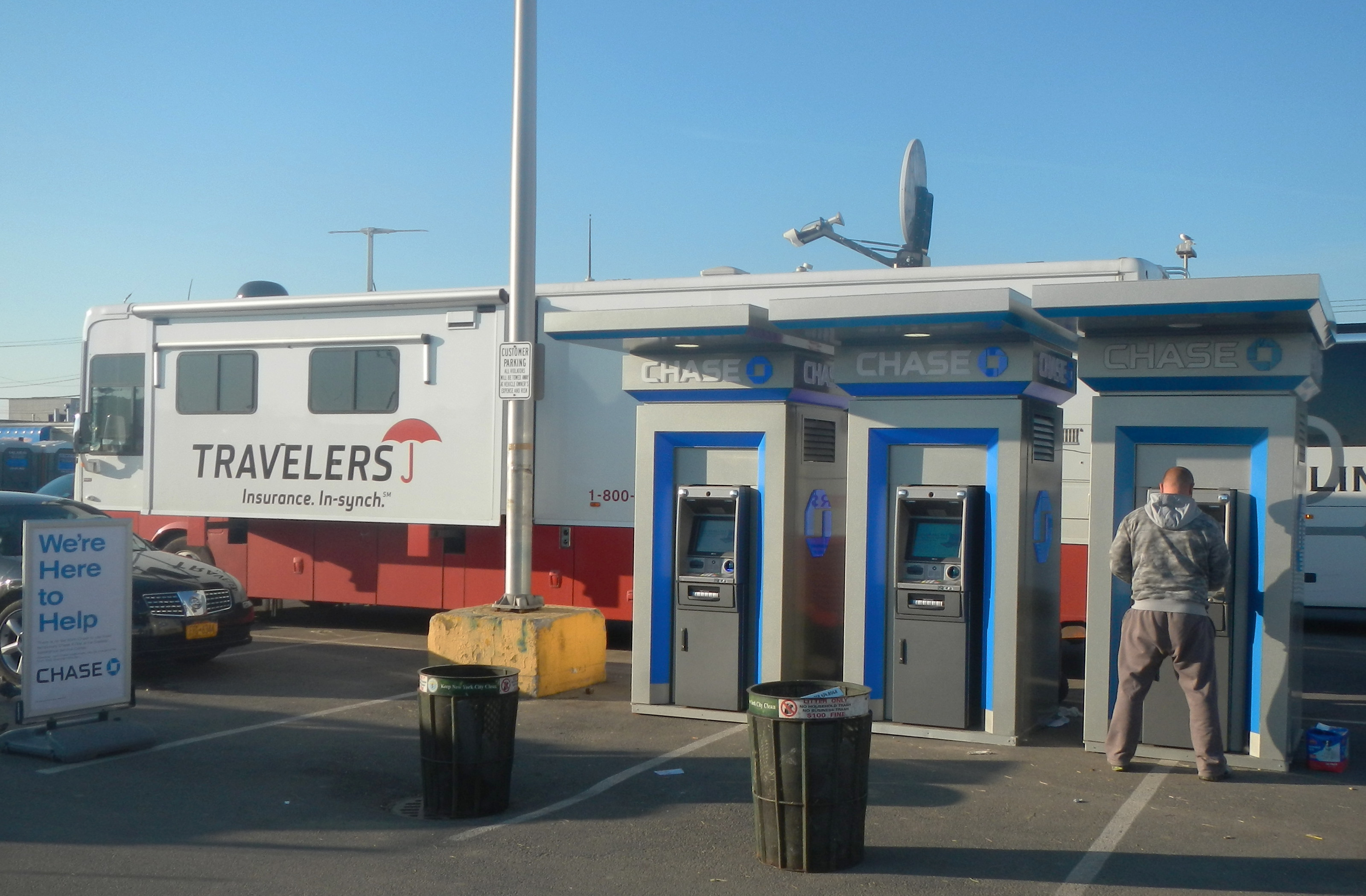
Mobile banking and insurance offices serve Rockaway

Across New York, Sandy killed 48 people directly related to its impacts, including floodwaters and winds. The storm caused 43 deaths in New York City, mostly in Staten Island. There were another five deaths caused by carbon monoxide poisoning, after people used generators inside their homes. Power outages affected nearly 2 million people in New York City, while more than 1 million people lost cellphone service. Statewide, Sandy destroyed about 305,000 homes, mostly related to the high storm surge. In New York City alone, the floodwaters entered the homes of more than 443,000 people and more than 23,400 businesses. About 75,000 people in poor health were affected by the floodwaters, while another 54,000 people in poor health were in areas affected by power outages. On November 26, Cuomo estimated statewide damage and losses at $32 billion. Bloomberg announced earlier in the day that the storm caused $19 billion in losses in New York City, which was included in the estimate Cuomo gave. The statewide damage was roughly half of the nationwide estimate of $68.7 billion, with much of the remaining damage occurring in neighboring New Jersey.

The Old Orchard Shoal Light in New York Harbor was destroyed by the hurricane.

=== Electricity ===
As of the morning of November 1, Con Ed had restored two power networks, but there were still more than 600,000 customers without power throughout the five boroughs. Con Ed predicted most all of Manhattan would be fully restored by November 3. By the afternoon of the same day, Con Ed said it expected to "restore the vast majority of customers who lost power by the weekend of November 10 and 11. The remaining customer restorations could take an additional week more."

As of the morning of November 2, more than 1.3 million customers were without power, down from 2.2 million. As of 5:00 a.m. EDT (0900 GMT) on that date Con Edison said about 226,000 customers lacked service in Manhattan, 84,000 in Queens, 35,000 in Brooklyn, 54,000 in Staten Island 31,000 in the Bronx and 140,000 in Westchester. On Long Island, LIPA said it still had about 532,000 customers without power, down from more than 900,000. In the evening of November 2, LIPA said they expected to cut the number of customer outages by 150,000 by November 4.

As of 4 a.m. November 3, Con Ed reported about:

- 94,769 customer outages in Manhattan
- 81,372 customer outages in Queens
- 37,504 customer outages in Staten Island
- 31,448 customer outages in Brooklyn
- 26,252 customer outages in the Bronx

During the evening of November 3, Con Ed announced all Manhattan power networks were back online. Approximately 153,000 Con Ed customers were without power as of 8 p.m. November 3:

- 9,211 customer outages in Manhattan
- 74,067 customer outages in Queens
- 27,842 customer outages in Staten Island
- 24,707 customer outages in Brooklyn
- 19,501 customer outages in the Bronx

As of around noon November 5, Con Ed reported those without electricity were:

- 3,825 customer outages in Manhattan
- 38,397 customer outages in Queens
- 17,465 customer outages in Staten Island
- 22,887 customer outages in Brooklyn
- 8,282 customer outages in the Bronx

As of January 2013, there were still 8,200 people without power.

=== Structures ===
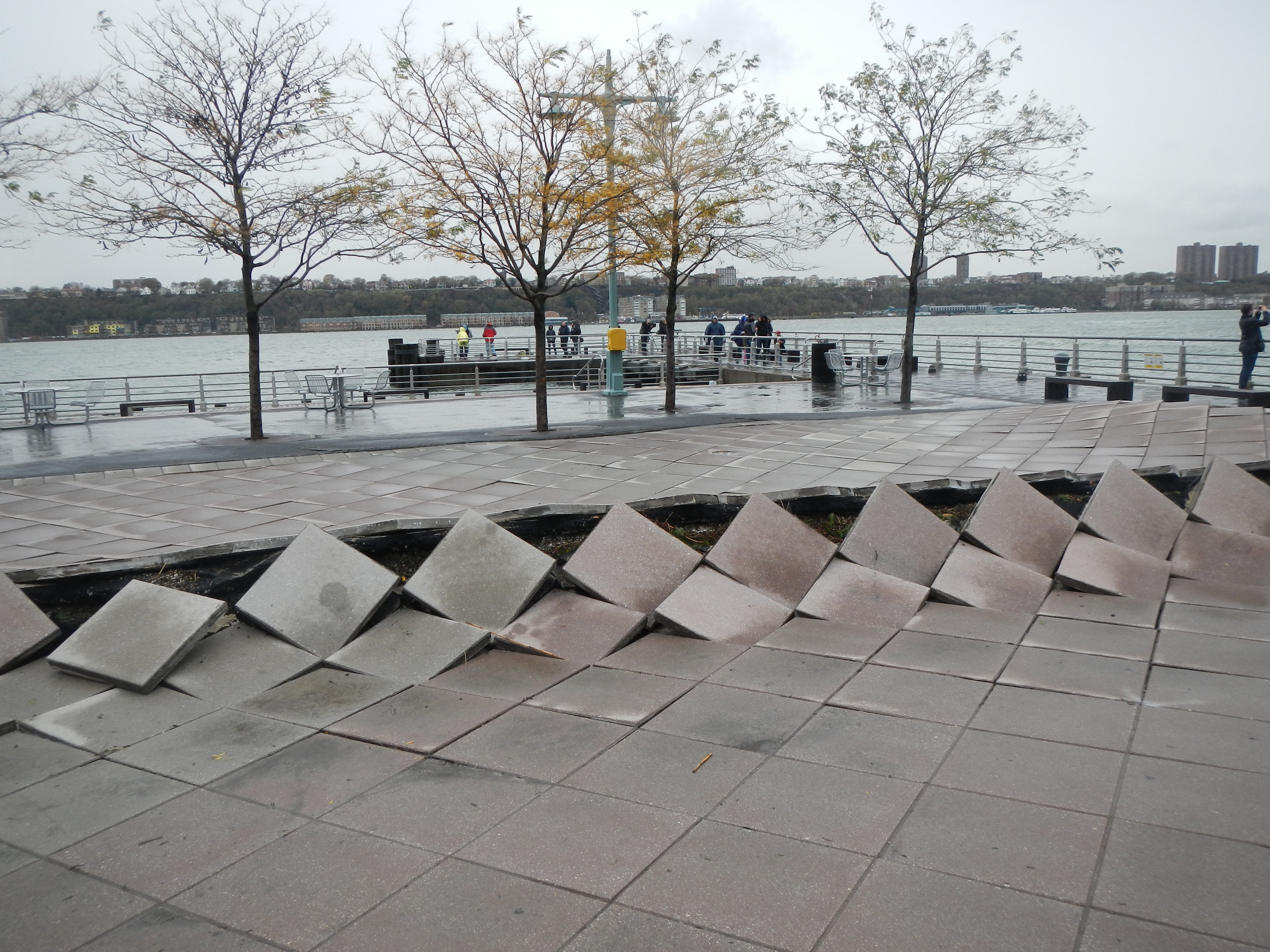
Pier damaged by waves

The storm damaged, destroyed, or severely flooded around 100,000 homes on Long Island. As of December 10, 2012, more than 2,000 homes were deemed uninhabitable.

Bloomberg stated on November 3 that 55,000 buildings in the city's Zone A were ordered to evacuate and would be inspected for damage.

=== Transportation ===
The MTA incurred about $5 billion in damage from Sandy, which became the worst disaster to affect the transit agency in its 108-year history. There was an additional $2.5 billion in transportation damage in the state. Several subway stations were severely damaged, and eight tunnels were submerged. Train service between Manhattan and Brooklyn was disrupted for several weeks after the storm.

The storm surge inundated portions of the runways and tarmacs at both LaGuardia and JFK airports.

==== Waterways and services ====
On October 31, NY Waterway ferries between Hudson County, New Jersey, and Manhattan resumed service. The Staten Island Ferry resumed full service November 2 and Staten Island Railway the next day.

On November 1, fuel ships started arriving in reopened New York Harbor.

On November 2, Governor Cuomo signed an executive order waiving the state's requirements that fuel tankers register and pay a tax before unloading.

==== Ground ====
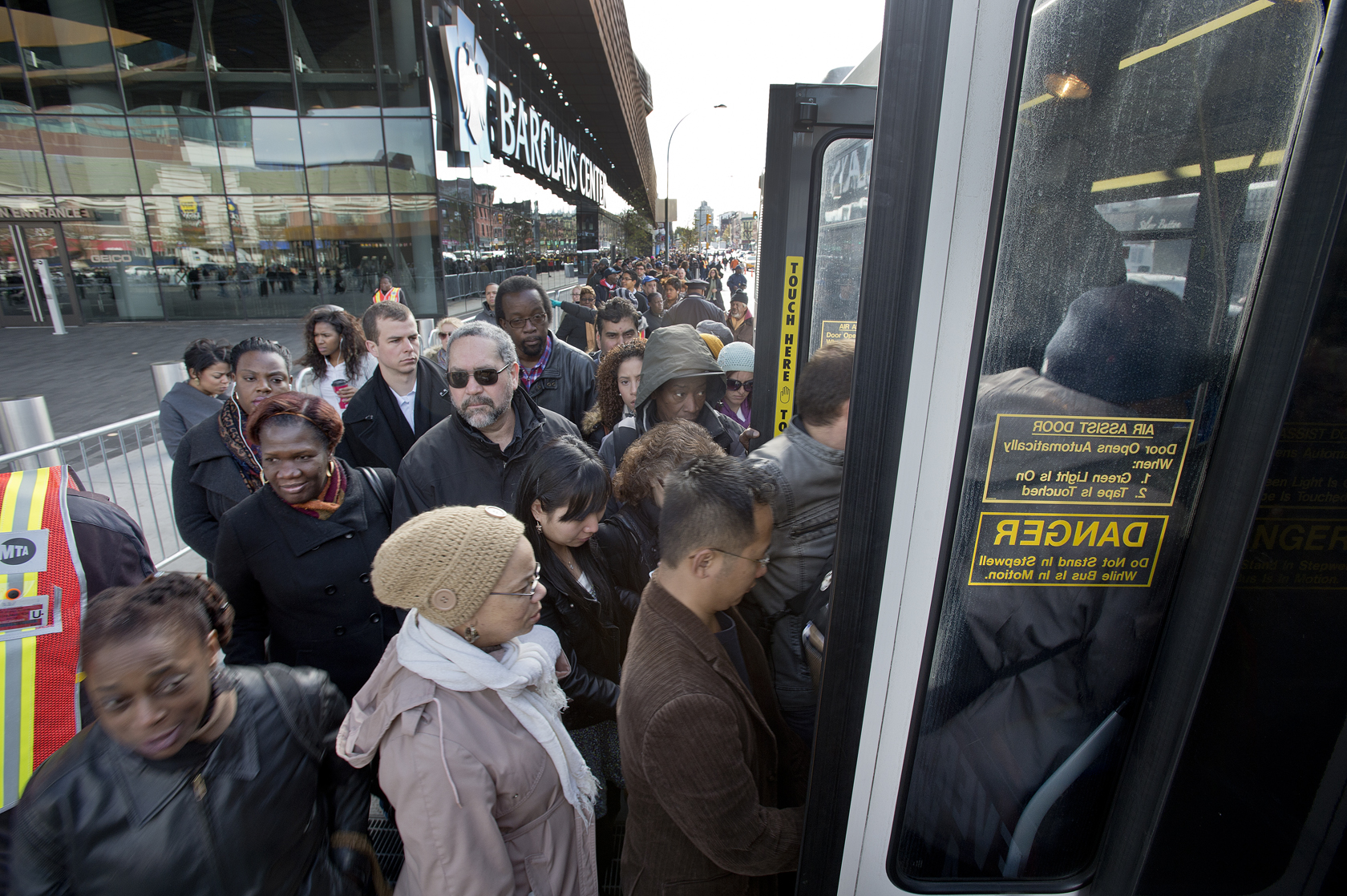
Replacement shuttle buses boarding at Barclays Center

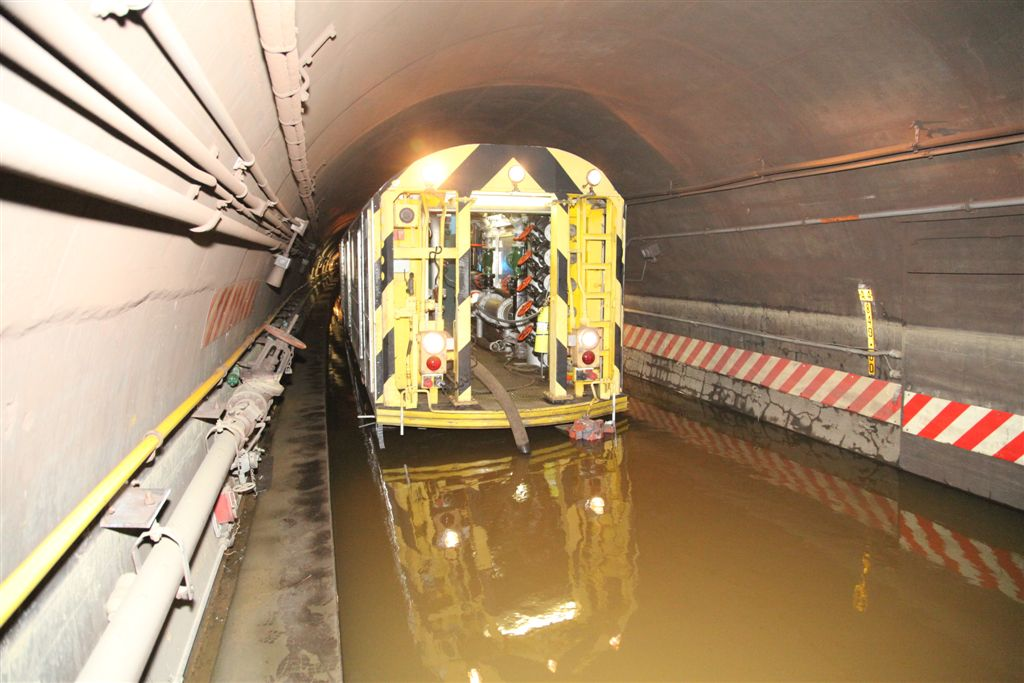
Pump train cleaning water out of the Cranberry Street Tunnel

The George Washington Bridge, Throgs Neck Bridge, Verrazzano Bridge, and Whitestone Bridge closed at 7 p.m. EDT October 29. All road tunnels into Manhattan, except the Lincoln Tunnel, were flooded and closed, as were subway tunnels under the East River and the PATH subway system. Limited bus service resumed Tuesday evening, Oct 30. Limited MTA subway service was scheduled to resume on November 1 with two East River tunnels (59th Street and 63rd Street) in operation and shuttle bus service to Manhattan from Brooklyn termini. The Long Island Rail Road remained closed due to storm damage until November 8, 2012. The LIRR then re-opened with partial service to most of its branches, excluding Long Beach. Nassau Inter-County Express and Suffolk County Transit suspended and/or greatly limited service for the storm. In response to the flooding of tunnels and other infrastructure, the United States Army Corps of Engineers sent its National Unwatering Team.

As of October 31, 2012, MTA bus service began operating on a regular schedule. The subway system was tested with plans to resume limited service to 14 of the 23 services on November 1. PATH services remained suspended; the Long Island Rail Road resumed limited, hourly service; and Metro-North restored hourly service on its Harlem Line between North White Plains and Grand Central Terminal. All bridges were open. Amtrak provided modified service starting on November 1, and the Port Authority Bus Terminal reopened with no Greyhound Lines service or commuter buses to New Jersey.

On the morning of November 1, the first train, an A train, pulled out of Penn Station three days after tunnels were flooded. Subway service in Lower Manhattan except for the IRT Lexington Avenue Line and to Brooklyn was disconnected. The G train (which is a crosstown route between Queens and Brooklyn), as well as the Rockaway Park Shuttle and the part-time B, C, and Z trains, were also suspended. Governor Cuomo waived fares on MTA trains and buses through November 5.

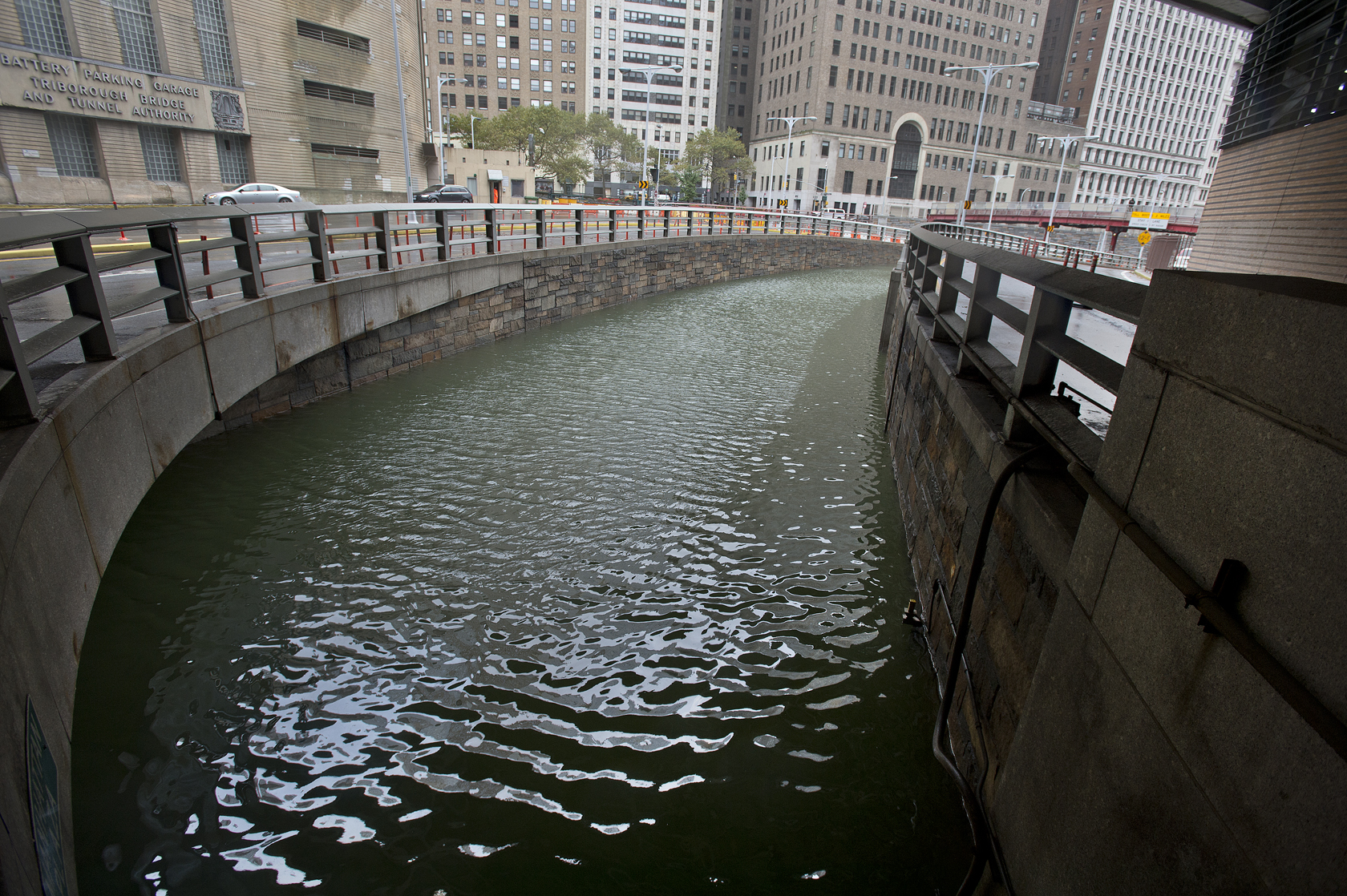
Northern access to Brooklyn–Battery Tunnel flooded

The Holland Tunnel opened to buses only on November 2. HOV restrictions on bridges and Lincoln Tunnel ended on that day. By November 3, 80 percent of subway service was restored. On November 6, the Queens Midtown Tunnel reopened one lane for buses heading into and out of Manhattan during rush hour. The Holland Tunnel reopened November 7 at 5 a.m. EST., while the Queens-Midtown Tunnel reopened on November 9 at 6 a.m. EST. The Hugh L. Carey Tunnel opened November 12 to limited rush-hour bus service.

==== Airports and airlines ====
Delta Air Lines canceled all flights out of LaGuardia Airport through October 30 at 8 p.m. EDT. The three major airports serving New York City, JFK, LaGuardia, and Newark, were closed as of 8 p.m. on October 29. More than 8,000 flights were canceled by 4 p.m. EDT for the day of October 30. LaGuardia and Newark had a total of 2,400 canceled flights. As of early morning October 31, nearly 3,000 flights were canceled, but JFK and Newark airports began handling flights after 7 a.m. LaGuardia Airport reopened November 1 at 7:00 a.m.

=== Events ===
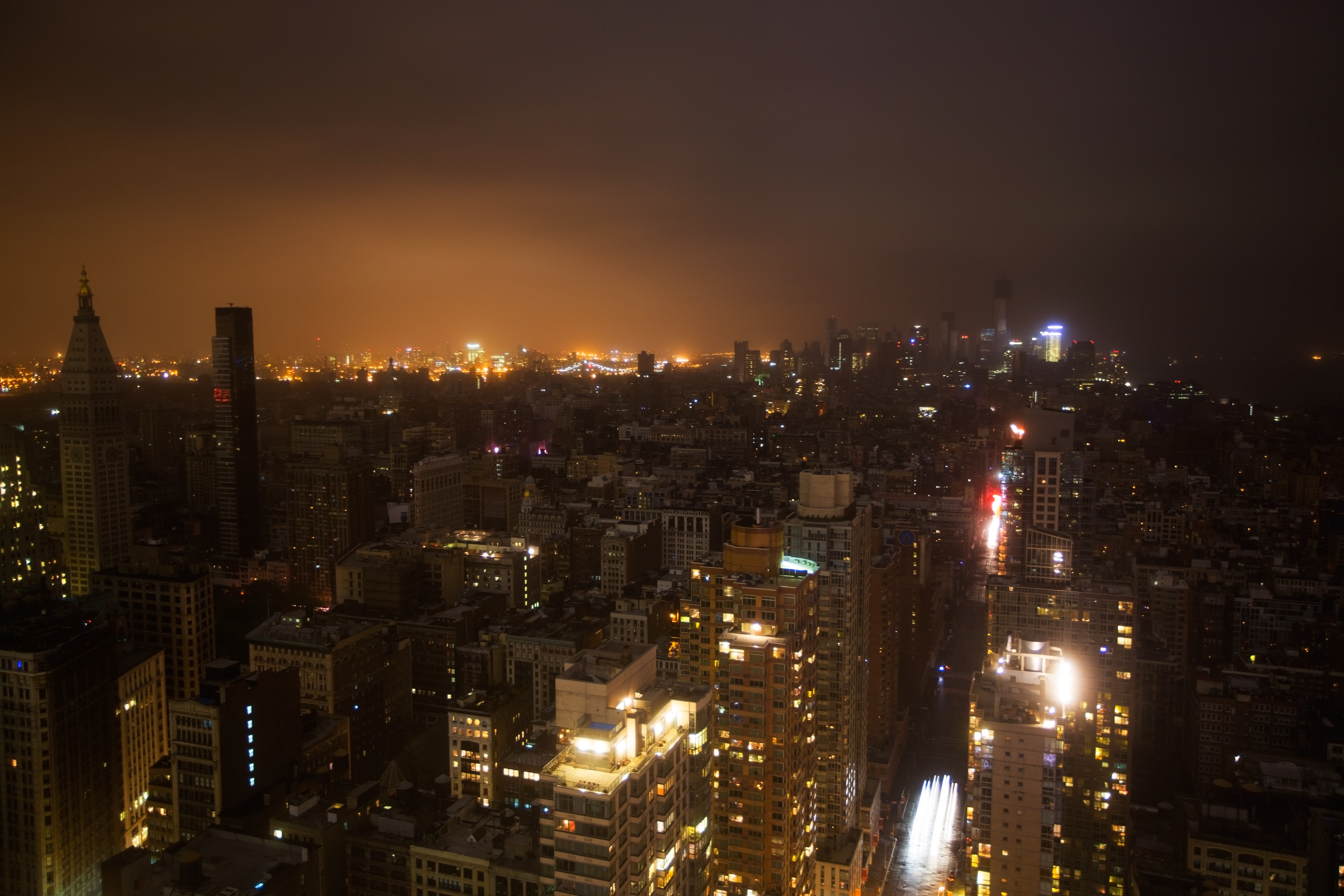
After Hurricane Sandy, large portions of Manhattan were without electricity

New York's Village Halloween Parade, held annually on October 31, was canceled due to blackout conditions in Greenwich Village. A similar parade in the Park Slope neighborhood of Brooklyn, New York was also canceled for that same reason.

After many complaints that running the New York City Marathon through affected areas would seem insensitive and would put further pressure on police and other service workers who would be better deployed in the recovery efforts, Mayor Bloomberg announced late afternoon November 2 that the race had been canceled. The event was to take place on Sunday, November 4. Marathon officials said that it would not be rescheduled.

The opening game at the Barclays Center between the National Basketball Association's Brooklyn Nets and New York Knicks originally scheduled to take place on November 1 was rescheduled for November 26.

The soccer game between the New York Red Bulls and D.C. United in the 2012 Major League Soccer playoffs, scheduled for November 3, was moved to November 7, due to a power outage at Red Bull Arena in New Jersey.

=== Staten Island ===
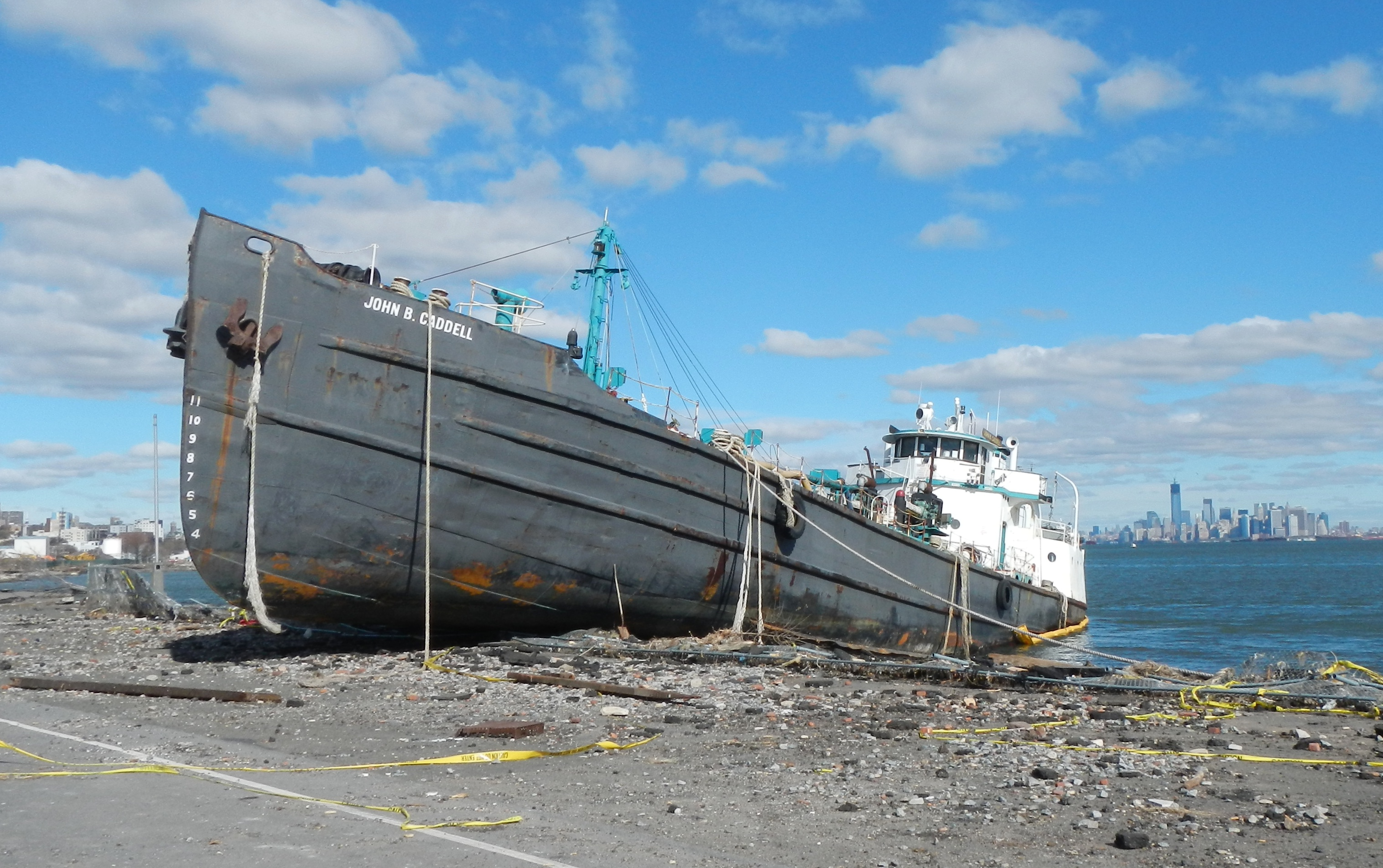
Tanker beached on Front Street, Staten Island

The most significant water levels in the state from Sandy occurred in Staten Island. Along the northern tip along the Kill Van Kull, Sandy produced a storm surge of 9.56 ft (2.91 m) above normal tide levels, which corresponded to water levels 14.58 ft (4.44 m) above the average low tide. This surpassed the previous record by 4.57 ft (1.39 m), set by Irene a year earlier. The highest-observed water line in the state was 7.9 ft (2.4 m) above ground, measured on a doorframe of a house in Staten Island's Oakwood neighborhood.

Staten Island experienced sustained winds of 40–60 mph (64–97 km/h), with gusts of up to 80 mph (130 km/h).

At least 21 people died on Staten Island from the storm surge. Floodwaters washed away entire blocks of houses in Midland Beach, New Dorp, and Oakwood Beach.

On October 30, the John B. Caddell tanker was driven ashore at Staten Island.

=== Manhattan ===
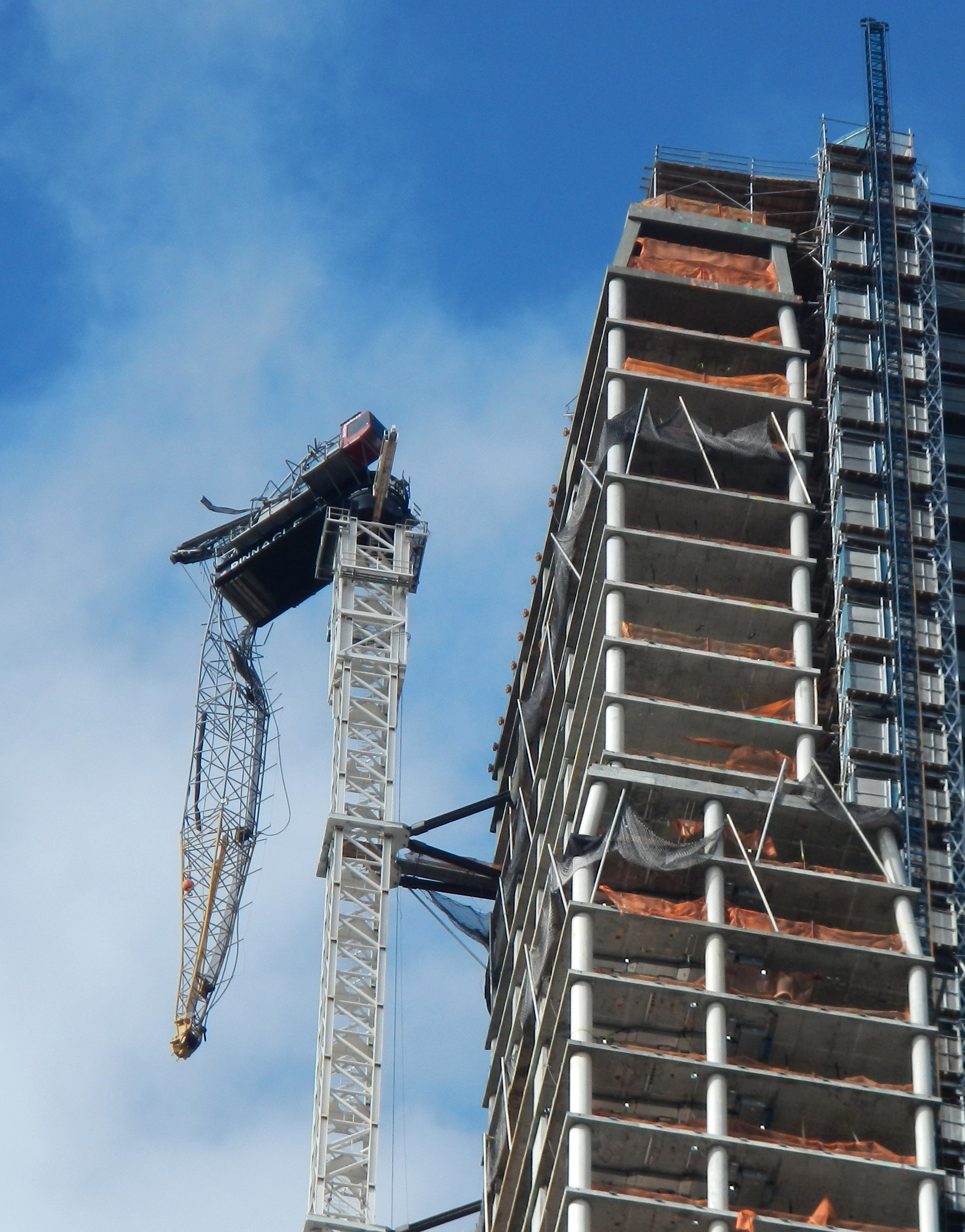
Crane collapse at One57 on 57th Street

Parts of Lower Manhattan were inundated by floodwaters, possibly as much as 8 ft (2.4 m) deep, based on water marks measured near the South Street Seaport. At One World Trade Center in the Financial District, water levels were 4.7 ft (1.4 m) above ground. Floodwaters reached the corner of Canal and Hudson streets. Waters from the East River inundated parts of the East Village.

The floods entered hundreds of buildings across Manhattan. The South Ferry/Whitehall Street station in Battery Park was largely destroyed, after the storm surge submerged the station with 80 ft (24 m) of floodwaters. The station was less than four years old, as the previous station was rebuilt following the September 11 attacks of 2001.

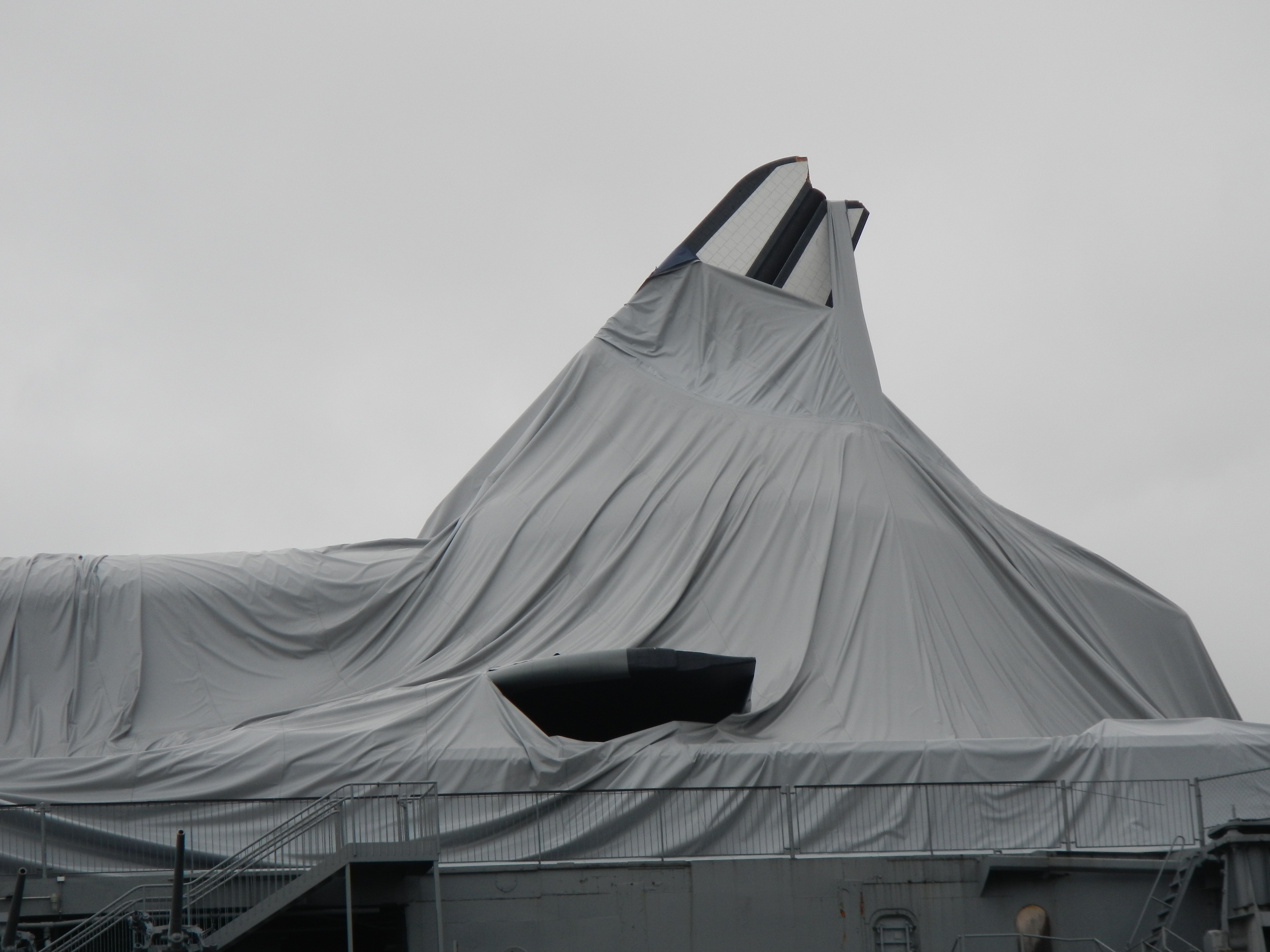
Space Shuttle Enterprise

Heavy winds caused a construction crane atop One57 to collapse, causing the area to be evacuated on October 29. The crane was secured to the building on November 3 and West 57th Street reopened to traffic that evening.

Space Shuttle Enterprise, on board the flight deck of the Intrepid Sea, Air & Space Museum in the Hudson River, was damaged. The inflatable pavilion containing the shuttle appears to have first deflated and then been torn by the high winds.

Everywhere in Lower Manhattan south of 39th Street lost power. However, in spite of all the flooding, rainfall in Central Park was only 0.95 in (24 mm).

=== Brooklyn ===
In Brooklyn, the most significant inundation was 4.5 ft (1.4 m), with large parts of Red Hook underwater.

Damaged structures included community centers in South Brooklyn. The offices of the Jewish Community Council of Greater Coney Island, as well as a senior home run by the organization, were affected.

=== Queens ===
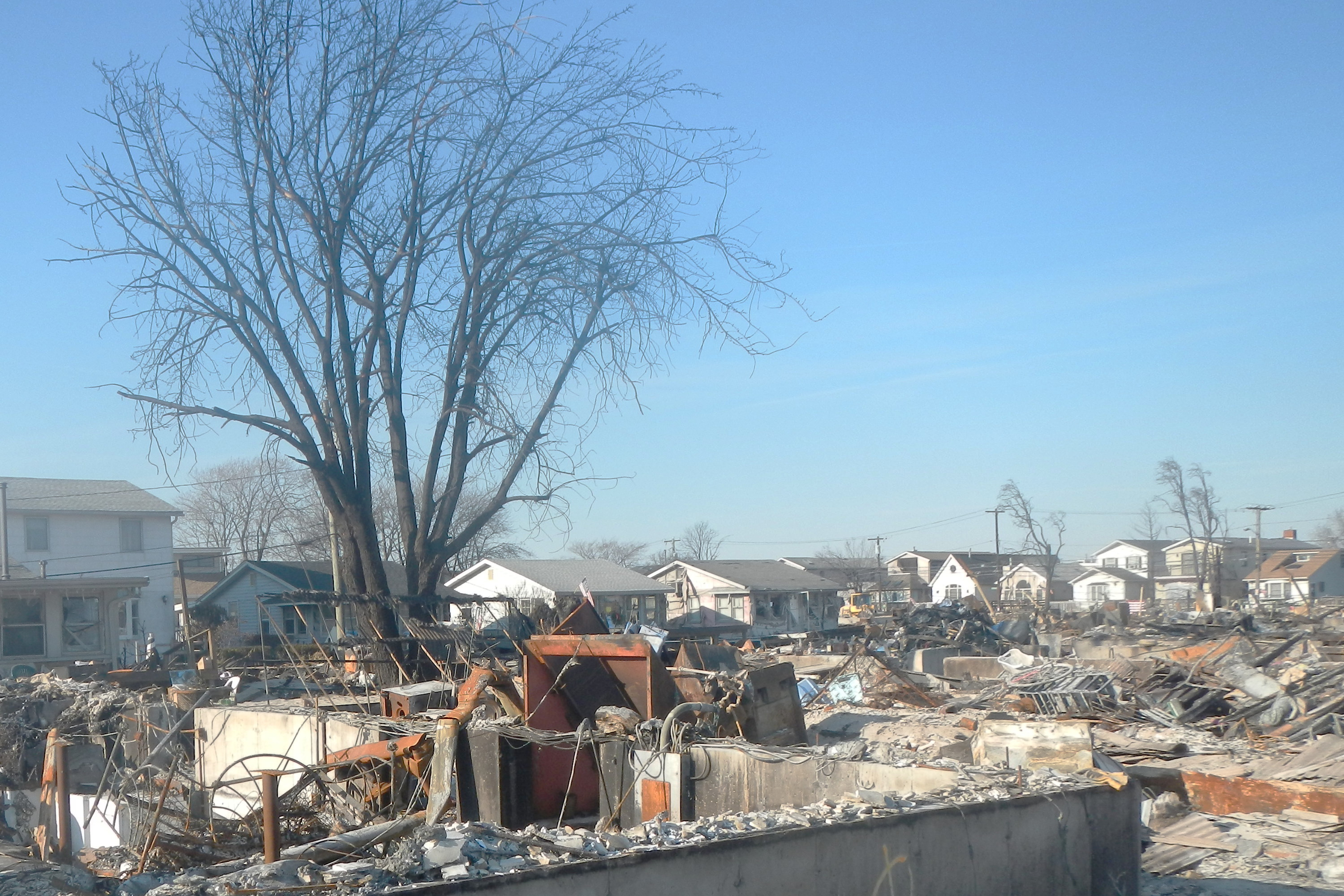
Breezy Point, Queens

Water levels in Queens reached 6 ft (1.8 m) deep in Maspeth. Along the Rockaways on the southern coast of Long Island, two stations recorded water levels of 5.4 ft (1.6 m) deep.

On October 30, over 190 firefighters fought a six alarm fire that destroyed 111 structures and damaged another 20 in Breezy Point, Queens, as a result of the storm. The area had been under evacuation orders, but some residents rode out the storm. One firefighter and two residents were injured. The rescuers were in chest-deep water and had to use a boat to reach survivors. A transformer explosion is suspected to have caused the fire. On October 31, Breezy Point residents pledged to rebuild their community.

=== Remainder of Long Island ===
On the eastern tip of Long Island, the storm surge reached 5.89 ft (1.80 m) above normal water levels in Montauk. The entirety of Fire Island was inundated by the floodwaters, with a high-water mark of 5.6 ft (1.7 m). Along the island, about 200 homes were washed away or destroyed. Much of the protective dunes along the beach were swept away, and most coastal areas were inundated a few blocks inland. Coastal damage was heaviest in Mastic and Moriches. Around Peconic Bay, water levels were about 7 to 9 feet (2.1 to 2.7 m) deep. The high tides breached through Westhampton Island east of Moriches Inlet. Severe beach erosion occurred in Montauk Point State Park. In Riverhead, the flooded Peconic River covered a traffic circle.

Storm surge damage in Long Beach, NY

In Suffolk County and on Fire Island, numerous people – including a dozen firefighters who sought to rescue a Massapequa home's two residents – were rescued by emergency crews via front-end loaders and "high axle" vehicles. One home in West Babylon and another in Lindenhurst were burning continuously, and both had to be knocked down with payloaders.

In Nassau County, the city of Long Beach sustained $150 million in damage.

=== Bronx ===
In the Throggs Neck neighborhood of the Bronx, water levels reached 3.4 ft (1.0 m) deep. Despite 49,000 power outages in the borough, no lives were lost, and damage in the borough was reported as less severe than other boroughs.

=== Elsewhere ===
Sandy's large circulation and storm surge inundated parts of the Hudson River valley more than 100 mi (160 km) upstream, in conjunction with light rainfall across the state. In Poughkeepsie, water levels reached 5.1 ft (1.6 m) deep. Homes and businesses along the river were damaged. A portion of Interstate 787 near Albany was inundated. Wind gusts reached 60 mph (97 km/h) in Stone Ridge. The high winds caused power outage across eastern New York, affecting 63,000 people in Dutchess and Ulster counties. The northeasterly winds also produced high waves along Lake George and Peck Lake, which damaged docks along their southern shores. The high winds caused a fatal traffic accident when a driver in Kerhonkson was struck by flying debris. Rainfall was largely 1–3 in (25–76 mm) in the Catskill Mountains, but only 0.15 in (3.8 mm) in Albany.

In western New York, the former hurricane produced gale-force winds, with a gust of 60 mph (97 km/h) measured at Irondequoit Bay. Rainfall across the region measured 2 to 5 in (51 to 127 mm), which flooded area creeks. The combination of winds and rainfall knocked down trees and power lines, leaving tens of thousands of people without power across Western New York.

== Evacuations and rescues during storm ==
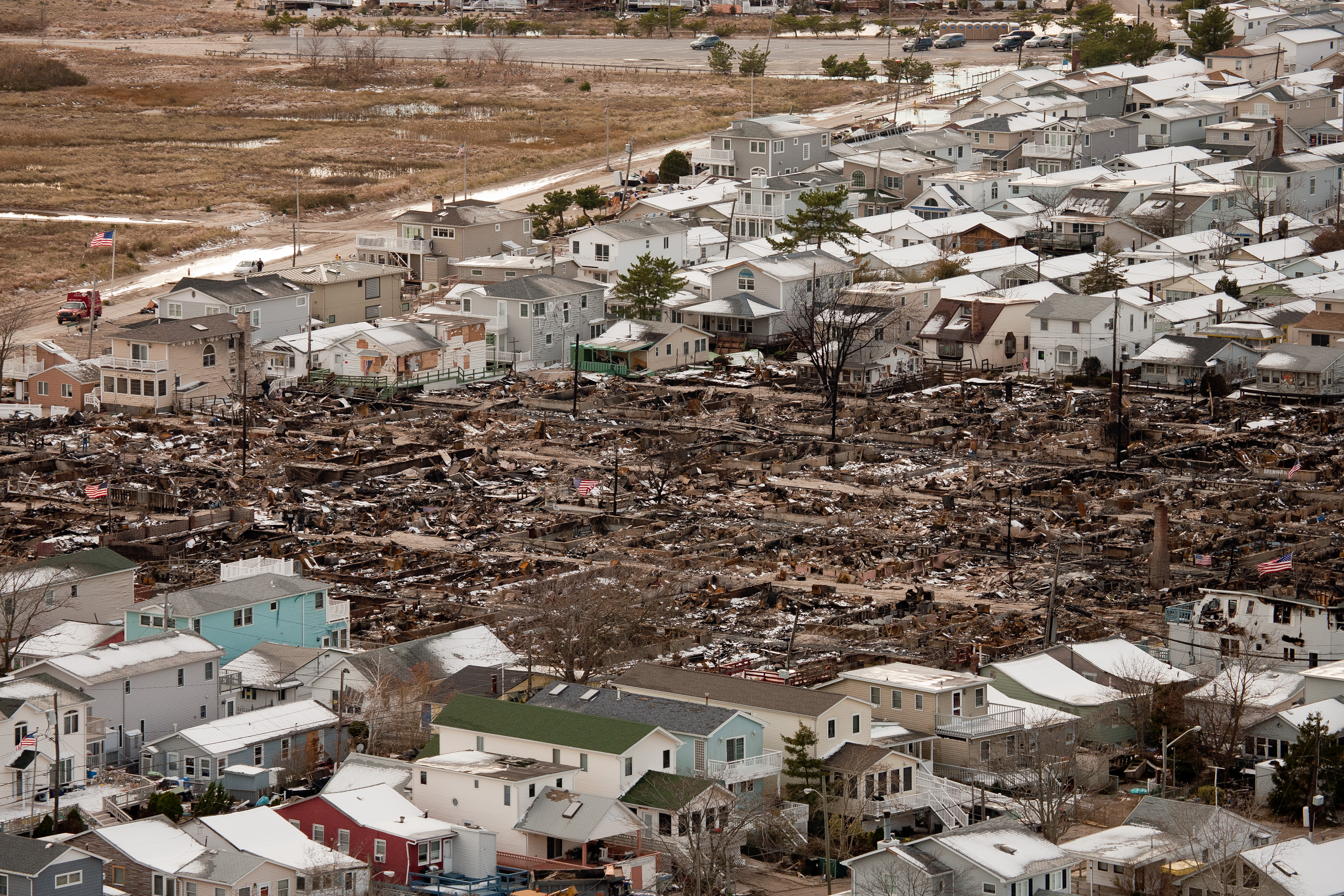
A hurricane-induced fire struck Breezy Point on October 30, 2012

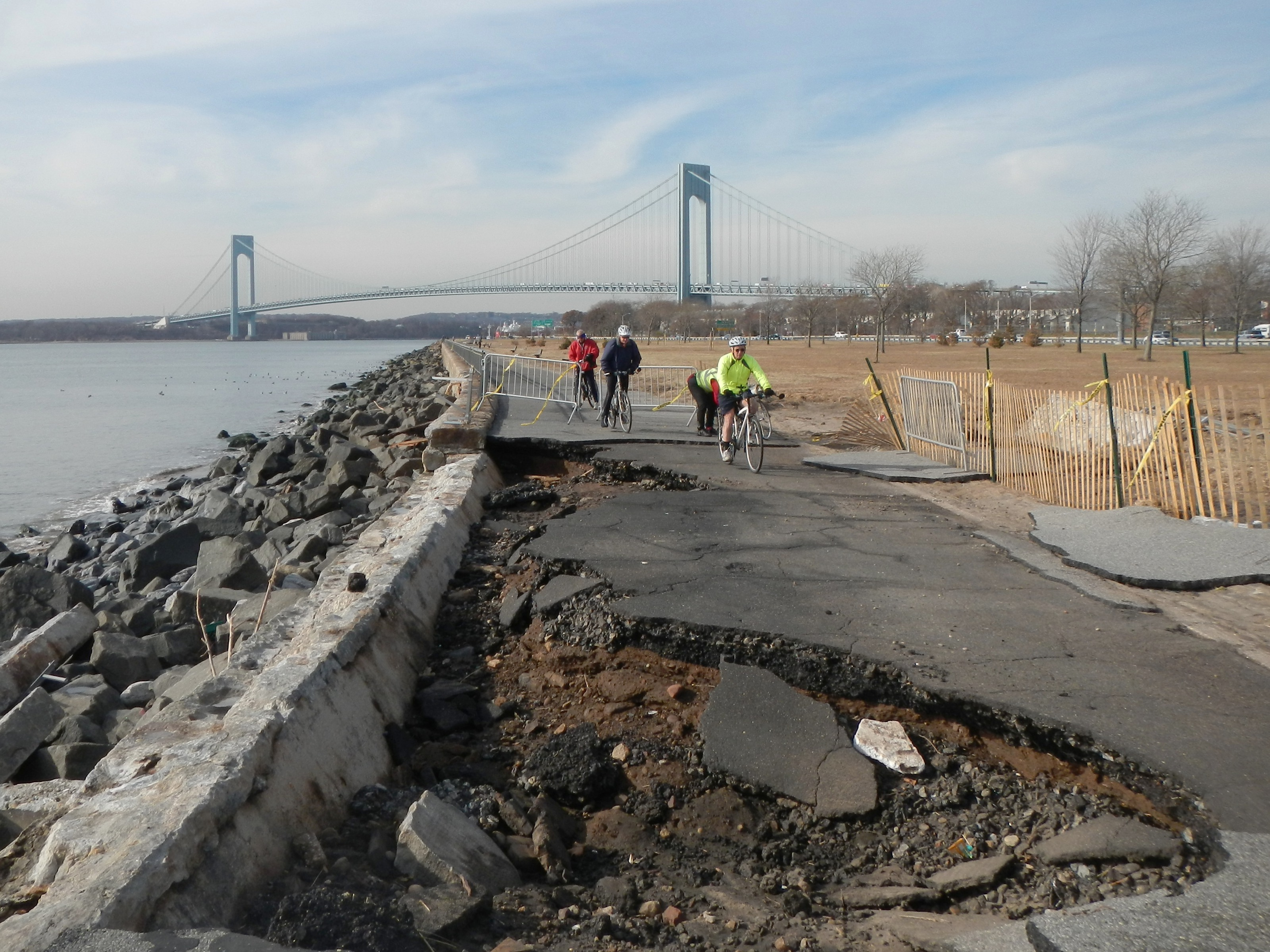
Going around a crater scoured in a Brooklyn park road

The cost of damage to the city hospital system, including emergency measures, evacuations, and staff overtime, was estimated around $1 billion. Power outages and storm impacts forced the closure of six hospitals and 26 residential care facilities in the city, which reduced the citywide hospital capacity by 8%. Capacity remained 4% below normal by four weeks after the storm, with the reduced capacity temporarily suspending elective procedures. The Healthcare Evacuation Center coordinated the evacuation of more than 6,400 patients. Ten hospitals remained open despite flooding or power outages, with five of them using emergency generators. The facilities that stayed open repurposed areas to accommodate the influx of patients. For at least four days after Sandy struck, many nursing home workers lived on site.

Ahead of the storm, the New York Downtown Hospital, VA New York Harbor Healthcare System, and South Beach Psychiatric Center closed preemptively ahead of the storm. Three other hospitals began evacuations during the storm – New York University Langone Medical Center, Bellevue Hospital Center, and Coney Island Hospital. After the first floor was submerged and communications were cut, Coney Island Hospital staff cared for more than 220 patients using flashlights and battery-powered devices, until it was safe enough to evacuate. About 60 nearby residents fled to the hospital during the peak of the storm.

New York University Langone Medical Center was evacuated October 29 after the backup generators at the hospital failed due to flooding. Over 200 patients were safely transferred to other hospitals. Bellevue Hospital Center (about 500 patients), Coney Island Hospital, and Palisades Medical Center are additional New York City area hospitals which have been either partially or fully evacuated.

The Emergency Medical Services of New York City faced a series of challenges and setbacks during the storm relating to the flooding, closure, and evacuation of hospitals and FDNY-EMS Stations across the city. Downtown Hospital was closed in preparation for the storm, but several hospitals were forced to close during the storm, including Bellevue Hospital, NYU Hospital, Manhattan VA Hospital, Metropolitan Hospital, Coney Island Hospital, and St. Johns Hospital. A fire broke out on the fourth floor of Coney Island Hospital, which proved difficult for Fire and EMS resources access due to flooding, high winds, and downed wires. Four out of five FDNY-EMS Stations in Manhattan were evacuated during the storm as flooding began to surround stations in low-lying areas, including EMS Station 4 (South Street, location of Division 1 Headquarters which was moved to Downtown Brooklyn during the storm), Station 7 (Chelsea), Station 8 (Bellevue), and Station 10 (Spanish Harlem/Metropolitan Hospital). Station 16, located at Harlem Hospital, did not have to evacuate.

On October 29, National Guard troops arrived in Island Park, New York, as anecdotal accounts and earlier reports of a substation explosion were officially denied by a LIPA representative.

On October 30, a helicopter rescue crew airlifted five adults and a child from the roof of a Staten Island house which was nearly submerged by flooding waters.

On October 31, National Guard troops and local police were evacuating the last of 700 patients from Bellevue to other hospitals and local shelters.

On November 6, some of the state's residents that had been evacuated for Sandy were evacuated a second time due to a nor'easter that was expected to bring high winds, rain and possible snow to areas of New York.

== Aftermath ==
United States Secretary of Health and Human Services Kathleen Sebelius declared a public health emergency on October 31 for New York. In response, the Federal Emergency Management Agency (FEMA) sent 30 teams of workers into damaged areas of the New York region.

During a news conference on November 1, Mayor Bloomberg announced that most parks would reopen on November 3; that Coney Island, the Rockaways, and parts of Staten Island would get temporary centers for the distribution of meals and bottles of water at a time; that AT&T would bring cellphone-charging and cell service-enabled pods to certain areas of New York City; and that 400 members of the National Guard were to go door-to-door to deliver meals and supplies to elderly and home-bound residents. A relief fund was created for residents of Staten Island. Time Warner Cable donated $500,000 to the Mayor's Fund to Advance New York City, and $50,000 each to the Red Cross of Northeastern New York and the Red Cross of Northern New Jersey. They also sent out vehicles with mobile charging stations and free WiFi access points, as well as opened all its WiFi spots in the city.

United States Secretary of Homeland Security Janet Napolitano toured Staten Island on November 2. On that same day, the state of New York created a $100 million fund to help people hit hardest.

On November 3, the National September 11 Memorial & Museum was being pumped free of floodwater and reopened on the 6th. Five emergency mobile gas stations were deployed by the military on the same day, offering 10 free gallons per person.

Thousands of runners who came to the city to run the New York City Marathon met in Central Park on November 4; due to the marathon's being called off, many went to Staten Island to help storm victims.

On November 5, meteorologists began tracking a coastal nor'easter, that threatened cleanup and recovery efforts in the state on November 7 and 8. NYU Langone Medical Center, evacuated during the storm, began reopening on the same day, and about 750 workers resumed construction on Ground Zero. Governor Cuomo signed an executive order saying that displaced New Yorkers could vote in the 2012 United States elections at any polling place in the state.

On November 7, Governor Cuomo fired Steven Kuhr, the head of the New York Office of Emergency Management, after Cuomo discovered that Kuhr had sent Suffolk County workers to clear a tree in his Long Island driveway as other victims needed help. A day later, Cuomo said that the estimated storm damage in New York state was $33 billion. New York City and the counties of Nassau and Suffolk imposed "odd-even" gasoline rationing, as New Jersey had, to ease congestion and frustration at filling stations. The system began on November 9 in the wake of a shortage. Cuomo also temporarily waived certain taxes and pollution restrictions on fuel deliveries.

The South Ferry/Whitehall Street station, largely destroyed by the storm, was reopened on June 27, 2017, four years and eight months after Hurricane Sandy. The redesign included floodproofing, such as retractable floodgates. In the interim, service was rerouted to Rector Street.

=== Venue closures ===
New York City schools remained closed through Friday, November 2 with classes resuming Monday for most students; but as many as 40,000 stayed home until November 7. Fifty-seven schools were still flooded as of that date. Many colleges and universities and K-12 schools in the tri-state area also canceled classes.

The Statue of Liberty was closed October 29, a day after its grand reopening from a year-long renovation project. Both the statue and Ellis Island remained closed through 2012; the statue reopened July 4, 2013, while Ellis Island remained closed until 2014.

The New York State Office of Parks, Recreation and Historic Preservation closed all state parks on Long Island until further notice, due to downed trees, dangling branches, beach erosion, and damaged boardwalks.

On November 1, CBS News reported the 76 shelters opened initially were being consolidated down to 15.

On November 6, Bloomberg announced the closing of parks, playgrounds and beaches again for 24 hours starting at noon November 7, as the nor'easter neared. Also on November 6, John Jay High School in Brooklyn, being used as a shelter for Sandy victims, was shut down after about a dozen storm refugees came down with a stomach virus. Bloomberg said the school would be closed November 7 instead of opening for classes as scheduled, so it could be cleaned and then reopened.

=== Looting ===
Looters and burglars were arrested in Coney Island, the Rockaways, and other parts of New York City and Long Island which had been evacuated or damaged by the storm. Some posed as Con Ed workers to fool their victims; some other, would-be-looters posed as rescue workers. On November 2, it was reported that "on Long Island, looting has become such a problem on the south shore in the wake of superstorm Sandy that state police are on patrol." In addition to the looting of homes and stores, armed robberies, criminal siphoning of gasoline out of vehicle gas tanks, and thefts of generators were reported. Some New Yorkers ignored advice to evacuate in advance of the nor'easter of November 7, in favor of protecting their property. Thefts were averted by residents, some armed, who surprised those who had broken into their homes; by the National Guard; and by neighborhood watch groups.

On November 1, a St. Albans motorist was arrested on charges of menacing and criminal possession of a weapon after he tried to cut in line at a Mobil station on the corner of Astoria Boulevard and 43rd Street in Queens and pointed a pistol at another motorist who complained. Also, in Brooklyn, people argued at a Getty gas station. It was further reported that gasoline, in heavy demand for both vehicles and home generators, had become scarce and frustration with fuel supplies topped "the list of issues causing tensions to boil over in New Jersey, New York and Connecticut, the states hardest hit by power outages in the wake of superstorm Sandy." As of November 6, police reported 41 arrests in New York City stemming from fights at gas lines. This excluded the arrest of one teenager in East Setauket, who pulled a knife on a BP employee when told they were out of high-octane gas.

In the five days since Sandy first hit New York City, the NYPD reported a slight decline in the number of major felonies compared to the same period during the previous year. There was a 30% drop in robberies and felony assaults, as well as a single homicide compared to 7 homicides in 2011. Reported burglaries, however, had a small uptick from 267 in 2011 to 271 in Sandy's wake.

=== Political response ===
The hurricane damaged many homes beyond habitability. Governor Cuomo worked closely with President Barack Obama and with Governor Chris Christie of New Jersey, which was even more hard-hit, to come to their aid. Cuomo allowed New York voters, via a specific provision aimed at accommodating those displaced, to cast provisional ballots for the 2012 election anywhere in New York state. He also appointed a commission to examine the responses of New York utilities to damage caused by the storm, and to help lower the energy costs of residents affected by the damage. The Cuomo administration used $140 million of the funds originally allocated to this commission in order to pay for the broadcast of national TV ads encouraging businesses to return to New York after the disaster. Many have been critical of the effort, including former New York governor Eliot Spitzer, who called the ads "fluff" and "a waste of taxpayer money".

Governor Christie, a Republican, was criticized by fellow Republicans for his public praise of President Obama, a Democrat, during and after his post-Sandy visit to New Jersey. Although Christie endorsed Republican candidate Mitt Romney in the 2012 United States presidential election, critics complained that Christie's relationship with Obama following Sandy hurt Romney at the polls. Several years later, during Christie's own campaign for president, Republican opponents continued to raise the issue of his post-Sandy relationship with Obama. The incident was at least partly responsible for Christie's failure to win the Republican nomination for president.

=== Long-term mitigation ===
Various flood barriers within the New York City area have been proposed in order to prevent another flood surge from being as destructive as Hurricane Sandy's. One proposed barrier, the New York Harbor Storm-Surge Barrier would be located offshore and consist of multiple systems of barriers at the mouths of major waterways. Another plan calls for a "Big U", a system of flood barriers around the southern third of Manhattan.

In March 2019, mayor Bill de Blasio announced a Lower Manhattan Coastal Resiliency Plan, which would construct flood barriers around Lower Manhattan and possibly extend the shoreline at a cost of $10 billion. At the time, four of the project's phases had funding and were set to start construction between 2020 and 2021.

== See also ==
- 1821 Norfolk and Long Island Hurricane - a powerful hurricane in 1821 that moved up the East Coast of the United States
- Effects of Hurricane Ida in the Northeastern United States - a costly tropical cyclone in 2021 that caused flooding across the New York City area
