= Stephen Vincent =

Stephen Vincent may refer to:

- Stéphen Vincent (footballer) (born 1986), French footballer
- Steven Vincent (1955–2005), American author and journalist
- Steven Vincent (choreographer), American choreographer, dancer, teacher and entertainer
- Stephen Vincent (dancer) (born 1989), English dancer and choreographer
