= William Lawton =

William Lawton may refer to:

- William Stevens Lawton (1900–1993), United States Army general
- William Cranston Lawton (1853–1941), American author and educator
- Bill Lawton (1920–2008), English cricketer
