= Ronnie Robinson =

Ronnie Robinson may refer to:

- Ronnie Robinson (basketball) (1951–2004), American basketball player
- Ronnie Robinson (footballer) (born 1966), English former professional footballer
- Ronnie Robinson (roller derby) (1939–2001), American roller derby skater and coach

== See also ==
- Ronald Robinson (1920–1999), British historian
- Ron Robinson (disambiguation)
