= Alexander Greendale =

American dramatist (1910–1981)

- Born: May 25, 1910; Chicago, Illinois, U.S.
- Died: August 21, 1981 (aged 71); New York City, U.S.
- Education: University of Hawaii; Stanford University; Adelphi University
- Occupations: Playwright, civic leader
- Spouse: Ziva Greendale
- Children: 1 son, 1 daughter

Alexander Greendale (May 25, 1910 – August 21, 1981) was an American playwright and civic leader. He was an adjunct professor at Adelphi University, the editor of two books about housing, and the author of over 70 plays.

== Early life ==
Greendale was born on May 25, 1910, in Chicago. He graduated from the University of Hawaii, and he earned master's degrees from Stanford University and Adelphi University.

== Career ==
Greendale was an adjunct professor at his alma mater, Adelphi University. He was a Guggenheim Fellow in 1942. He was the director of the housing division of the American Jewish Committee from 1970 to 1977, when he became the executive director of the West Side Jewish Community Council. In 1972, he became the vice president of the Inter-religious New Communities Coalition, an organization whose aim was to build new towns in Israel. He edited two books about housing.

Greendale authored over 70 plays, including Dark Clouds, Buried Height, Fingers in the Fog, Little Italy, and Walk Into My Parlor.

== Personal life and death ==
With his wife Ziva, Greendale had a son and a daughter. They resided in Brooklyn.

Greendale died on August 21, 1981, in New York City, aged 71.
