= Malika Grayson =

Trinidadian-American engineer, speaker, and author

- Born: New York City, U.S.
- Education: Adelphi University (BS); Cornell University (MS, PhD)
- Scientific career
- Thesis: Urban wind: Impact of building geometry on the wind energy yield potential above the rooftops of buildings (2016)

Malika Grayson is a Trinidadian-American engineer, speaker, and author.

== Early life and education ==
Malika Grayson was born in Brooklyn, New York and raised in Trinidad and Tobago. She moved to New York in 2008, at the age of 19, to study physics at Adelphi University. During summer undergraduate research in the wave lab at Georgia Tech, she became interested in engineering. Grayson applied to PhD engineering programs at MIT, Cornell University, Columbia University, and Georgia Tech and was accepted to all four. After graduating with a Bachelor of Science degree in physics from Adelphi University, she ultimately chose to attend Cornell University so she could work with Professor Ephrahim Garcia, who was also of Caribbean descent. While at Cornell, Grayson focused her research on wind power and earned her Master of Science in 2014 and her PhD in 2016, both in mechanical engineering.

== Career ==
After receiving her PhD at Cornell, Grayson was hired at Northrop Grumman and worked in the rotational program for several years, before eventually becoming a program manager. In 2020, she released the book Hooded: A Black Girl's Guide to the Ph. D., which describes her experiences as a black woman in academia. That same year, she also founded STEMinist Empowered, an organization providing guidance and mentorship to women of color pursuing graduate degrees in STEM fields.
