= Dinelia Rosa =

Psychologist and Professor

- Born: New York City
- Education: Adelphi University
- Occupations: Psychologist & Professor

Dinelia Rosa is a Latina clinical psychologist who runs her own practice and works at the Columbia University Teachers College in New York.

== Biography ==
Dinelia Rosa was born in New York on the lower east side of Manhattan. She moved with her family back to Puerto Rico at the age of six. Her parents, who stayed in Puerto Rico, were there when Hurricane Maria struck, but were unharmed.

Rosa worked as a member of the Sesame Street Workshop advisory committee to develop a videotape program targeted for children from ages 3–8 and their parents. The program was called Helping you help children cope with stress and it was created to help children and their parents in the wake of 9/11.

== Education and academic work ==
Rosa was a first-generation college student in her family when she attended college at the University of Puerto Rico. where she completed her B.A. and first Masters in clinical psychology. Rosa earned her doctorate in clinical psychology from The Derner Institute at Adelphi University.

Prior to her current job as director of the Dean-Hope Center for Educational and Psychological Services at Teachers College in Columbia University, Rosa worked in several different clinical and educational arenas around New York City. At the Dean-Hope Center for Educational and Psychological Services Rosa helps in guiding students to gain work experience and provide services to people of multicultural backgrounds who vary in age.

She also has a small private practice where she does Spanish bilingual psychological and psychoeducational evaluations for children in foster care. In 2016 she was the first Latina to be president of the New York State Psychological Association (NYSPA), where she earlier received an award for service for helping start the Division of Culture, Race and Ethnicity. Rosa is a founding member of the Health Psychology rotation that is part of the Bellevue-NYU Internship Program.

Rosa also did work at NYU leading support groups for people with cardiac conditions. She has also done work at a New York nonprofit called Latino Share, where she has volunteered to help with services provided to women with breast and ovarian cancer. She also did work at the Breast Cancer and Infertility clinics in the Bellevue Medical Center in New York.

Rosa has also done a significant amount of work within the American Psychological Association. In 2016 she served as the president of the APA's Division of State, Provincial and Territorial Affairs. She is also a member of the APA Board of Professional Affairs. In addition, Rosa received a grant by the APA's Committee of Ethnic Minority Recruitment, Retention and Training to take on the important issues of linguistic minorities and organize clinical and counseling graduate students to speak Spanish. More recently, Rosa helped lead a workshop that was doing leadership development training to help people advance in their leadership roles within their respective state and territory psychological associations.

== Research and publications ==
Rosa does research involving different cross cultural treatment outcomes and grief among other topics. She has written multiple academic articles. One of her most cited ones is called A Randomized Trial of Mindfulness-Based Cognitive Therapy for Children: Promoting Mindful Attention to Enhance Social-Emotional Resiliency in Children. Rosa also took part in writing the popular psychology graduate school textbook titled Grief Therapy With Latinos: Integrating Culture for Clinicians. The textbook discusses culturally specific and diverse ways that grief manifests for Latinx people, and possible treatment methods and psychotherapy practices.

She was also asked to serve as associate editor for The New Encyclopedia on Death and Dying, which covers topics having to do with death across cultures and handling the grief and mourning that often comes along with it.

== Advocacy ==
Over the years Rosa has participated in and been invited to several different forums and panel discussions. In 2014 she spoke at a New York State Senate public forum for protecting LGBT youth from "conversion therapy" in New York State. The forum was created to prohibit mental health professionals from engaging in conversion therapy with minors. In the forum Rosa was brought in as a mental health professional and she spoke about how none of the major mental health institutions being discussed were supportive of conversion therapy.

Rosa also spoke at The New York City Cognitive Behavioral Therapy Association Black Lives Matter Panel Discussion. During the panel she spoke about new methods that clinicians can implore to help promote social justice by reflecting on their biases and learning how to relate to BIPOC (Black, Indigenous, People of Color) clients.

== Selected publications ==
- Vazquez, C. I., & Rosa, D. (1999). An understanding of abuse in the Hispanic older person: Assessment, treatment, and prevention. Journal of Social Distress and the Homeless, 8(3), 193–206.
- Miville, M. L., Rosa, D., & Constantine, M. G. (2005). Building Multicultural Competence in Clinical Supervision.
- Semple, R. J., Lee, J., Rosa, D., & Miller, L. F. (2010). A randomized trial of mindfulness-based cognitive therapy for children: Promoting mindful attention to enhance social-emotional resiliency in children. Journal of child and family studies, 19(2), 218–229.
- Rosa, D. (2019). New approaches to diversity in clinical work. Journal of clinical psychology, 75(11), 1979–1984.
- Rosa, D., & Fuentes, M. A. (2020). Grief, loss, and depression in Latino caregivers and families affected by dementia. In Caring for Latinxs with dementia in a globalized world (pp. 247–264). Springer, New York, NY.
