= Ron Bruder =

American businessman

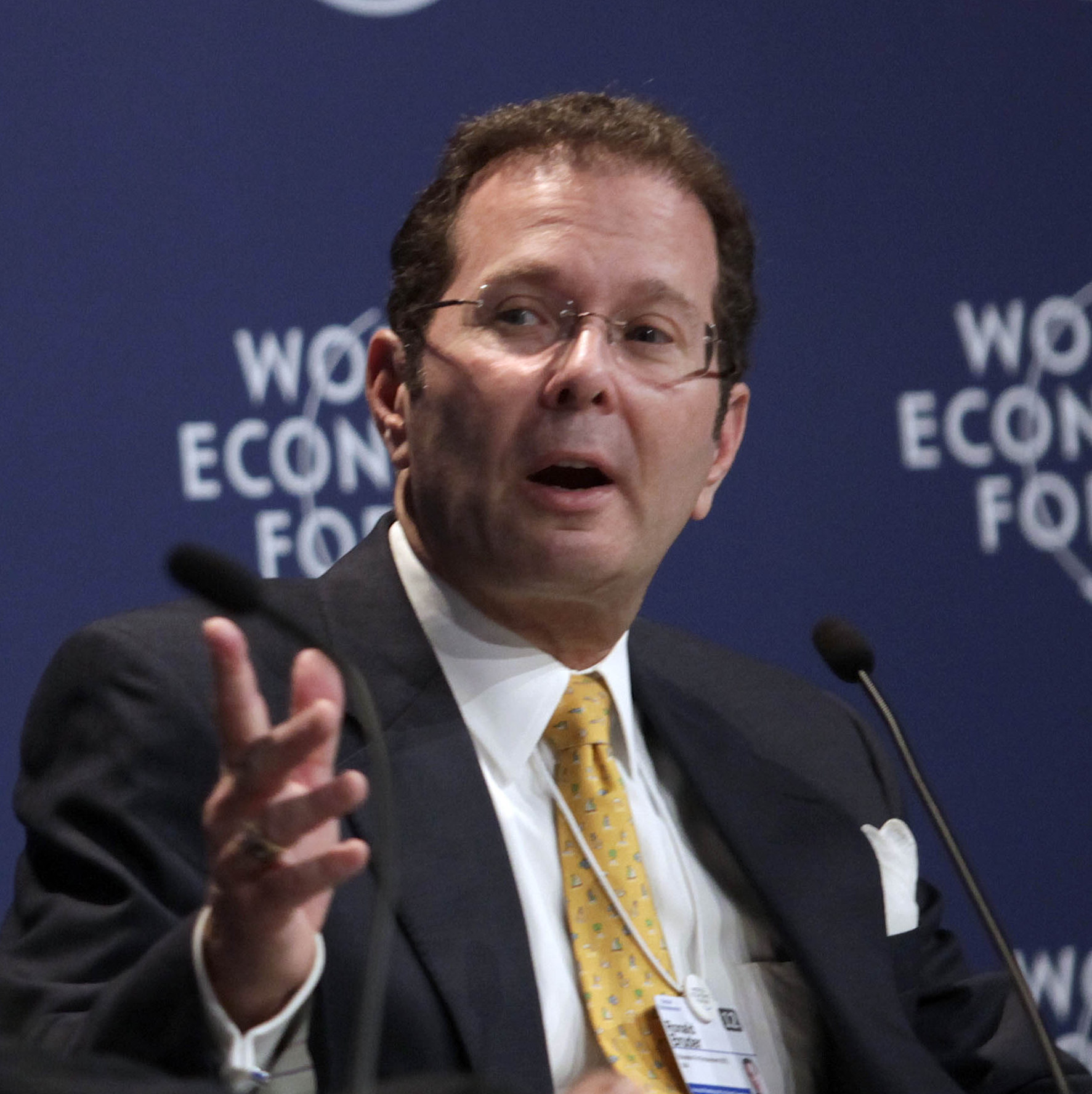
Bruder at the World Economic Forum Annual Meeting of the New Champions in 2012

Ron Bruder is an American entrepreneur and advocate for increased youth employment opportunities in the Middle East and North Africa. He is the founder of Education for Employment (EFE), a network of affiliated locally-run nonprofits which create public-private partnerships with employers to train youth in technical and soft skills and place them in jobs. The network has local affiliates in Jordan, Palestine, Yemen, Egypt, Morocco, Algeria, United Arab Emirates, Saudi Arabia and Tunisia and capacity-building support organizations in the United States and Spain. EFE has supported over 155,000 youth (59% women) to enter the world of work. In 2011 Bruder was named on the TIME 100 list of the 100 most influential people in the world. He lives in Westchester County, New York.

== Early life and education ==
Born in Brooklyn, Bruder was a part of a Jewish family that had migrated to the United States from Eastern Europe in the early half of the 20th century. Both of his parents worked, with his father an optometrist and his mother a remedial reading teacher. While working as an encyclopedia salesman at age 17, Bruder created a new, more efficient method for selling them, by hiring "economically disadvantaged mothers to do phone solicitations and employed their children to stuff envelopes through doorways all over Brooklyn."

At the age of 16, Bruder enrolled at Shimer College, a Great Books college then located in Mount Carroll, Illinois. He went on to earn a Bachelor's degree in Economics at Adelphi University, followed by a Master's Degree in Business Administration at New York University, and a Post-Master's Degree in Accounting and Taxation at Iona College.

== Career ==
Ron Bruder worked as a real estate developer for more than 30 years, and his earliest real estate activity involved converting an "electric generating plant in lower Manhattan to residential use." He created The Brookhill Group, a real estate company that built and turned around shopping centers and reclaimed brownfields. From there, he went on to found a "medical technology company and an oil-and-gas business, and he redeveloped a number of shopping malls".

It was after this that he started working with brownfields in partnership with Dames and Moore, a multibillion-dollar engineering company. Bruder invented a method of encouraging investment in tainted properties by capping clean-up costs and "securitizing the debt", which enabled The Brookhill Group to become "one of the largest buyers of distressed properties in the U.S." The group quickly obtained properties in more than 21 states.

The September 11 attacks were very traumatic for Bruder, as his eldest daughter was working near the World Trade Center and the event drove Bruder to "make a real impact" in something other than real estate. Working with experts and business owners in the Middle East and North Africa, Bruder investigated entrepreneurial responses to overcoming two key challenges in the Middle East and North Africa: the world's large youth bulge and the highest youth unemployment in the world. He believes that stable societies can only be built if youth have economic opportunity and jobs. After hiring the Brookings Institution to research methods of ameliorating the situation, along with traveling for several months in Middle Eastern countries, Bruder decided to create Education For Employment (EFE). His stated reason for doing so was,

I was very lucky in my life. Kids I meet in the Middle East have the same intellect and drive as I had but don't have the same opportunities ... We can make a radical difference in their lives. Once they have a job, they feel part of society. They can become a breadwinner and maybe support eight or nine people, including their siblings.

— Ron Bruder, CNN News

Bruder funded the creation of the foundation. Since its establishment in 2002, EFE has grown to become a network of locally-run and staffed affiliate organizations located across the Middle East and North Africa and supported by capacity-building nonprofits in the United States, the UAE, and Europe. In order to expand within each of the network's countries of operation, Bruder partnered with "local companies that provide funding and agree to hire a set number of graduates from his training programs". The first Middle Eastern affiliate, EFE-Jordan, was founded in Jordan in 2005, and the second, EFE-Palestine, in the Gaza Strip in 2006.

Bruder has become a major voice in the conversation on youth unemployment in the Middle East and North Africa. He has served as a delegate of the Council on Foreign Relations to the Jeddah Economic Forum, and a contributor to the US-Islamic World Forum in Doha, Qatar. He is frequently invited to share EFE's best practices at major international conferences and fora and in the media, including the Harvard Business Review. Bruder has also addressed audiences at the Clinton Global Initiative.

At the World Economic Forum Meeting of New Champions in 2012, Bruder was named Global Social Entrepreneurs of the Year by the Schwab Foundation. In 2014, he received the Creativity in Philanthropy Award from the New York University George H. Heyman Jr. Center for Philanthropy and Fundraising for his contributions to enhancing economic opportunities for women in the Middle East and North Africa. In 2011, Bruder appeared on the Time magazine list of 100 Most Influential People in the World and subsequently authored an op-ed for the magazine. In 2010, he received The Amy and Tony Polak 2010 Distinguished Advocate Award from the Anne Frank Center for his contributions to world education.
