= Jewish Community Council =

Jewish Community Councils (JCCs) are a form of local Jewish organization with the purpose of safeguarding Jewish rights, and assisting local residents. Jewish Community Councils were mostly formed in the 1940s.

== Activities ==
Jewish organizations are locally based, though they do play a role in coordinating activities with national Jewish organizations. JCCs focus on assisting local Jewish community and safeguarding Jewish rights. Recently, Jewish Community Councils have helped out locals in the aftermath of Hurricane Sandy.

== Jewish Community Councils ==
Jewish Community Councils are located in a number of cities in the United States. In New York City alone, there are 24 JCCs.

=== New York ===
According to the Metropolitan Council on Jewish Poverty's JCC listings, there are 24 Jewish Community Councils in New York City's five boroughs.

==== Bronx ====
- Bronx Jewish Community Council (BJCC)
- Concourse-North Bronx JCC
- Jewish Community Council of Co-op City
- Jewish Community Council of Pelham Parkway
- Jewish Community Council of Parkchester Unionport
- Jewish Community Council of Riverdale

==== Brooklyn ====
- Jewish Community Council of Bensonhurst (Bensonhurst COJO)
- Jewish Community Council of Boro Park
- Jewish Community Council of Crown Heights (CHJCC)
- Jewish Community Council of Greater Coney Island (JCCGCI)
- Jewish Community Council of Canarsie
- Jewish Community Council of Flatbush (Flatbush COJO)
- Jewish Community Council of Kings Bay
- Jewish Community Council of Marine Park
- Jewish Community Council of Shorefront
- Jewish Community Council of Williamsburg (Williamsburg UJO)

==== Manhattan ====
- Jewish Community Council of Washington Heights-Inwood
- United Jewish Council of the East Side (UJCES)
- Jewish Community Council of the Westside (Westside COJO)

==== Queens ====
- Jewish Community Council of Flushing
- Jewish Community Council of Rockaway Peninsula
- Jewish Community Council of Jackson Heights & Elmhurst
- Jewish Community Council of Queens

==== Staten Island ====
- Jewish Community Council of Staten Island (Staten Island COJO)

=== Australia ===
- Jewish Community Council of Victoria

=== Canada ===
- Jewish Community Council of Montreal (JCCM)
