= Jewish Community Council of Greater Coney Island =

U.S. nonprofit organization

The Jewish Community Council of Greater Coney Island (JCCGCI) is an American non-profit organization based in Brooklyn. JCCGCI was founded in 1973. The organization's Executive Director is Rabbi Moshe Weiner.

== Hurricane Sandy ==
In the wake of Hurricane Sandy, the central offices of the JCCGCI sustained heavy damage. A senior center run by the organization was also affected.

A grant was provided by the Robin Hood Foundation, following Sandy, to "replace the mobile home that houses the Mobile Crisis Intervention Center with a large trailer".

== See also ==
- Jewish Community Council
