= John B. Caddell =

Tanker ship built in 1941

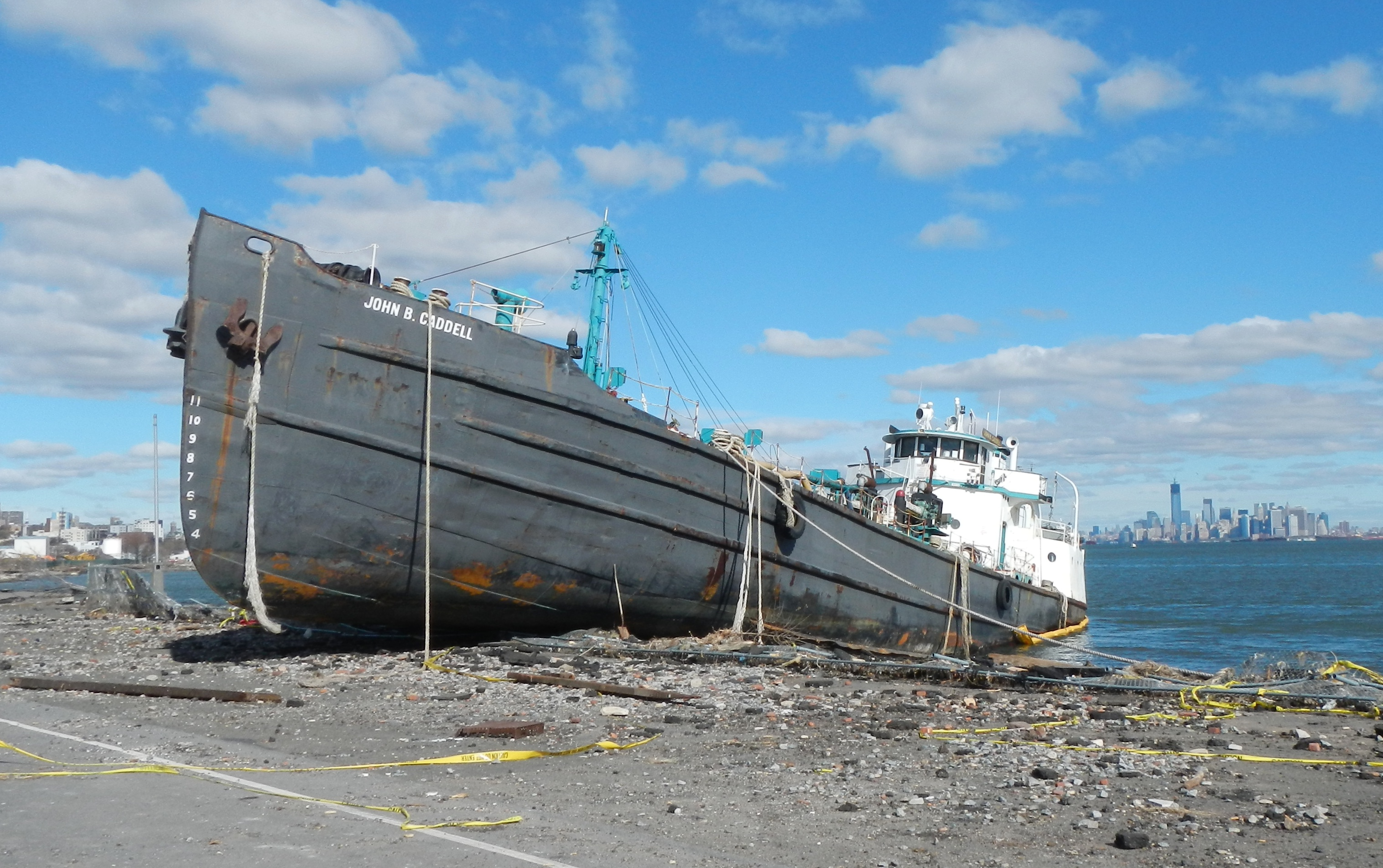
- John B. Caddell wrecked on Staten Island

History
- Builder: RTC Shipbuilding, Camden, New Jersey
- Yard number: 137
- Launched: 18 October 1941
- Completed: 31 December 1941 (delivered)
- Identification: U.S. Coast Guard Doc. No.: 241204; Call letters: WCX2215; IMO number: 5173204; MMSI number: 367010880
- Fate: Wrecked on Staten Island during Hurricane Sandy, 29 October 2012 and scrapped in April 2014
- Name: YO-140
- Acquired: 19 August 1942
- In service: 1942
- Out of service: 1946
- Fate: Sold

General characteristics
- Type: Tanker
- Tonnage: 712 gross register tonnage
- Length: 184.6 feet (56.3 m)
- Beam: 36.1 feet (11.0 m)
- Draft: 11.9 feet (3.6 m)

John B. Caddell, formerly YO-140, was a 712 gross register tonnage, 185-foot (56 m), previously United States-flagged water tanker. The ship was wrecked on Staten Island due to the effects of Hurricane Sandy in New York.

== History ==
The ship was originally built as the oil tanker John B. Caddell at RTC Shipbuilding of Camden, New Jersey, in 1941 for Chester A. Poling Inc. The ship was constructed as a single hull tankship, 184.6 feet (56.3 m) long, beam of 36.1 feet (11.0 m), and draft of 11.9 feet (3.6 m). She was documented by the United States Coast Guard (Official No. 241204) for coastwise unrestricted voyages.

The reason for the choice of the ship's name was not known. A Nova Scotian, John B. Caddell founded what is now the Caddell Dry Dock and Repair Co., Inc. in New York City in 1903, and the company is headed by his grandson John B. Caddell II.

On 19 August 1942, John B. Caddell was acquired by the U.S. Navy and was placed in service with the 5th Naval District at Norfolk, Virginia as yard oiler YO-140; she was restored to commercial service under her original name in 1946. She was last registered to Poling & Cutler Marine Transport Co, New York, though her U.S. Coast Guard documentation expired on 30 April 2011. She was sold to Nigerian interests in 2009 but prevented from sailing by the U.S. Coast Guard.

== Hurricane Sandy grounding ==
On 29 October 2012, during Hurricane Sandy, John B. Caddell was pulled from her moorings and driven ashore about a mile away onto Front Street in the Stapleton neighborhood of Staten Island, New York City. She suffered numerous hull breaches on her starboard side and one on her port side. The U.S. Coast Guard, assisted by the U.S. Army Corps of Engineers, took responsibility for her removal as an environmental and navigational hazard since no owner came forward.

In February 2013, a court declared the vessel abandoned and ordered her sold at auction. John B. Caddell was stored at a marine facility in Rossville until she was purchased for $25,000 on 6 June 2013, by Donjon Marine Co. Inc., owner of the storage yard, to be dismantled and scrapped.
