= William Cranston Lawton =

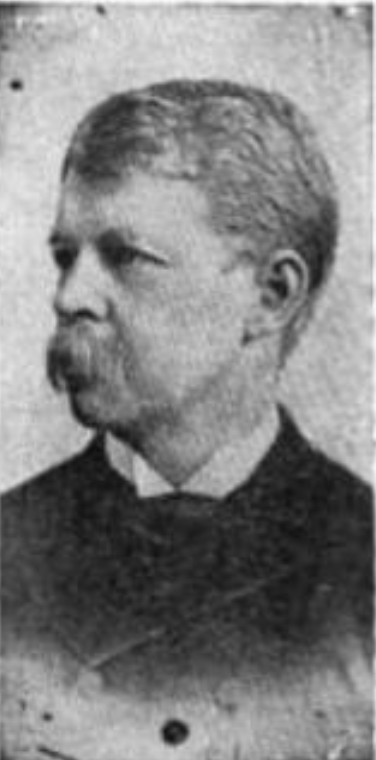
Lawton in 1906

William Cranston Lawton (May 22, 1853, New Bedford, Massachusetts – 1941) was an American author and educator.

He graduated from Harvard in 1873; studied at Berlin in 1882–83, the year before having been a member of the Assos expedition; from 1895 to 1907 was professor of Greek language and literature in Adelphi College, Brooklyn.

For four years he was the owner and principal of the School of the Lackawanna at Scranton, Pennsylvania. Thereafter he was engaged in literary work and lecturing. He was classical editor of, and the leading contributor to, Warner's Library of the World's Best Literature.

He wrote histories of Greek and Latin literature (1903); and his publications include:

- Three Dramas of Euripides (1889)
- Folia Dispersa (1895); a volume of poems
- Art and Humanity in Homer (1896)
- The New England Poets (1898)
- Successors of Homer (1898)
- The Hamadryad and Her Kinsfolk (Cover Title, Sewanee Review for October, 1900)
- Ideals in Greek Literature (1905)
- Study of American Literature (1902)
