= Ron Robinson (chemist) =

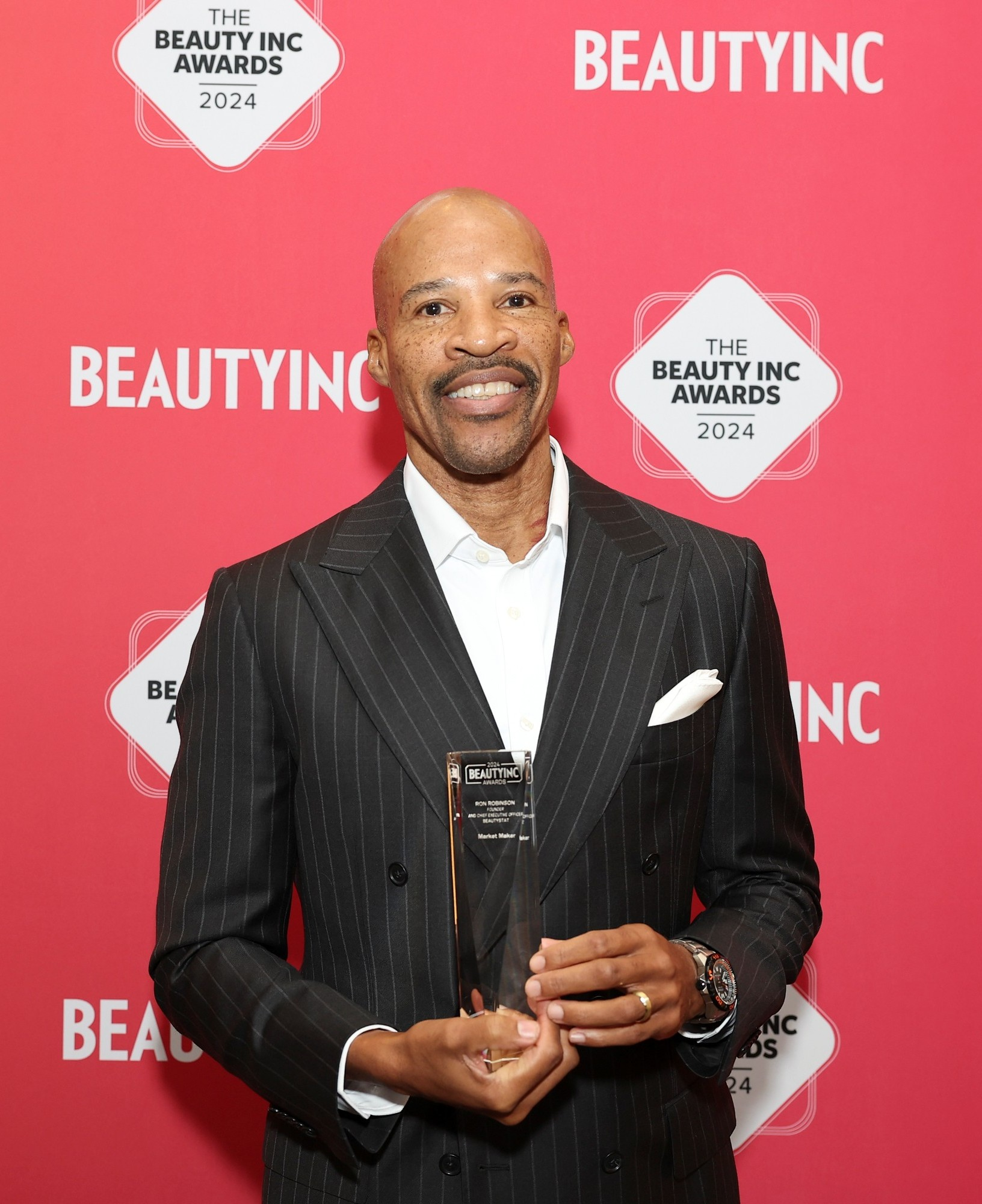
- Robinson in 2024
- Born: 1965 (age 60–61); Brooklyn, New York, U.S.
- Education: Adelphi University (B.S.)
- Occupation: Cosmetic chemist
- Years active: 1990–present
- Known for: BeautyStat, Rhode, and Yes Day

Ron Robinson (born 1965) is an American cosmetic chemist and researcher who is the founder of the skincare brand BeautyStat and the formulator of the teen skincare label Yes Day. He also helped launch Hailey Bieber's skincare line, Rhode, which was later acquired by e.l.f. Beauty for $1 billion.

== Early life and education ==
Robinson was born in Brooklyn, New York in 1965 to parents who emigrated to New York City from the Caribbean. He earned a B.S. in chemistry and biology from Adelphi University in 1987. He later attended the University of Medicine and Dentistry of New Jersey medical school (now part of Rutgers Health) before leaving after one year.

== Career ==
=== 1990–2008: Early career ===
After leaving medical school, Robinson joined Clinique (Estée Lauder) in 1990 as a cosmetic chemist and later promoted to senior chemist and then product development manager. He led the development of several anti-aging moisturizers that became best-sellers. He spent about a decade at Estée Lauder, including work with Aramis and La Mer, then held senior product development roles at L'Oréal Lancôme division, Revlon, and Avon through 2008.

=== 2009–present: BeautyStat, Rhode, and Yes Day ===
In 2009, Robinson founded BeautyStat as a blog focused on evaluating beauty products from a chemist's perspective. In 2013, BeautyStat expanded its operations and launched an e-commerce store. Later, Robinson also held resident expert roles at Allure and Refinery29. In 2016, he joined Influence Nation as managing director.

After receiving repeated questions about vitamin C instability, Robinson developed a method to stabilize pure L-ascorbic acid. He funded the research himself, spent five years on development, and obtained three patents. In 2019, he launched BeautyStat Cosmetics with the Universal C Skin Refiner, a serum containing 20% stabilized vitamin C.

In 2021, Hailey Bieber contacted Robinson after using BeautyStat's vitamin C serum and asked him to help develop her skincare line. He worked on formulations for over a year before Rhode launched in June 2022. He serves as cosmetic chemist-in-residence and sits on its skincare advisory board. Rhode was acquired by e.l.f. Beauty in May 2025 for about $1 billion.

In 2022, BeautyStat expanded to Ulta Beauty stores across the United States and raised a Series A round led by VMG Partners and True Beauty Ventures. Notable BeautyStat products include the Universal C Skin Refiner SPF 50, a peptide moisturizer, a coconut milk serum, and a vitamin C lip serum with mineral SPF 30.

In October 2025, Robinson worked as formulator with Coco Granderson to launch Yes Day, a skincare brand for teens and tweens.

As of 2026, Robinson also serves on the advisory board of Adelphi University.
