= Elizabeth Rhodes Jackson =

American writer

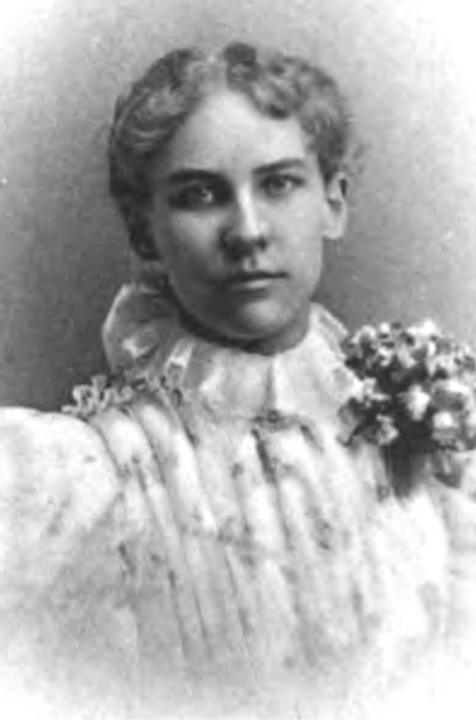
- Jackson, from the 1897 yearbook of Cornell University
- Born: Elizabeth Meserole Rhodes; July 6, 1875; Brooklyn, New York, U.S.
- Died: June 30, 1955 (aged 79); Boston, Massachusetts, U.S.
- Occupations: Writer, editor

Elizabeth Meserole Rhodes Jackson (July 6, 1875 – June 30, 1955) was an American writer and magazine editor. She wrote popular children's books and stories, set in Boston.

== Early life and education ==
Jackson was born in Brooklyn, New York, the daughter of Foster Rhodes and Anna J. Hatfield Rhodes. She was the valedictorian of the Class of 1894 at Adelphi Academy, and she graduated from Cornell University in 1897. At Cornell she was coxswain of the school's first women's rowing team, and was a member of the Kappa Kappa Gamma sorority.

== Career ==
Before she married, Rhodes taught English at Adelphi Academy, and was secretary of the Inter-Municipal Research Committee of the New York Association for Household Research. Jackson was exchange editor and then editor-in-chief of The Key, the official national publication of Kappa Kappa Gamma. She was president of the Cornell Women's Club in Boston and a member of the Boston Authors Club.

Jackson's 1923 children's novel It's Your Fairy Tale, You Know is a fantasy set in her present-day Boston, which features fairies, pixies, a giant, a genie, and a kobold. "The story is entertainingly written and the format pleasing," wrote one reviewer. Her 1947 book Beacon Hill Children included several short stories that were widely anthologized, including "Christmas Eve at Reginald's", which involves a dog holding a holiday open house for his human friends.

== Publications ==
- "Leaving the Nest" (1894, class song)
- "The Professor's Experiment" (Argosy, 1901, short story)
- "The Postern Gate" (The Junior Munsey, 1901, short story)
- It's Your Fairy Tale, You Know (1922, novel)
- Beacon Hill Children (1947, book)
  - includes the stories "Christmas Eve at Reginald's", "Streets of Memories", "The Rule of Three" "Old Houses" and "The Holiday Cup"

== Personal life ==
Rhodes married architect Ralph Templeton Cushman Jackson in 1907. They had four children. Their son Foster Rhodes Jackson became a noted architect in Southern California. Their daughter Ralph Dighton Jackson (later known as May Wood) was a poet and editor. Jackson died in 1955, at the age of 79, in Boston, Massachusetts.
