= Steven Vincent (choreographer) =

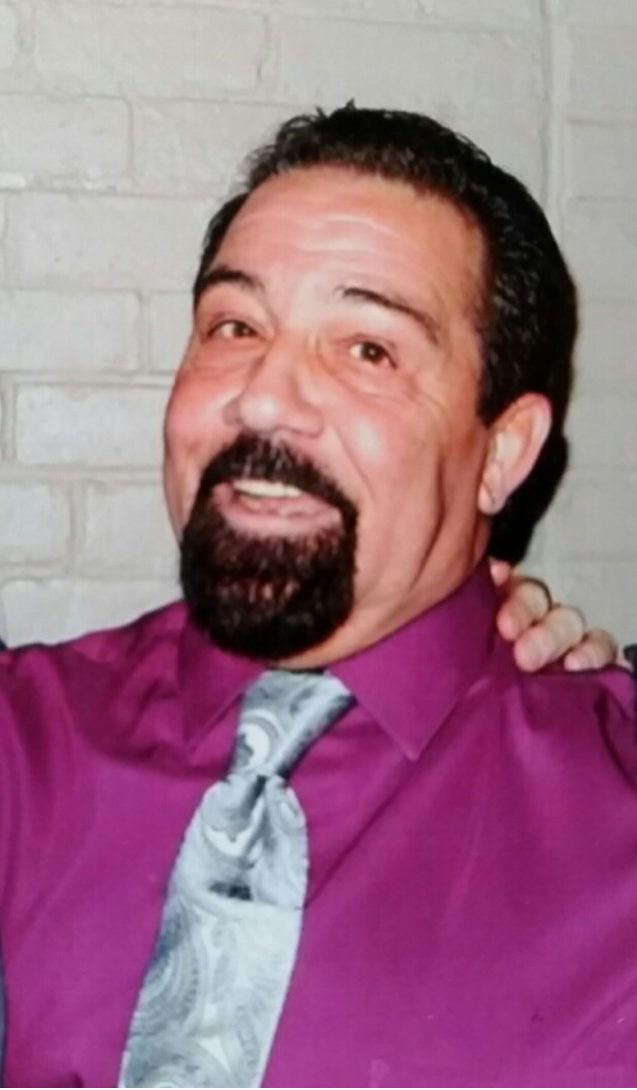
- Vincent in 2014
- Born: Stephen Vincent DiGiorgio Jr. Schenectady, New York
- Education: Adelphi University
- Occupations: Choreographer; Dancer; Teacher
- Partner: Roye (Baba) Schell
- Parent(s): Emma DiGiorgio; Stephen DiGiorgio

Steven Vincent (born Stephen Vincent DiGiorgio Jr.) is an American choreographer, dancer, teacher and entertainer. He is best known for his role in the 1969 Broadway play, George M! with Mickey Rooney and as a recurring choreographer at the Players Theater in Sarasota, Florida.

== Early life and education ==
He was born in Schenectady, New York to Emma and Stephen DiGiorgio. He graduated from Mt. Pleasant High School in 1968, where he directed and choreographed an interpretive montage of Broadway shows called, Right Footed Left Overs II. He graduated from Adelphi University, majoring in dance and minoring in dramatic arts.

== Career ==
In 1969, Vincent was cast as part of the dance ensemble in the traveling musical George M!. The musical starred Mickey Rooney and lasted for two years. In December 1971, he opened the play Wild and Wonderful alongside Ann Reinking as part of the original Broadway cast. The show is best known for opening and closing at the Lyceum Theater on the same night. In the early 1970s, Vincent became the Social Director at the Adler Hotel of Sharon Springs, New York. In 1973, he partnered on a purchase of the Bronx House in Sharon Springs, New York. He lived there with his life-partner, artist of Mazey & Schell Inc. and three children.

In 1987, Vincent relocated to Sarasota, Florida. He opened Steven Vincent's The Dance Studio in 1989. He also founded Movement Magic, an in-home exercise program for senior citizens of the Tampa Bay area. In October 1996, The Dance Studio merged with The Players Performing Art School to begin a three discipline school of the arts for the Sarasota community.

=== Notable students ===
He taught dance and voice to Ashley Rose Orr, who played Gretl in Broadway's The Sound of Music at age 6. He also directed Shanley Caswell as a Players Kid. Vincent directed Teresa Stanley, cast member of Broadway's Rock of Ages, in the community theater production of Pippin.

=== Notable productions ===
In 2007, Vincent directed The Players Theater production of 42nd Street.

== Personal life ==
Vincent's life partner Roye (Baba) Schell died in November 2011. He lives in Sarasota with his family. His mother, Emma, is 103 years old.
