= Effects of Hurricane Sandy in Maryland and Washington, D.C. =

Hurricane Sandy
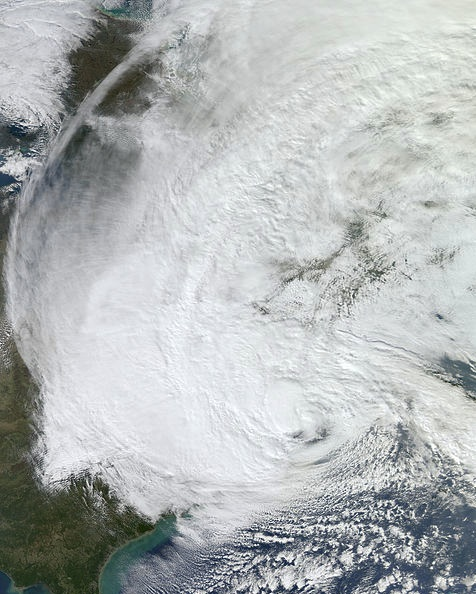
- Satellite image of Sandy a few hours before landfall

Meteorological history
- Formed: October 27, 2012 (First rainbands begin to affect the region)
- Extratropical: October 29, 2012
- Dissipated: November 2, 2012 (Dissipated as extratropical cyclone)

Tropical storm
- 1-minute sustained (SSHWS/NWS)
- Highest winds: 60 mph (95 km/h)
- Highest gusts: 70 mph (110 km/h)

Overall effects
- Fatalities: At least 11 total
- Damage: $42.6 million (2012 USD)
- Areas affected: Maryland, Washington, D.C.
- Part of the 2012 Atlantic hurricane season
- History: Meteorological history; Effects: Greater Antilles; United States; Maryland and Washington, D.C.; New Jersey; New York; New England; Canada; Other wikis: Commons: Sandy images

The effects of Hurricane Sandy in Maryland and Washington, D.C., included tropical storm force sustained winds with isolated gusts to hurricane force, plus significant mountain snow and coastal flooding.

== Preparations ==
=== Washington, D.C. ===
On October 26, Washington, D.C., Mayor Vincent Gray declared a state of emergency. That same day the governors of Pennsylvania, Maryland, and Virginia also declared states of emergency in preparation of the approaching storm.

The United States Office of Personnel Management announced federal offices in the Washington, D.C., area would be closed to the public on October 29–30. In addition, Washington, D.C., Metro service, both rail and bus, was canceled on October 29 due to expected high winds, the likelihood of widespread power outages, and the closing of the federal government. President Obama declared a state of emergency for the District of Columbia. The Smithsonian Institution closed for the day of October 29.

=== Maryland ===
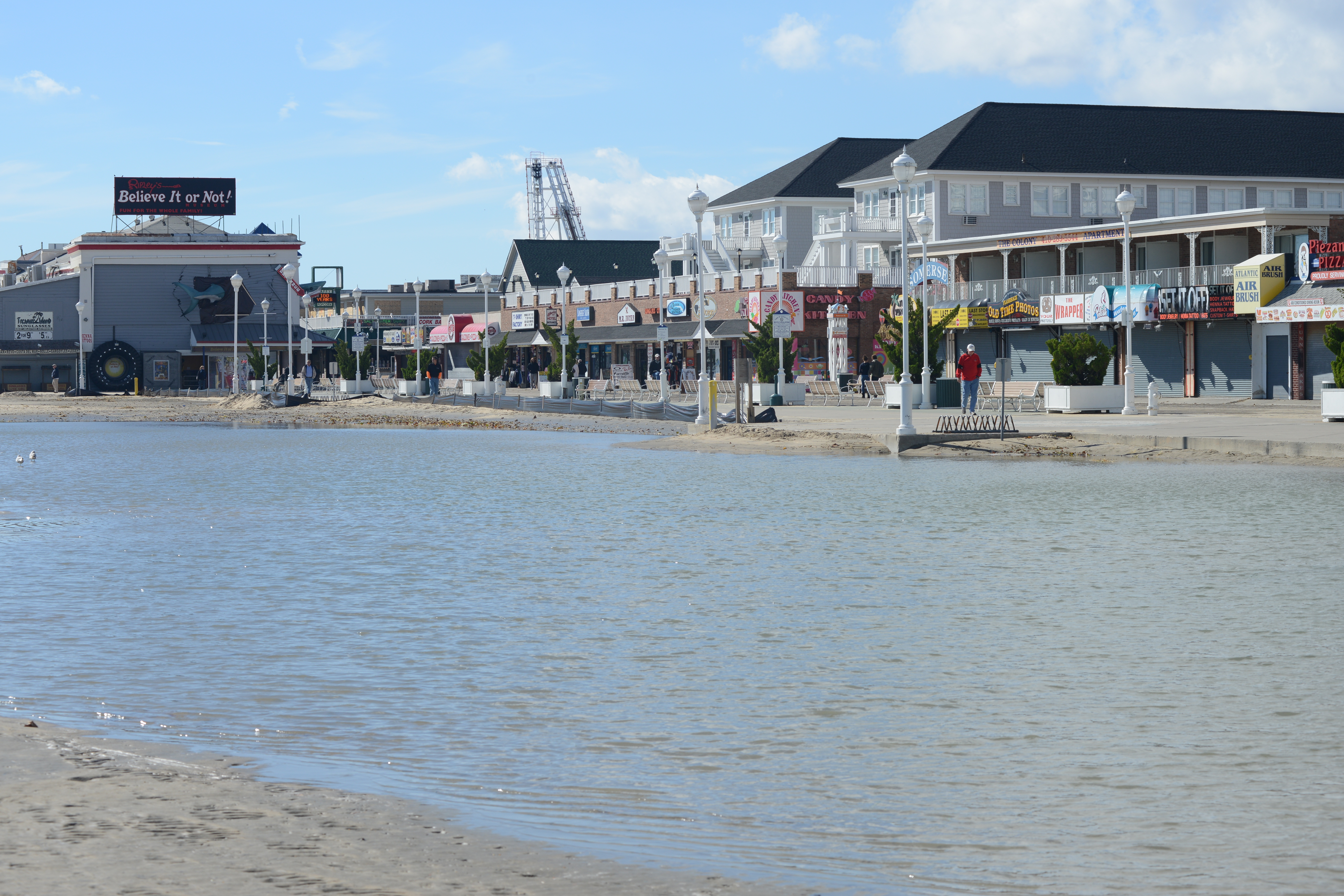
Beach erosion in Ocean City

On October 27, Smith Island residents were evacuated with the assistance of the Maryland Natural Resources Police, Dorchester County opened two shelters for those in flood prone areas, and Ocean City initiated Phase I of their Emergency Operations Plan. Baltimore Gas and Electric Co. has been putting workers on standby and making plans to bring in crews from other states. On October 28, President Obama declared an emergency in Maryland and signed an order authorizing the Federal Emergency Management Agency to aid in disaster relief efforts. Also, numerous areas were ordered to be evacuated including part of Ocean City, Worcester County, Wicomico County, and Somerset County. As of October 27, 2012, there are serious possibilities that more than a hundred million tons of dirty sediment mixed with tree limbs and debris floating behind Conowingo Dam may be eventually poured into the Chesapeake Bay, posing a potential environmental threat.

The Maryland Transit Administration canceled all service for October 29 and October 30. The cancellations applied to buses, light rail, Amtrak and MARC train service. On October 29, six shelters opened in Baltimore and early voting was cancelled for the day. Maryland Insurance Commissioner Therese M. Goldsmith activated an emergency regulation requiring pharmacies to refill prescriptions regardless of their last refill date. On October 29, the Chesapeake Bay Bridge over the Chesapeake Bay and the Millard E. Tydings Memorial Bridge and Thomas J. Hatem Memorial Bridge over the Susquehanna River were closed to traffic in the midday hours.

== Impact ==
=== Washington, D.C. ===
The Supreme Court did not convene on Tuesday, October 30. The United States Government Office of Personnel Management closed federal offices in the Washington, D.C., area to the public on October 29 and 30 as well; they were reopened on October 31. Schools were closed for a second day as well. MARC train and Virginia Railway Express did not run October 30, but on that day Metro rail and bus service began at 2 p.m., with all lines operating on a Sunday schedule until the system closes.

=== Maryland ===
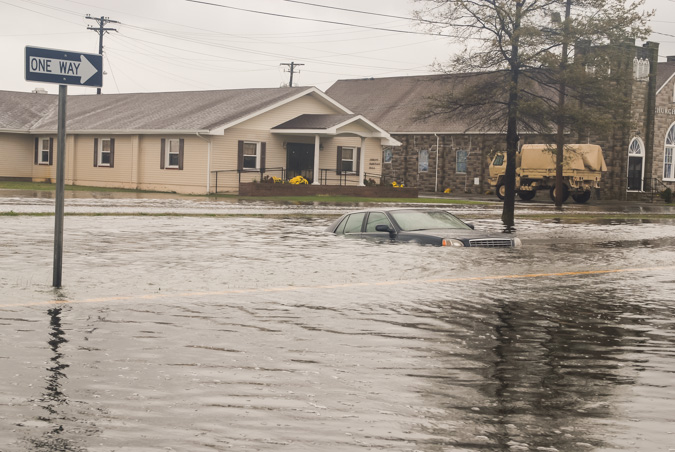
Flooding in Crisfield

At least 100 feet of a fishing pier at the beach resort of Ocean City was destroyed. Governor Martin O'Malley said the pier is "half-gone." Due to high winds, the Chesapeake Bay Bridge was closed, and subsequently opened. The Millard E. Tydings Memorial Bridge on I-95 across the Susquehanna River was closed.

Due to flooding, the Mayor of the City of Salisbury instituted a Civil Emergency and instituted a curfew beginning at 7pm on October 29 through 10am October 30. I-68 in far western Maryland and northern West Virginia closed due to impassable roads from heavy snow. Up to 28 in (71 cm) of snow fell in Garrett County, Maryland, resulting in eighty percent of the county losing power. Multiple vehicles are stranded on the interstate and the National Guard was sent out to help. Workers in Howard County, Maryland tried to stop a sewage overflow caused by a power outage October 30. Raw sewage spilled at a rate of 2 million gallons per hour. It was unclear how much sewage had flowed into the Little Patuxent River. The Chesapeake Bay Bridge, which had been closed because of Sandy's high winds, reopened the morning of October 30.

As of the morning of November 2, 28,600 were without power, down from 365,700.

As of late night November 2, there were 11 Hurricane Sandy related fatalities.

As of November 3, Somerset County had an initial damage estimate of $40 million. Damage estimates in Maryland are $42.6 million.

== See also ==
- Ash Wednesday Storm of 1962, last storm before Sandy to cause major flooding on the Delmarva Peninsula
- Hurricane Irene, last hurricane to hit the region
- Hurricane Isabel, similar storm with severe storm surge flooding in the Chesapeake Bay basin
- June 2012 North American derecho, last major power outage in the region
