= Effects of Hurricane Sandy in Canada =

Hurricane Sandy
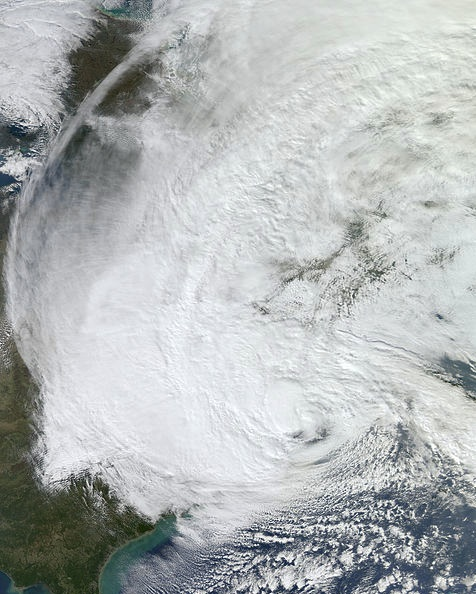
- Satellite image of Sandy near landfall

Tropical storm
- 1-minute sustained (SSHWS/NWS)
- Highest winds: 60 mph (95 km/h)
- Highest gusts: 70 mph (110 km/h)

Overall effects
- Fatalities: 1 direct, 1 indirect
- Damage: $100 million (2012 USD)
- Areas affected: Atlantic Canada, Quebec, Ontario, Nunavut
- Part of the 2012 Atlantic hurricane season
- History: Meteorological history; Effects: Greater Antilles; United States; Maryland and Washington, D.C.; New Jersey; New York; New England; Canada; Other wikis: Commons: Sandy images

The effects of Hurricane Sandy in Canada included rainfall and high waves across a large portion of eastern Canada.

== Preparations ==
The Canadian Hurricane Centre issued its first preliminary statement on Hurricane Sandy on October 25, 2012. The statement was aimed at all of Eastern Canada from Southern Ontario to the Canadian Maritimes. Forecasters predicted that Sandy would bring rain to Ontario and Quebec, possibly turning to snow in Central Ontario.

On October 29, Environment Canada issued severe wind warnings for the Great Lakes and St. Lawrence Valley corridor, from Southwestern Ontario as far as Quebec City. Environment Canada also predicted that Hurricane Sandy could bring "significant" snow to parts of Central and Northern Ontario.

Additional warnings were issued by the Canadian Red Cross, Emergency Management Ontario, and numerous Conservation Authorities, which warned residents in Ontario to be prepared for flooding and power outages in the wake of the storm.

On October 30, Environment Canada issued storm surge warnings along the mouth of the St. Lawrence River, including the Gaspé Peninsula and Sept-Îles. Rainfall warnings were issued for the Charlevoix region in Quebec, as well as for Charlotte County, New Brunswick, Yarmouth County, Shelburne County, and Queens County in Nova Scotia, as 50 to 70 millimetres of rain can be expected. Freezing rain warnings were issued for parts of Northern Ontario.

On October 31, rainfall warnings were posted for all counties of New Brunswick that are not adjacent to Maine, including the cities of Saint John and Moncton, as well as Halifax and central Nova Scotia. Environment Canada also issued a wind warning for the Northern Quebec community of Umiujaq.

On November 1, as the remnants of Sandy marched towards Northern Canada, a Wreckhouse Wind warning was posted for Channel-Port aux Basques, Newfoundland and Labrador, while blizzard warnings were issued for extreme northwestern Quebec communities such as Salluit and Ivujivik. Snowfall warnings were also posted for the communities of southern Baffin Island in Nunavut such as Kimmirut, Pangnirtung and Iqaluit.

== Impact ==
As of early October 30, most of Southern Ontario was experiencing sustained winds of tropical storm force from Windsor to Ottawa, with gusts to 80 km/h (50 mph) or higher. One woman was killed after being struck by a piece of flying debris, a Staples Inc. sign, in the Junction neighbourhood in the west end of Toronto. The strongest ground-level winds were along Lake Huron and Georgian Bay, where gusts were measured at 105 km/h (65 mph). A 121 km/h (75 mph) gust was measured on top of the Bluewater Bridge.

At least 145,000 customers across the province had lost power as of the morning of October 30. Streetcar wires along several routes were torn down in Toronto. Hundreds of flights from Toronto Pearson International Airport, Ottawa Macdonald–Cartier International Airport, and Billy Bishop Toronto City Airport (Toronto Island) had also been cancelled, mostly destined for Atlantic Canada and the eastern seaboard of the United States. A Bluewater Power worker was electrocuted in Sarnia while working to restore power.

Around 49,000 homes and businesses lost power in Quebec during the storm, with nearly 40,000 of those in the Laurentides region of the province, as well as more than 4,000 customers in the Eastern Townships and 1,700 customers in Montreal. Over 150 flights had been cancelled at Montreal-Pierre Elliott Trudeau International Airport.

The Emerald Princess, a cruise ship carrying 3,780 passengers and 1,200 crew members, sought shelter at Saguenay, Quebec, which was just north of Sandy's northern edge and has a naturally protected harbour. It is the largest ship ever to have docked at Saguenay.

Around 14,000 customers in Nova Scotia lost power during the height of the storm.

An F0 tornado was also reported in Mont-Laurier, Quebec on October 31 with minimal damage, one of the latest tornadoes in the year ever recorded in Canada and one of very few to be linked to a tropical cyclone (or the remnants thereof).
