= Effects of Hurricane Sandy in the Greater Antilles =

Hurricane Sandy
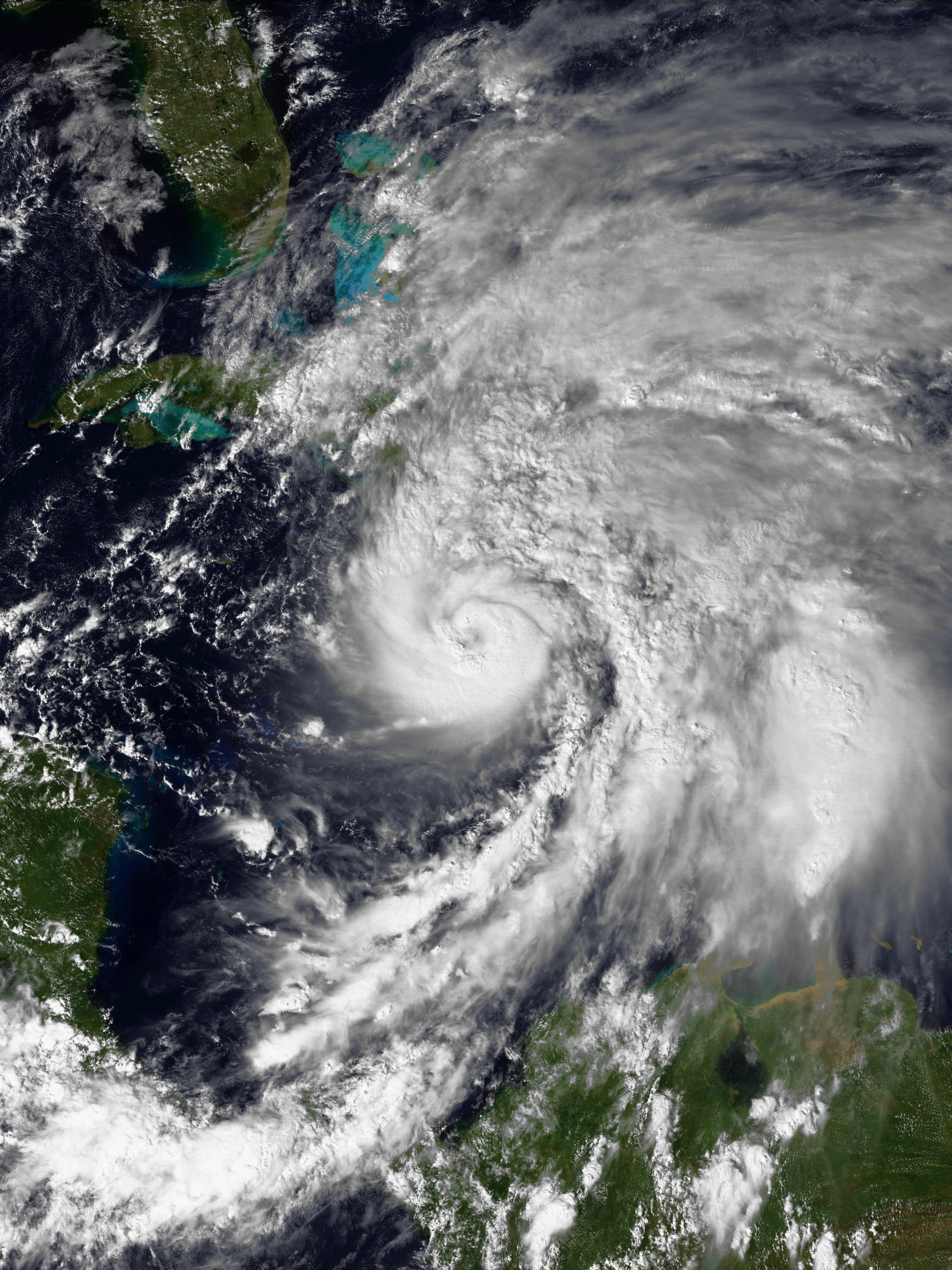
- Satellite image of Sandy shortly before landfall in Jamaica on October 24

Meteorological history
- Formed: October 22, 2012 (Formation, first waves begin to affect Jamaica)
- Dissipated: October 26, 2012 (Final rainbands move away)

Category 3 major hurricane
- 1-minute sustained (SSHWS/NWS)
- Highest winds: 115 mph (185 km/h)
- Highest gusts: 140 mph (220 km/h)
- Lowest pressure: 954 mbar (hPa); 28.17 inHg

Overall effects
- Fatalities: 120 total (70 direct, 50 indirect)
- Damage: $2.88 billion (2012 USD)
- Areas affected: Jamaica, Cuba, Haiti, Dominican Republic, Puerto Rico
- Part of the 2012 Atlantic hurricane season
- History: Meteorological history; Effects: Greater Antilles; United States; Maryland and Washington, D.C.; New Jersey; New York; New England; Canada; Other wikis: Commons: Sandy images

The Greater Antilles were severely impacted by Hurricane Sandy, whose effects were spread over five countries, including Jamaica, Haiti, Cuba, the Dominican Republic and Puerto Rico, and included at least 120 deaths, primarily on October 24 and 25, 2012. Sandy formed in the central Caribbean Sea south of Jamaica on October 22 as part of the 2012 Atlantic hurricane season. It later struck Jamaica as an intensifying hurricane and then Cuba as a major hurricane. Total damages equaled up to nearly $3 billion (2012 USD).

== Preparations ==
After the storm became a tropical cyclone on October 22, the Government of Jamaica issued a tropical storm watch for the entire island. Early on October 23, the watch was replaced with a tropical storm warning and a hurricane watch was issued. At 3 p.m. UTC, the hurricane watch was upgraded to a hurricane warning, while the tropical storm warning was discontinued. Shortly after Jamaica issued its first watch on October 22, the Government of Haiti issued a tropical storm watch for Haiti. By late October 23, it was modified to a tropical storm warning. The Government of Cuba posted a hurricane watch for the Cuban Provinces of Camagüey, Granma, Guantánamo, Holguín, Las Tunas, and Santiago de Cuba at 1500 UTC on October 23. Only three hours later, the hurricane watch was switched to a hurricane warning.

== Impact ==
=== Jamaica ===
Sandy was the first direct hit by the eye of a hurricane on Jamaica since Hurricane Gilbert 24 years ago. The storm hit Jamaica as a category 1 hurricane. Extensive damage was reported on the island. Trees and power lines were snapped and shanty houses were heavily damaged, both from the winds and flooding rains. More than 100 fishermen were stranded in outlying Pedro Cays off Jamaica's southern coast. Stones falling from a hillside crushed one man to death as he tried to get into his house in a rural village near Kingston. The country's sole electricity provider, the Jamaica Public Service Company, reported that 70 percent of its customers were without power. Looters shot and wounded a police official as he led a group of officers through Craig Town, a section of West Kingston. More than 1,000 people went to shelters, the Office of Disaster Preparedness said. Jamaican authorities closed the island's international airports, and police ordered 48-hour curfews in major towns to keep people off the streets and deter looting. Cruise ships changed their itineraries to avoid the storm, which made landfall the afternoon of October 24 near the capital, Kingston.

The day after the storm, government officials went on an aerial tour of the rural eastern areas of the island. Parliament member Daryl Vaz reported that most buildings had lost their roofs, in addition to widespread damage to banana crops. Approximately 70 percent of the island lost power because of Sandy, and schools in the Kingston area would likely remain closed for a week. Resorts in Montego Bay and Negril sustained no major damage, and cruise ship terminals reopened to vessels after a 24-hour suspension of services. Authorities warned that the extent of the damage is not clear, since some major roads remained impassable, and it would likely be weeks before life in most areas returned to normal. Damage totaled $16.5 million throughout the country.

=== Haiti ===
In Haiti, which was still recovering from the effects of the 2010 earthquake, at least 104 people have died, and an estimated 200,000 were left homeless as of October 29, as a result of four days of ongoing rain from Hurricane Sandy. Reports of significant damage to Port-Salut were received as rivers overflowed their banks. In the nation's capital, Port-au-Prince, whole streets were flooded by the heavy rains and "the whole south of the country is underwater". Most of the tents and buildings in the city's sprawling refugee camps and the Cité Soleil neighborhood were flooded or leaking, a repeat of what happened earlier in the year during the passage of Hurricane Isaac. The United Nations warned that flooding and unsanitary conditions may reignite the ongoing cholera epidemic which begins shortly after the quake. So far, 700,000 people have fallen ill and killed more nearly 8,000 within Haiti and neighboring Dominican Republic. The storm also led to severe crop losses, seriously challenging food security on an already food insecure island nation, making the poor and those without access to food that much more susceptible to lingering effects, the country would be making an appeal for emergency aid. A United Nations official said the storm left as many as 1 million people in Haiti facing food shortages.

=== Dominican Republic ===
San Juan radar loop on October 23, showing the outer rainbands of Sandy affecting the Dominican Republic and Puerto Rico

In the Dominican Republic two people were killed and 8,755 people evacuated as officials said the rains were expected to continue until at least October 27. Travelling by vehicle was very hard in places as some roads had high water levels. An employee of CNN estimated 70% of the streets in Santo Domingo were flooded. Some cars were underwater, and people with trucks were charging motorists $5 to pull their vehicles out, while others were doing it for free.

=== Cuba ===
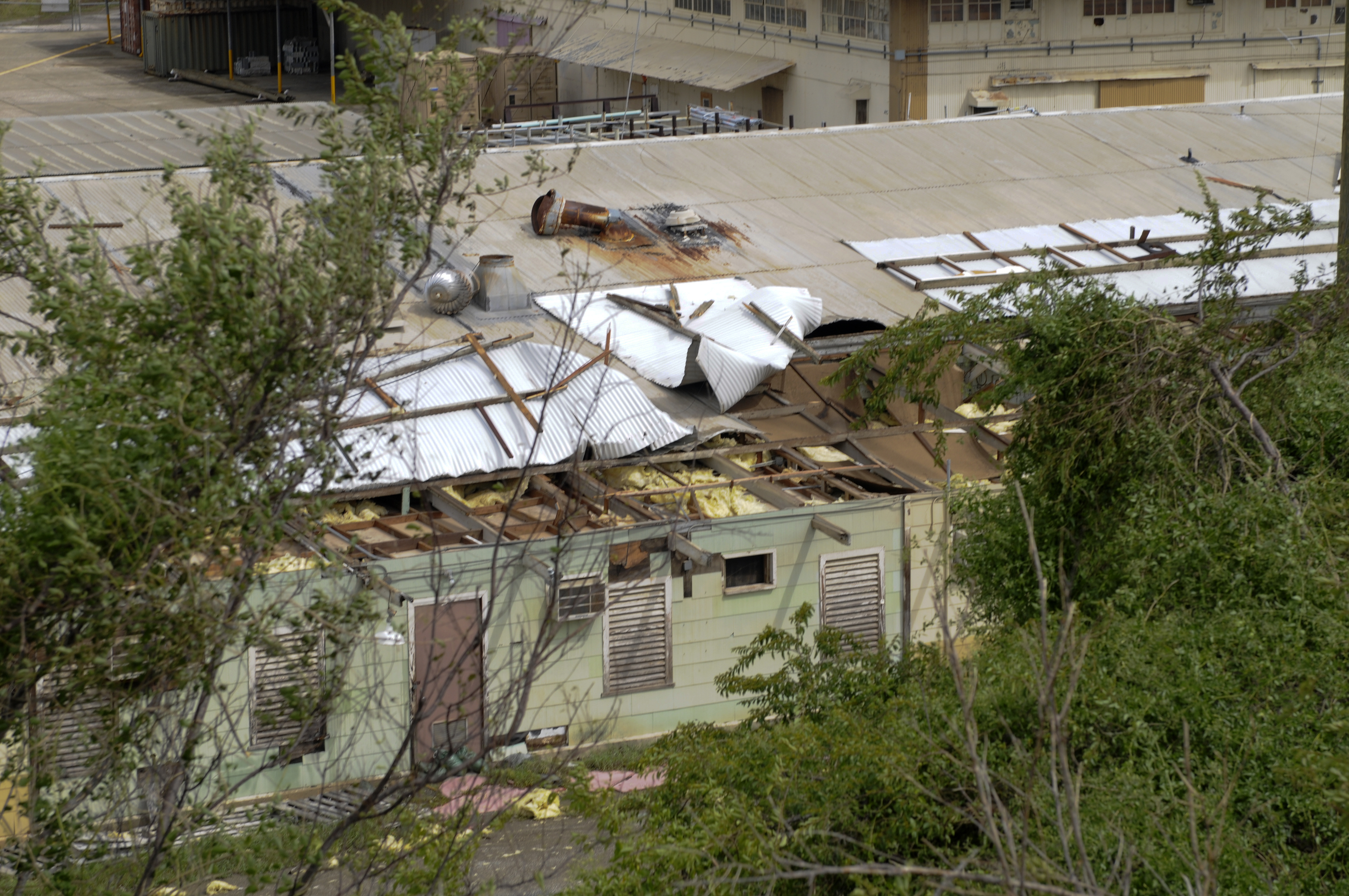
Hurricane Sandy damage in Guantanamo Bay

Hurricane Sandy strengthened into a Category 3 hurricane before hitting Cuba. At least 55,000 people had been evacuated principally because of expected flooding from rains that could total up to 510 millimetres (20 in) in some places and a storm surge the Cuban weather service said was already beginning along the southeastern coast around midnight EDT. Sandy made landfall just west of Santiago de Cuba, the country's second-largest city, as a Category 3 hurricane, with the strong eastern eyewall passing directly over the city. The eye of the storm came ashore just west of the city with waves up to 8.8 meters (29 feet) and a two-metre (6 ft) storm surge that caused extensive coastal flooding.

Reports from the area after the passage of Sandy spoke of widespread damage, particularly to Santiago de Cuba. Throughout the province, 132,733 homes were damaged, of which 15,322 were destroyed and 43,426 lost their roof. Electricity and water services had been knocked out, and most of the trees in the city had either been ripped off their roots or had lost all their leaves. Several Cuban provinces promised to send brigades to help Santiago recover, although officials gave a long list of other towns that suffered devastation. Guantánamo followed a similar fate to Santiago, with television showing telephone poles and cables down across the city. Several historic buildings in the center of town were reportedly damaged. Total losses throughout Santiago de Cuba province reached CUP2.1 billion (US$80 million).

State media has said at least 11 people in Cuba were killed as a result of the storm, and Raúl Castro planned to visit Santiago de Cuba in the coming days. Nine of the deaths were in Santiago de Cuba Province and two were in Guantánamo Province and most of the victims were trapped in destroyed houses. This makes Sandy the deadliest hurricane to hit Cuba since 2005, when Hurricane Dennis killed 16 people.

Damage to the U.S. Guantanamo Bay Naval Base was not as severe, and there were no reports of injuries at the base. The highest sustained winds were below hurricane strength at 87 kilometres per hour (54 mph), with a maximum gust of 106 kilometres per hour (66 mph). The storm damaged roofs and windows in a few older buildings and tore some of the power cables within the facility. Several recreational boats broke off their moorings, but there was no damage to the prison, according to Navy Capt. Robert Durand.

=== Puerto Rico ===
Police said a man was killed on October 26 in Juana Diaz. He was swept away in a river swollen by rain from Sandy's outer bands. In addition, flooding forced at least 100 families in the southwest to seek new shelter.

== See also ==
- Hurricane Paloma - late-season hurricane that struck Cuba
- Hurricane Dennis - Another hurricane that struck Cuba
