= Effects of Hurricane Sandy in New England =

Hurricane Sandy
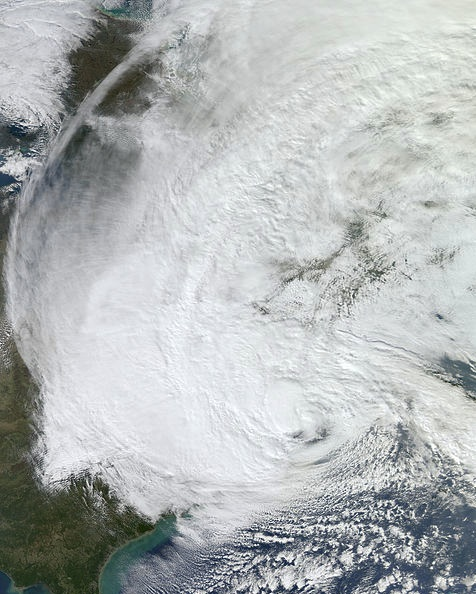
- Satellite image of Hurricane Sandy off the East Coast hours before landfall

Meteorological history
- Formed: October 27, 2012 (Outer fringes of wind field begin to impact New England)
- Dissipated: November 2, 2012 (Dissipated as extratropical cyclone)

Tropical storm
- 1-minute sustained (SSHWS/NWS)
- Highest winds: 70 mph (110 km/h)
- Highest gusts: 85 mph (140 km/h)

Overall effects
- Fatalities: 5 total
- Damage: $394 million (2012 USD)
- Areas affected: New England
- Part of the 2012 Atlantic hurricane season
- History: Meteorological history; Effects: Greater Antilles; United States; Maryland and Washington, D.C.; New Jersey; New York; New England; Canada; Other wikis: Commons: Sandy images

The effects of Hurricane Sandy in New England spread as far north as Maine in late October 2012, with the most significant damage in Connecticut, and included hurricane-force gusts.

== Preparations ==
=== Connecticut ===
Connecticut Governor Dannel Malloy partially activated the state's Emergency Operations Center on October 26 and signed a Declaration of Emergency the next day. On October 28, U.S. President Barack Obama approved Connecticut's request for an emergency declaration, ahead of Hurricane Sandy making landfall; hundreds of National Guard personnel were deployed. On October 29, Governor Malloy ordered road closures for all state highways to be done in two phases. At 11 a.m. EDT, trucks were prohibited from operating on limited access highways. At 1 p.m. EDT, state highways were closed to all non-emergency vehicles; the last time such an order was issued in Connecticut was during the Blizzard of 1978. Tweed New Haven Airport, Sikorsky Memorial Airport, and Groton–New London Airport were shut down due to the storm. Numerous mandatory and partial evacuations were issued in cities across Connecticut.

=== Rhode Island ===
On October 28, Rhode Island Governor Lincoln Chafee and the state's Emergency Management Agency urged that Rhode Islanders be prepared for the storm and "pay attention to the news" as Sandy approached. A Declaration of Emergency was signed later that day. Additionally, National Grid USA, Rhode Island's leading energy company, announced that they were better prepared than during Hurricane Irene in 2011, when lengthy power outages were widespread in the state due to what National Grid has said was a lack of communication amongst National Grid employees. The storm caused almost 100,000 power outages. Some towns, such as Richmond, Rhode Island, lost power after the storm due to it being cut off so other customers could get their power back.

=== Massachusetts ===
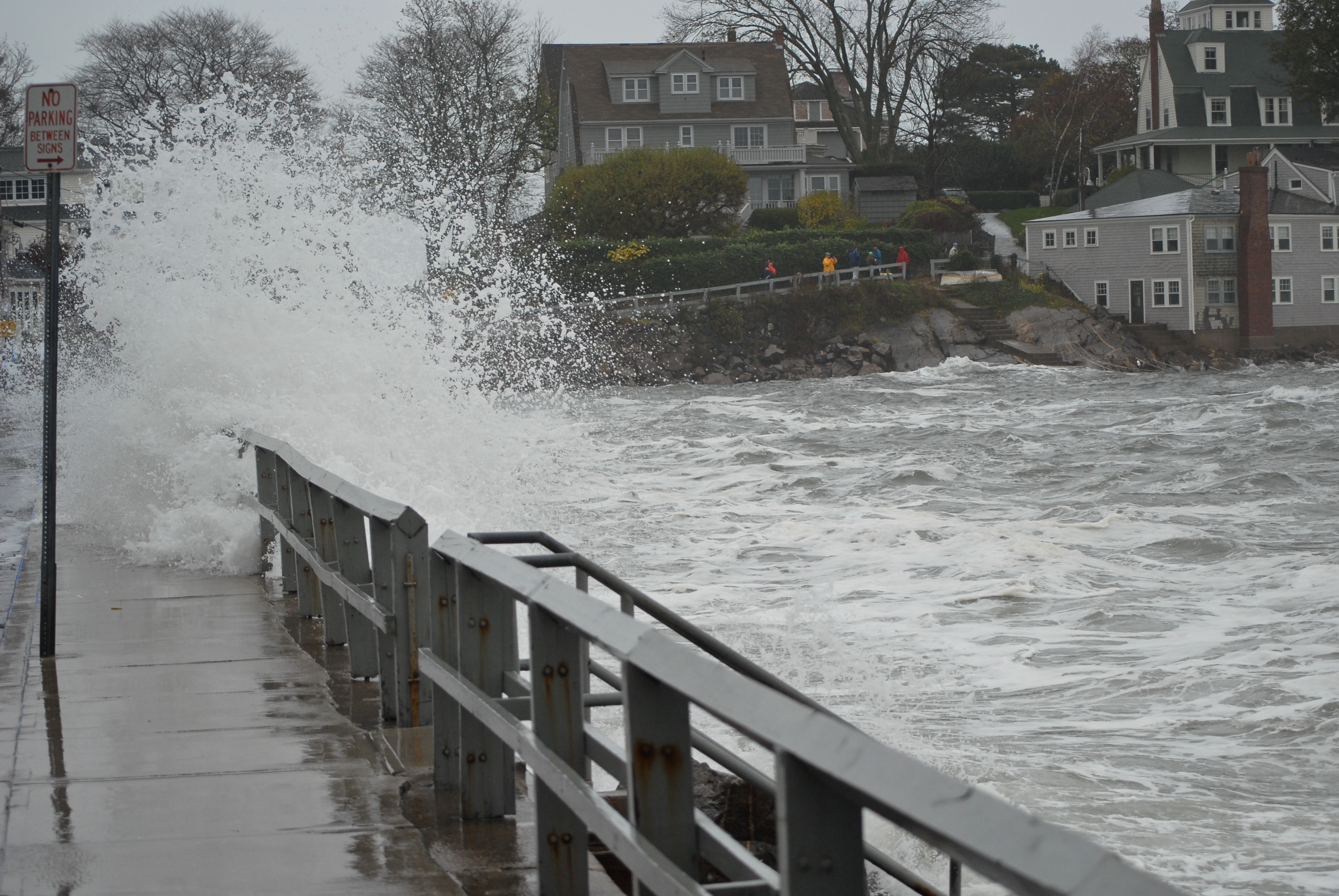
Flooding in Marblehead, Massachusetts, caused by Hurricane Sandy on October 29

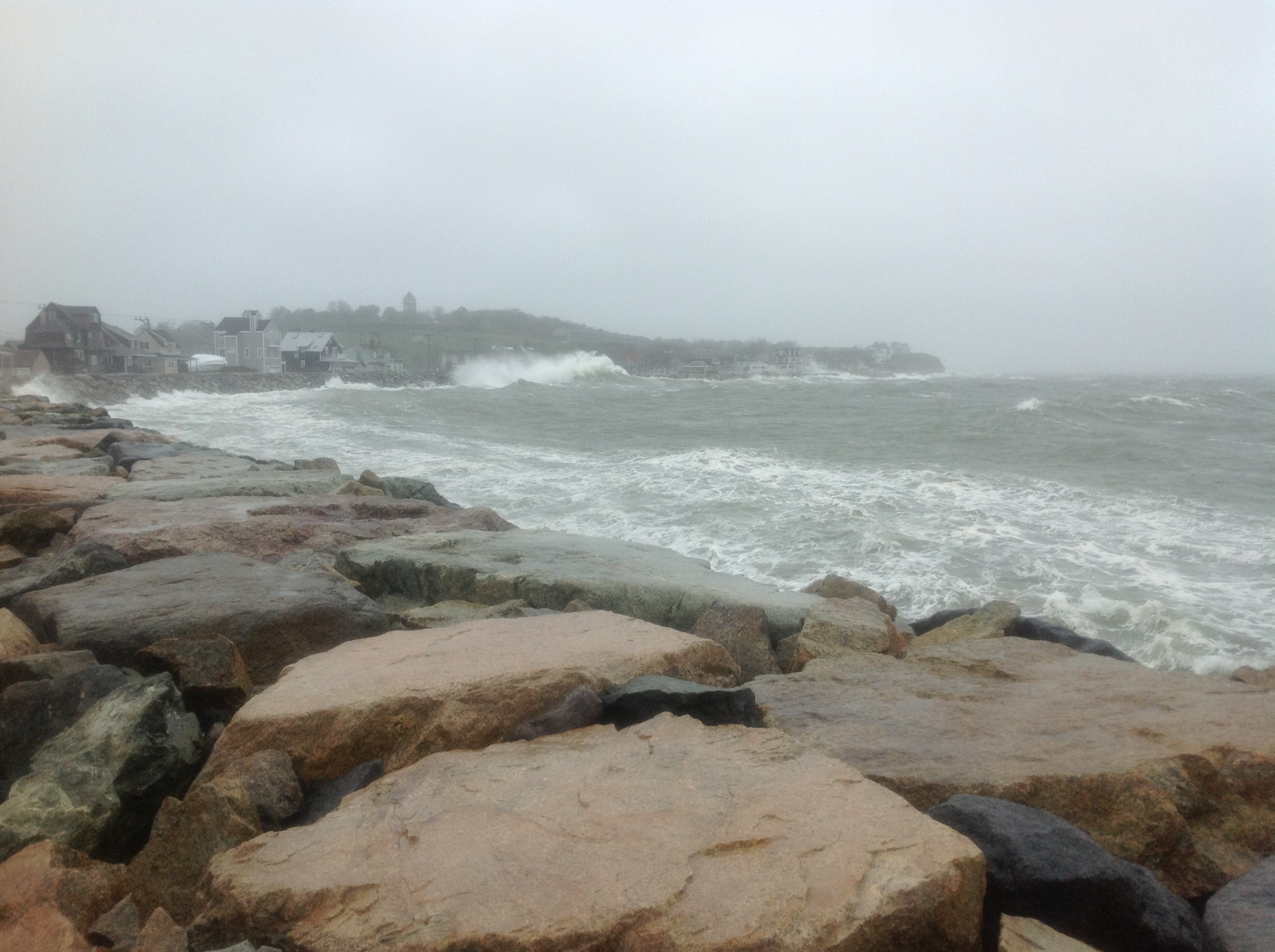
Hull, Massachusetts

On October 24, the Massachusetts Emergency Management Agency began issuing situational awareness news releases as computer models predicted Sandy could "potentially transition over the weekend into a powerful nor'easter." Governor Deval Patrick gave utility companies until October 26 to submit emergency plans in case the storm caused outages. Patrick also encouraged all schools and colleges to close and non-essential employees to remain at home. State officials were considering evacuations of coastal areas. The Massachusetts Bay Transportation Authority expected to operate all public transit services for as long as it was safe to do so. Governor Patrick ordered state offices to be closed October 29 and recommended schools and private businesses close. On October 28, President Obama issued a Pre-Landfall Emergency Declaration for Massachusetts. The American Red Cross opened shelters in Fall River, Weymouth, and Newbury and on Martha's Vineyard, and all schools closed as well. On the morning of October 29, three shelters opened on Cape Cod. The MBTA suspended commuter boat service on the morning of October 29, and suspended all public transportation services at 2 p.m. later in the day.

=== Vermont ===
On October 28, Vermont Governor Peter Shumlin declared a state of emergency to attain federal resources and the National Guard if required. The Southwestern Vermont Supervisory Union announced an early release for school children on October 29. In anticipation of significant damage from Sandy, the town of Chester postponed Halloween until November 7. After numerous public complaints, the statement was retracted.

=== New Hampshire ===
On October 28, New Hampshire Governor John Lynch put 100 National Guard members on active duty to assist with storm preparations and declared a state of emergency. Two shelters were set up and most schools closed.

=== Maine ===
On October 26, Maine's Governor Paul LePage signed a limited emergency declaration that allowed power crews from other states and Canada to help Maine prepare for Hurricane Sandy. The declaration was to help Maine power providers pre-place their crews by extending the hours their crews could drive.

== Impact ==
=== Connecticut ===
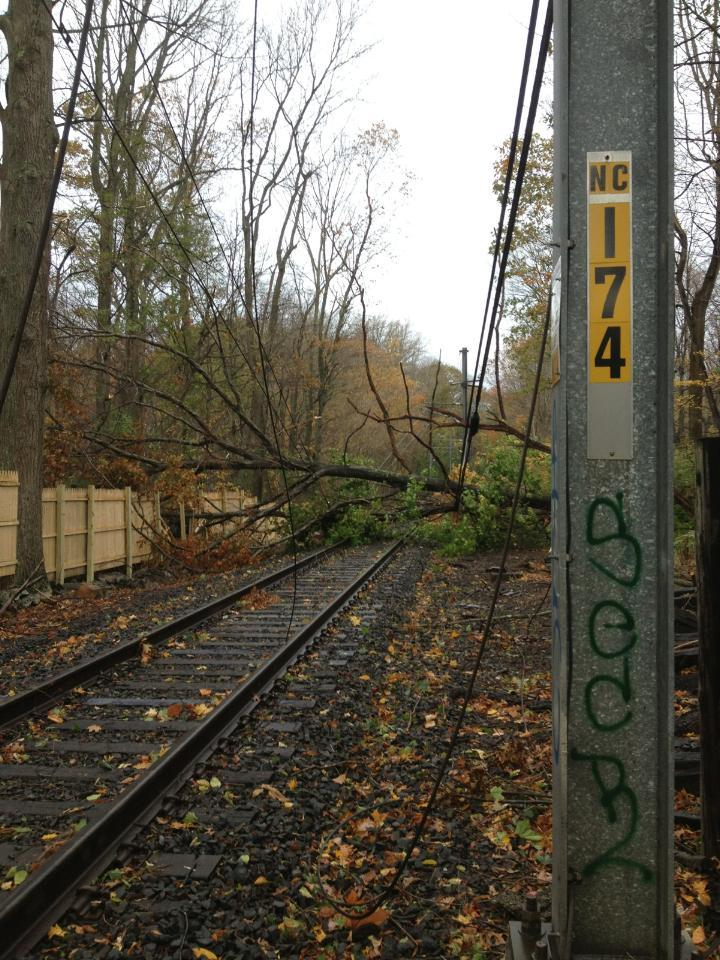
A fallen tree in Fairfield County, Connecticut

On October 28, Governor Dannel P. Malloy signed an executive order extending, by two days, the in-person voter registration deadline to Thursday, November 1, at 8 p.m. for those who intended to vote in the November 6 election. Clean utility water in the state may have been compromised by sewage backups or pollution caused by seawater churned up by Sandy. Norwalk Mayor Richard Moccia said the city's sewage treatment plant was going to be shut down the night of October 29 to minimize damage from the high tide expected later that night. For this reason, Moccia asked residents not to flush their toilets. The storm knocked out power to over 600,000 customers throughout the state.

As of late evening on Wednesday, October 31, there were still 378,000 power outages. It was reported that Madison, Connecticut, had the highest recorded wind speed in Connecticut of 85 miles per hour (137 km/h).

Throughout Connecticut, four people, including a firefighter from Easton, were killed, and damage amounted to at least $360 million.

=== Rhode Island ===
Almost 116,000 National Grid customers lost electrical power in Rhode Island, including over half of customers in Washington and Newport counties, and all but six customers in the town of Charlestown lost power. By October 30, the day after the storm, utility companies were working to restore power. By November 2, 2012, about 7,800 National Grid customers were still without power, down from the earlier reports of 116,000 immediately after the storm.

The Fox Point Hurricane Barrier in Providence was lowered in order to reduce flood damage in the downtown area. Some communities south of the barrier were inundated with flooding. University of Rhode Island cancelled classes for two days, as did Brown University.

Most of the damage in Rhode Island was along the coastline and in southern towns, including deep into Narragansett Bay. The storm surge washed away large sections of the Newport Cliff Walk. The walk was closed through June 2014, when it reopened after a $5.2 million restoration.

Damage across Rhode Island amounted to $11.2 million.

=== Massachusetts ===
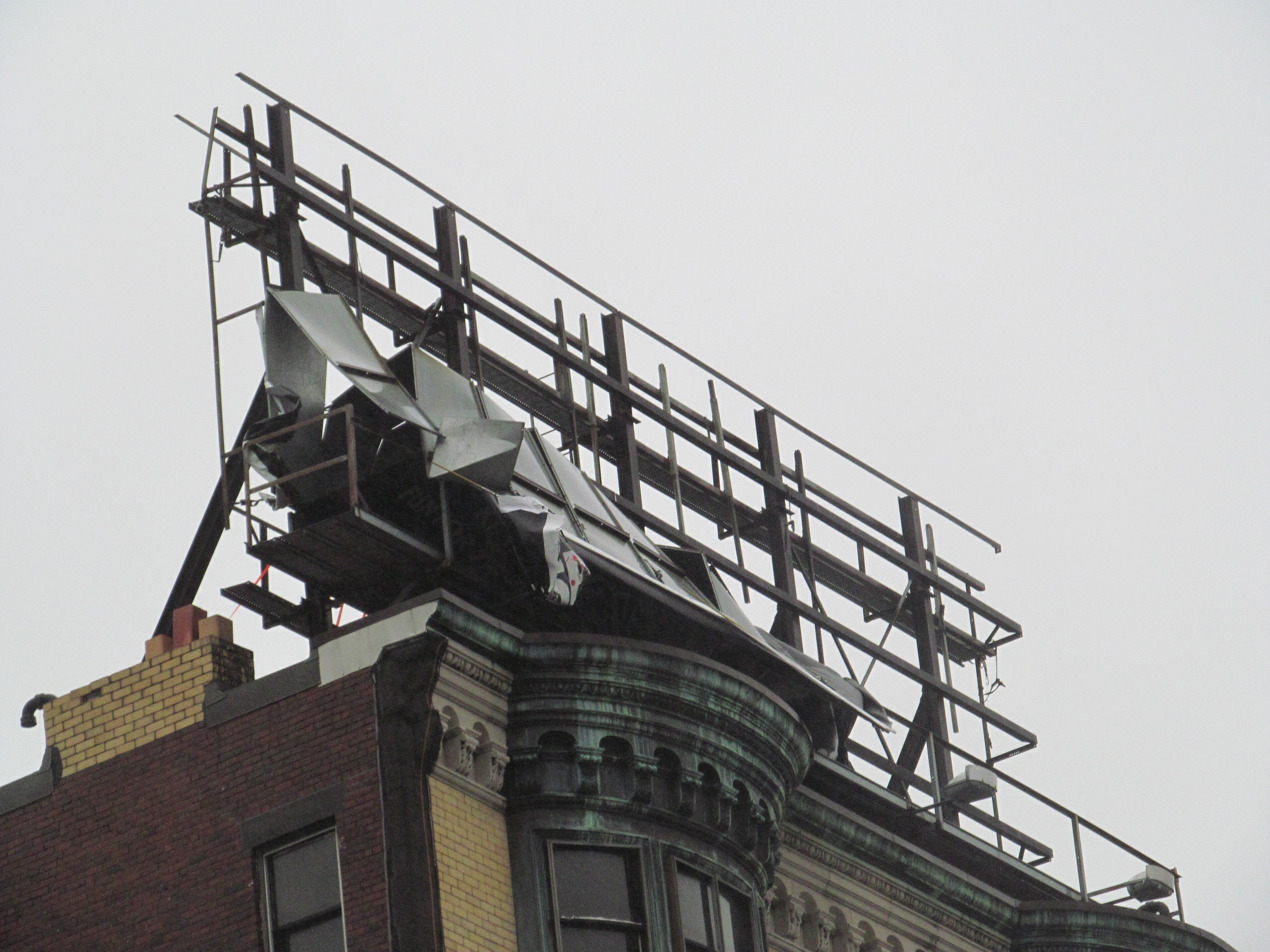
Destroyed billboard in Kenmore Square in Boston

Wind gusts to 83 mph (134 km/h) were recorded on outer Cape Cod and Buzzards Bay. Over 385,000 customers were without power as of the afternoon of October 29, and flooding of roadways and buildings was reported. As of 2 p.m. November 1, about 12,000 customers were still without power in the state. As of the morning of November 2, 7,200 customers were still without power, down from 400,000.

Throughout Massachusetts, damage from the storm amounted to $20.8 million.

=== New Hampshire ===
Similar to the rest of New England, Sandy produced widespread gusty winds across New Hampshire, with most areas reporting winds of 40 to 70 mph (64 to 113 km/h). The highest gust measured in state and the country was 140 mph (230 km/h) on Mount Washington. These winds caused widespread damage to trees and power lines, leaving approximately 200,000 residents without power.

Across New Hampshire, one person was killed and damage amounted to $1.8 million.

=== Vermont ===
Across Vermont, most areas experienced wind gusts in excess of 35 mph (56 km/h), with a peak measurement of 72 mph (116 km/h) on Mount Mansfield. Scattered tree and power line damage took place as a result of the winds, leaving approximately 35,000 residents without power. Downed trees resulted in the temporary closure of Route 9 near Brattleboro. Additionally, trees were reported down on Interstate 91. In addition to gusty winds, the storm produced generally light rains across the state, with valleys reporting less than 1 in (25 mm) and slightly higher amounts in elevated locations. Rainfall in Vermont peaked at 2.07 in (53 mm) in Woodford. Due to dry conditions prior to the storm, no flooding took place. Warm air wrapped around the system led to Burlington recording a record high of 70 °F (21 °C) on October 30. Damage across the state was limited, amounting to $220,000.

=== Maine ===
Damage across Maine amounted to $284,500. Over 150,000 customers lost power in Maine due to the storm, and a 50 ft (15 m) barge sunk.

== Aftermath ==
=== Connecticut ===
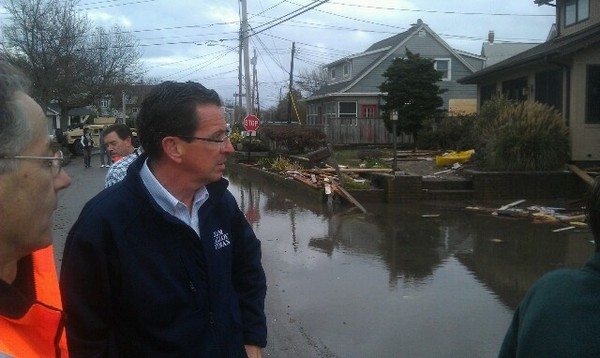
Connecticut governor Dannel Malloy assesses hurricane damage in East Haven, Connecticut

The U.S. Homeland Security Secretary Janet Napolitano said the federal government would offer help to the state, and as of the morning of November 2, 241,000 customers were without power, down from a peak of 625,000. Commuter rail service along the Danbury and Waterbury branches of Metro-North Railroad's New Haven Line resumed November 4. On November 7, the Federal Emergency Management Agency closed some disaster recovery centers as of 1 p.m. EDT due to the nor'easter.

=== Rhode Island ===
On November 2, Governor Chafee signed a request seeking a presidential disaster declaration for three of the state's five counties.

=== Massachusetts ===
The state's federally-owned TS Kennedy was sent to Elizabeth, New Jersey, on November 4. The ship was to serve as a "hotel" for emergency workers, power crews and others helping the area.

=== New Hampshire ===
Crews were brought in from as far away as Texas and Michigan to help restore power in the state. On November 28, President Obama declared the counties of Belknap, Carroll, Coos, Grafton, and Sullivan as federal disaster areas.
