= Meteorological history of Hurricane Sandy =

Hurricane Sandy
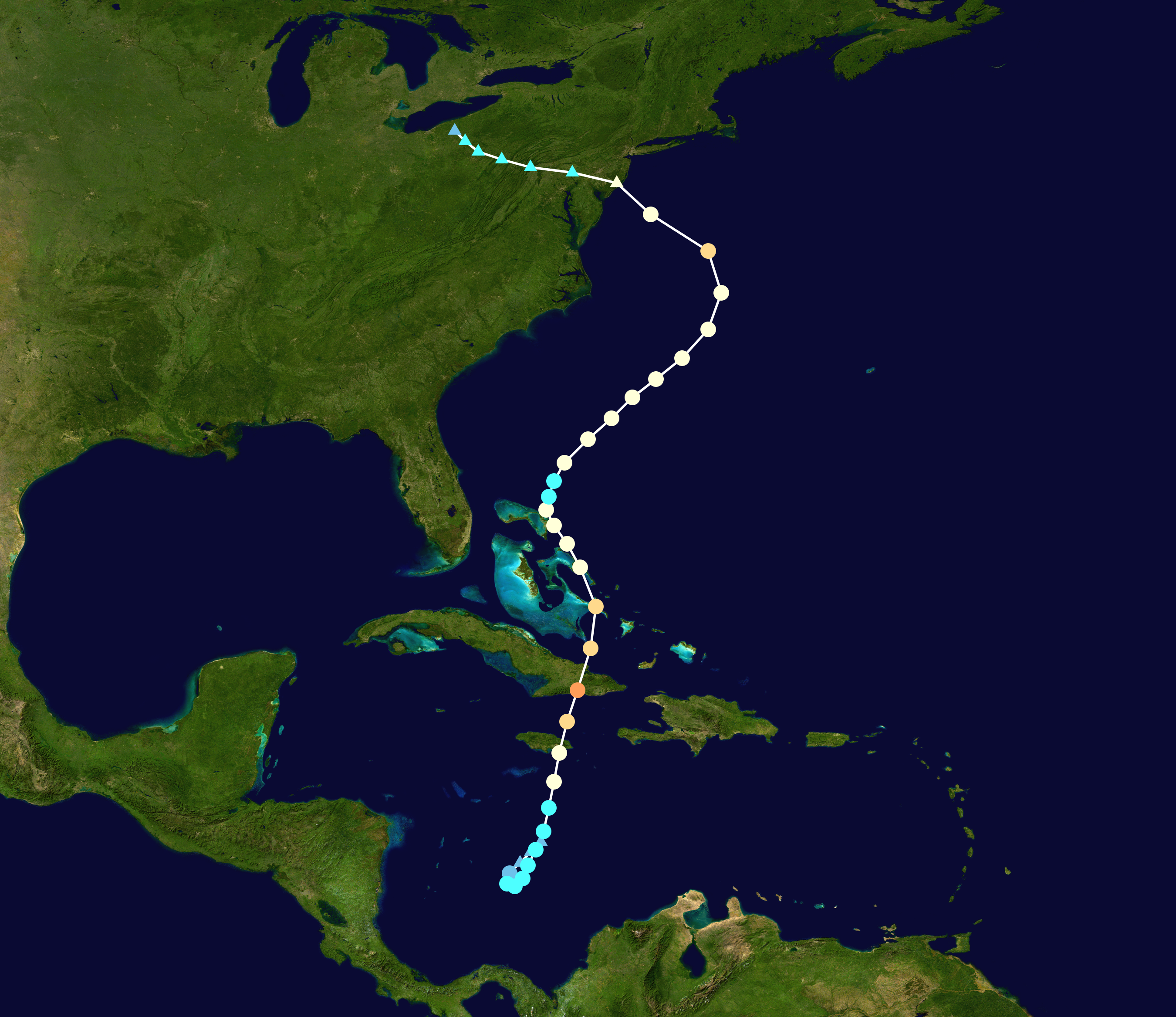
- Track of Hurricane Sandy

Meteorological history
- Formed: October 22, 2012
- Post-tropical: October 29, 2012
- Dissipated: November 2, 2012

Category 3 major hurricane
- 1-minute sustained (SSHWS/NWS)
- Highest winds: 115 mph (185 km/h)
- Lowest pressure: 940 mbar (hPa); 27.76 inHg

Overall effects
- Areas affected: Greater Antilles, The Bahamas, East Coast of the United States, Bermuda, Atlantic Canada
- Part of the 2012 Atlantic hurricane season
- History: Meteorological history; Effects: Greater Antilles; United States; Maryland and Washington, D.C.; New Jersey; New York; New England; Canada; Other wikis: Commons: Sandy images

Hurricane Sandy was the eighth-costliest Atlantic hurricane on record. It lasted for over a week in late October-early November 2012. Classified as the eighteenth named storm, tenth hurricane, and second major hurricane of the annual hurricane season, Sandy originated from a tropical wave on October 22. Performing a small loop over the central Caribbean Sea, the system intensified into a tropical storm a day later and became the final hurricane of the season before briefly coming ashore the coast of Jamaica on October 24. After emerging between Jamaica and Cuba, Sandy began a period of rapid intensification into a Category 3 hurricane on the Saffir–Simpson hurricane wind scale, with maximum sustained winds of 115 mph (185 km/h). It made landfall at this intensity near Santiago de Cuba on October 25.

An approaching trough over the central United States induced high wind shear over Sandy as it traversed the Bahamas, causing the hurricane to weaken to a tropical storm while turning more northeastward. The southern part of the trough detached, causing the shear to decrease late on October 28 and allowing Sandy to regain strength. It attained a secondary peak of Category 2 strength the following day, and later turned toward the west. During this change in direction, Sandy began to transition into an extratropical cyclone, a process it completed before making landfall near Brigantine, New Jersey, late on October 29. The extratropical remnants weakened gradually overland, and the center of circulation was declared indistinguishable over western Pennsylvania two days later. In addition to becoming the largest Atlantic hurricane, Sandy broke records for the lowest pressures ever observed in many cities across the Northeastern United States.

== Origins ==
Sandy as a tropical disturbance on October 20

The origins of Hurricane Sandy trace back to a tropical wave that moved off the western coast of Africa and into the eastern Atlantic Ocean on October 11. As the wave tracked westward over subsequent days, it interacted with an upper-level trough over the Eastern Atlantic, resulting in the development of widespread shower and thunderstorm activity; however, strong wind shear prevented further development at the time. Increased convergence, likely as a result of Hurricane Rafael to the wave's west, hindered development as well. By October 18, numerous yet disorganized convective activity formed near the center of the disturbance despite moderate wind shear. Marked with an extended low pressure area, conditions were expected to gradually become more favorable for development. On October 20, following modest organization, the National Hurricane Center (NHC) assessed a high potential for it to become a tropical cyclone within 48 hours, tagging it "Invest 99L".

By the next day, the convection had decreased, although barometric pressures in the area remained low, a trademark of development. Convection gradually increased as the day went on, while the system slowed and became nearly stationary over the western Caribbean. By 1500 UTC on October 22, surface observations and satellite imagery indicated the system had developed enough organized convection to be classified as Tropical Depression Eighteen. At the time of the upgrade, the system was situated about 320 mi (510 km) south of Kingston, Jamaica The environment around the newly formed depression was characterized by an area of weak steering currents south of a ridge extending eastward from the Gulf of Mexico. Low wind shear and warm sea surface temperatures were conducive for strengthening, and perhaps rapid deepening. Late on October 22, a Hurricane Hunters flight observed winds of 40 mph (64 km/h) in a rainband well removed from the center of circulation, prompting the NHC to upgrade the depression to Tropical Storm Sandy. Outflow increased, while moist air helped the convection organize further. The NHC noted that "remaining nearly stationary over the warm waters of southwestern Caribbean Sea is never a good sign for this time of year." Still, the cloud pattern initially remained largely unchanged. Early on October 24, an eye began developing, as observed on microwave imagery, and Sandy was moving steadily northward, drawn by a trough approaching from the northwest. At 1500 UTC on October 24, the NHC upgraded Sandy to hurricane status after the Hurricane Hunters observed flight-level winds of 99 mph (159 km/h). At the time, Sandy was located roughly 65 mi (105 km) south of Kingston, Jamaica.

== Caribbean landfalls and The Bahamas ==
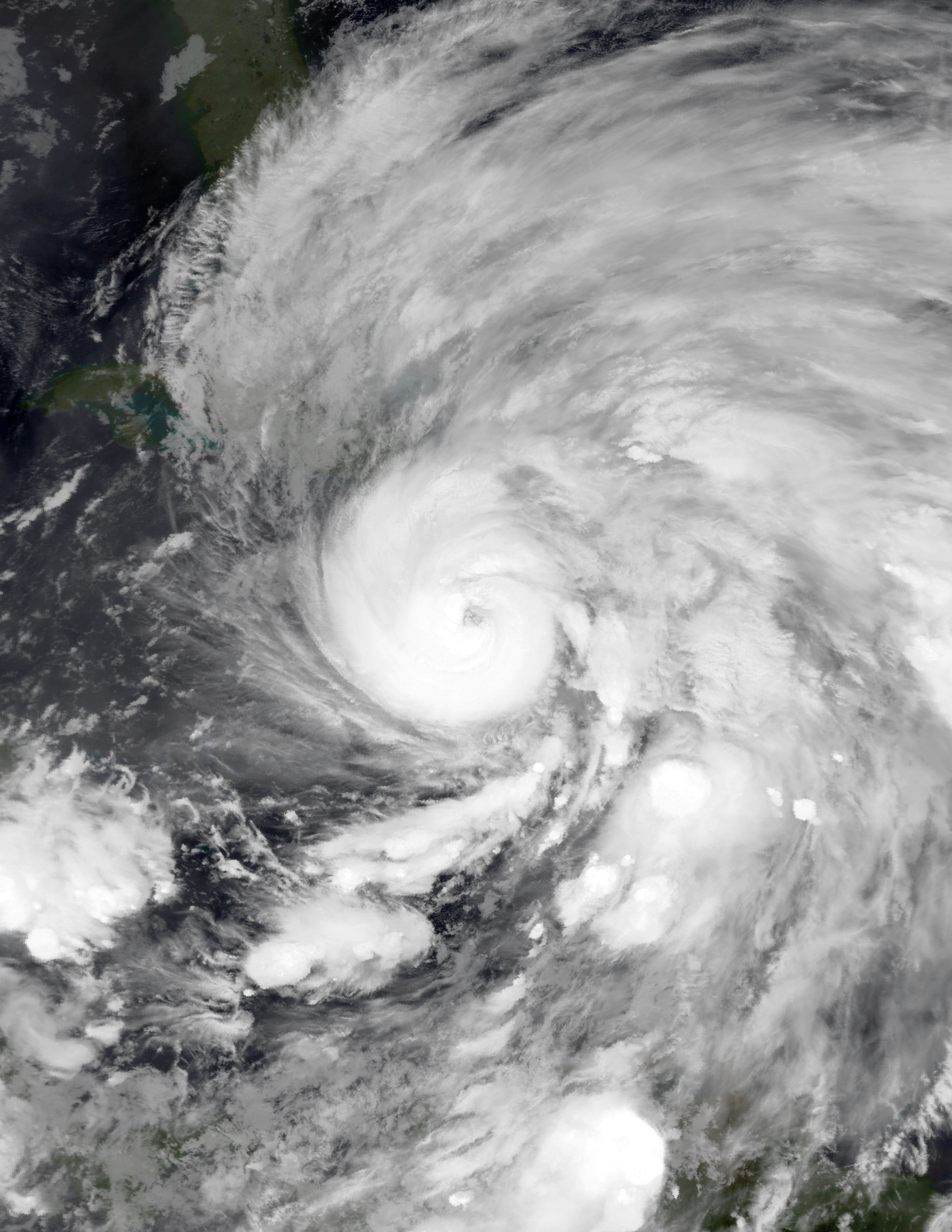
Sandy near peak intensity just before making landfall in Cuba on October 25

At approximately 1900 UTC on October 24, Sandy made landfall near Kingston, with winds near 85 mph (137 km/h). After spending a short duration over the island, Sandy moved just offshore Cuba and began a period of rapid intensification, in which the cyclone strengthened into a Category 3 hurricane on the Saffir-Simpson hurricane wind scale, with 1-minute sustained winds at 115 mph (185 km/h) winds and a central pressure at 954 millibars (28.2 inHg); operationally, Sandy was classified as a high-end Category 2 hurricane at landfall. Shortly thereafter, at 0525 UTC on October 25, the hurricane came ashore just west of Santiago de Cuba. At landfall, Sandy had a well-defined eye over 23 mi (37 km) in diameter, and flight-level winds reached 135 mph (217 km/h). While over land, the structure deteriorated, and the eye was no longer visible. After exiting Cuba, a combination of dry air and increasing shear restricted the outflow of Sandy and caused the structure of the storm to become disorganized. A mid-level low over Florida and approaching trough turned the hurricane toward the north-northwest.

By early October 26, a majority of the convection in association with Sandy was located to the north of the center, primarily due to wind shear and dry air to the southwest of the hurricane. The size of the storm had increased greatly as well, with tropical storm-force winds extending out some 275 mi (443 km) from the center. As the day progressed, Sandy continued moving slowly to the north, and the strong wind shear caused the storm's intensity to decrease slightly. On October 27, the NHC remarked that Sandy was "showing characteristics of a hybrid cyclone...like a large occluded frontal low." However, the system maintained a warm thermal core, and despite strong 50 kt (60 mph) wind shear, continued to develop thunderstorms due to an abundance of divergence from a nearby trough; the same trough turned Sandy toward the northeast as the two began to phase and morph into what many called a "Superstorm". On October 27, Sandy briefly weakened to a tropical storm, after dry air became fully ingested into the mid- and upper-level circulations. Later that day, however, data received from the Hurricane Hunters indicated that Sandy had re-intensified into a minimal hurricane.

== Post-tropical transition and final landfall ==
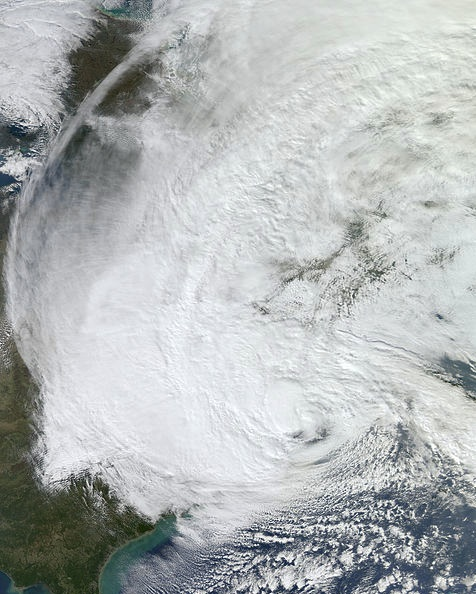
Hurricane Sandy off the east coast a few hours before landfall on October 29

By late October 27, Sandy was moving steadily northeastward ahead of an approaching trough. Although it maintained winds of hurricane force, the entrainment of dry air and continued strong wind shear caused the inner area of convection to diminish. On October 28, however, thunderstorms increased over the center, and Sandy's upper-level circulation was better defined when opposed to 24 hours previous. As the day progressed, wind shear decreased, and a banded eye began redeveloping while the hurricane was still over the Gulf Stream. The convection organized further early on October 29. Around the same time, Sandy began transitioning into an extratropical storm after the western periphery of the circulation began interacting with a cold front. The storm revolved around an upper-level low over the eastern United States, and also to the southwest of a ridge over Atlantic Canada that the NHC described as "highly anomalous"; this caused Sandy to turn to the north and northwest. Maintaining an eye and deep convection, the hurricane intensified, reaching a secondary peak of 100 mph (160 km/h) and an unusually low central barometric pressure of 940 millibars (28 inHg), by 1200 UTC on October 29; at this time, the cyclone was moving over a small area of the Gulf Stream with waters in excess of 81 °F (27 °C). Around that time, Sandy had a gale-force wind field of over 1,150 mi (1,850 km) in diameter. Both a warm and cold front were located near the storm's center, and the storm was predicted to become extratropical before landfall.

The convection diminished while the hurricane accelerated toward the New Jersey coast, due to it becoming involved with the low to the west. The pressure continued to drop, which indicated the system was intensifying because of baroclinic instability. In an advisory issued by the NHC late on October 29, the NHC noted that, "all of these considerations lead us to conclude that the most appropriate classification at advisory time is extratropical." The agency declared Sandy a post-tropical cyclone at about 2100 UTC that afternoon, while located just offshore southern New Jersey. About 2½ hours later, the storm made landfall approximately 5 mi (8.0 km) northeast of Atlantic City near Brigantine. The intensity at landfall was estimated at 80 mph (130 km/h), although the strongest winds were located offshore, east and southeast of the center.

== Dissipation ==
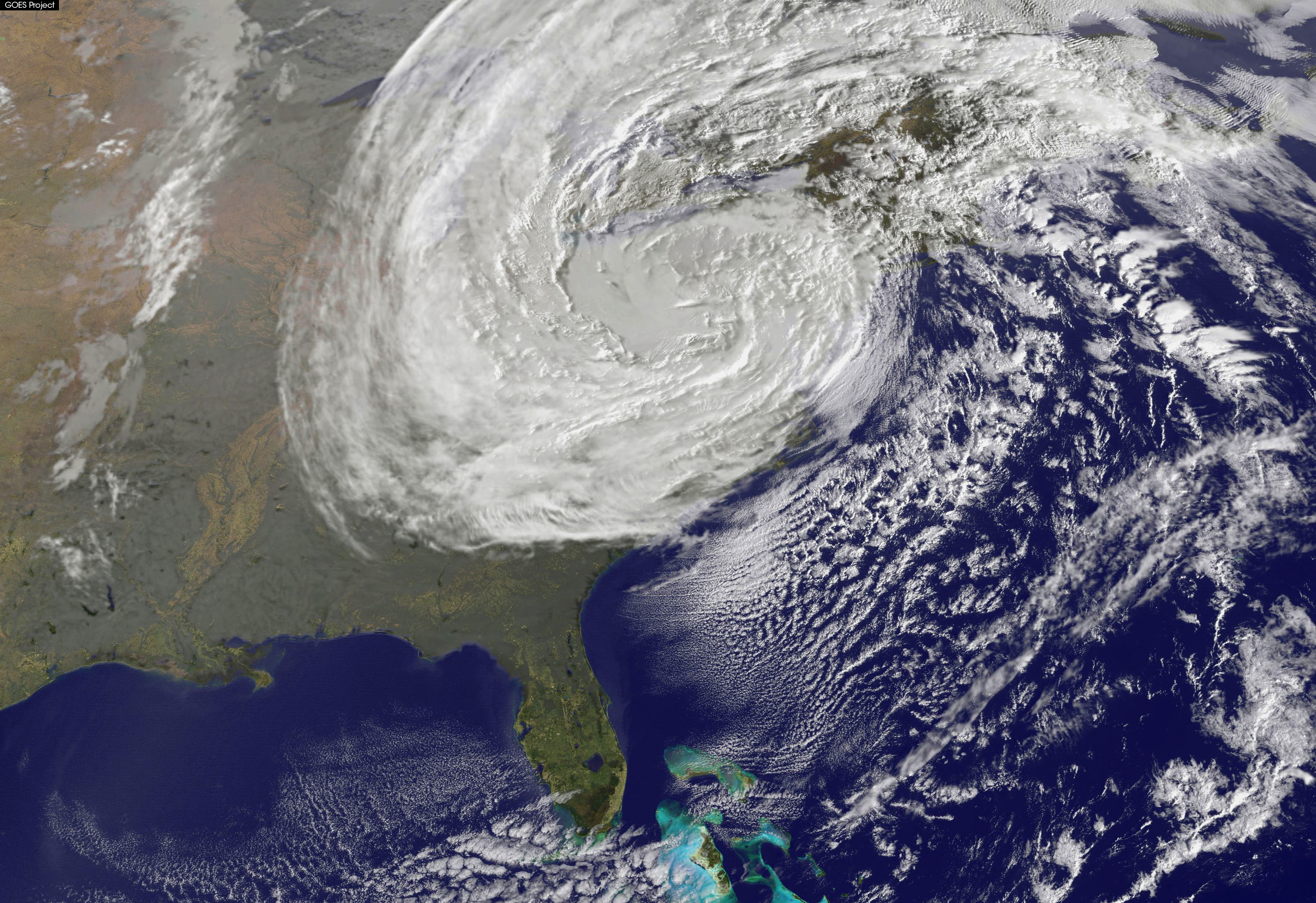
Post-Tropical Cyclone Sandy in the early hours of October 30, after landfall

After moving ashore, Sandy continued moving to the west, weakening below hurricane force by the time it reached Pennsylvania. Because the system was non-tropical, the Weather Prediction Center (WPC) – known at the time as the Hydrometeorogical Prediction Center (HPC) – took over the responsibility of issuing advisories on the low. The remnants of Sandy brought heavy snow and high winds to the central Appalachian Mountains, resulting in blizzard warnings being issued. The system continued to weaken as it moved across western Pennsylvania, and by 0300 UTC on October 31, the storm's movement had shifted to the northwest. Blizzard conditions continued in the Appalachians, bringing more snow to the region that had already seen high amounts the day before. By 0900 UTC on October 31, the circulation degenerated into a trough of low pressure, with no discernible center of low pressure. Later that day, the remnants of Sandy spread into the Great Lakes, and the WPC issued its last advisory. By the time the system had moved out of the region, nearly three feet of snow had fallen in some areas of West Virginia, Tennessee, and Maryland, with lesser amounts elsewhere in the region. During the next two days, Sandy's remnants drifted northward and then northeastward over Ontario, before merging with another low pressure area over Eastern Canada, on November 2.

== Predictions ==
As early as October 23, while Sandy was developing in the Caribbean, the European Centre for Medium-Range Weather Forecasts (ECMWF) predicted the storm would strike the East Coast of the United States, while most other tropical cyclone forecast models anticipated the storm would move out to sea. By the next day, various computer models agreed that Sandy would interact with a trough over the eastern United States and turn to the west. About five days before landfall, the ECMWF, Geophysical Fluid Dynamics Laboratory (GFDL), and Navy Operational Global Prediction System (NOGAPS) models predicted Sandy would strike the Delmarva Peninsula, while the American Global Forecast System (GFS) model anticipated the hurricane would move out to sea; the remaining models were between the two scenarios. By four days before landfall, the NHC was forecasting a landfall on New Jersey, as were most of the computer models. In general, the European computer models performed better than the United States ones, due to the European models' higher resolution. MIT professor Kerry Emanuel used the moment to call attention to the under-performance of US models, and to recommend a "dedicated effort" to reverse it.

== Records ==
Largest Atlantic hurricanes By diameter of gale-force winds
Rank	System	Season	Diameter	
Rank	System	Season	mi	km
1	Sandy	2012	1,150	1,850
2	Martin	2022	1,040	1,670
3	Igor	2010	920	1,480
4	Olga	2001	865	1,390
5	Teddy	2020	850	1,370

The storm surge produced by Hurricane Sandy, which occurred at high tide, pushed water to 13.88 ft (4.23 m) at Battery Park, New York, beating the previous record of 10.02 ft (3.05 m) set by Hurricane Donna in 1960 at the same location. However, a storm surge of 13 feet, during low tide, was also reported at Battery Park during the 1821 Norfolk and Long Island hurricane, which occurred before records were officially kept. Storm tide records were also broken in Sandy Hook, New Jersey and Philadelphia, Pennsylvania, with peak tides of 13.31 and 10.62 ft (4.06 and 3.24 m), respectively. The tidal gauge in Sandy Hook lost power while the tide was still rising, meaning the tide crested higher than the recorded peak. A buoy in New York Harbor reached a record height when it measured a 32.5-foot (9.9 m) wave on October 30, 7.5 feet (2.3 m) taller than a 25-foot (7.6 m) wave registered by Hurricane Irene in 2011.

Sandy was the largest Atlantic tropical cyclone in terms of gale diameter since records began in 1988, with a gale-force diameter measuring 1,150 miles (1,850 kilometers) across. In addition, at 945 millibars (27.9 inHg), Sandy was second only to 1938 New England hurricane for the most intense storm to make landfall in the United States north of Cape Hatteras, North Carolina. The barometric pressure hit a record low of 945.5 mbar (27.92 inHg) over Atlantic City, New Jersey, breaking the previous record of 961 mbar (28.4 inHg) set in 1938. Sandy also broke the record for producing the lowest pressure in Philadelphia, with a minimum of 954 mbar (28.2 inHg); the previous record was 962 mbar (28.4 inHg), set during the 1993 Storm of the Century.

== Effect of climate change ==
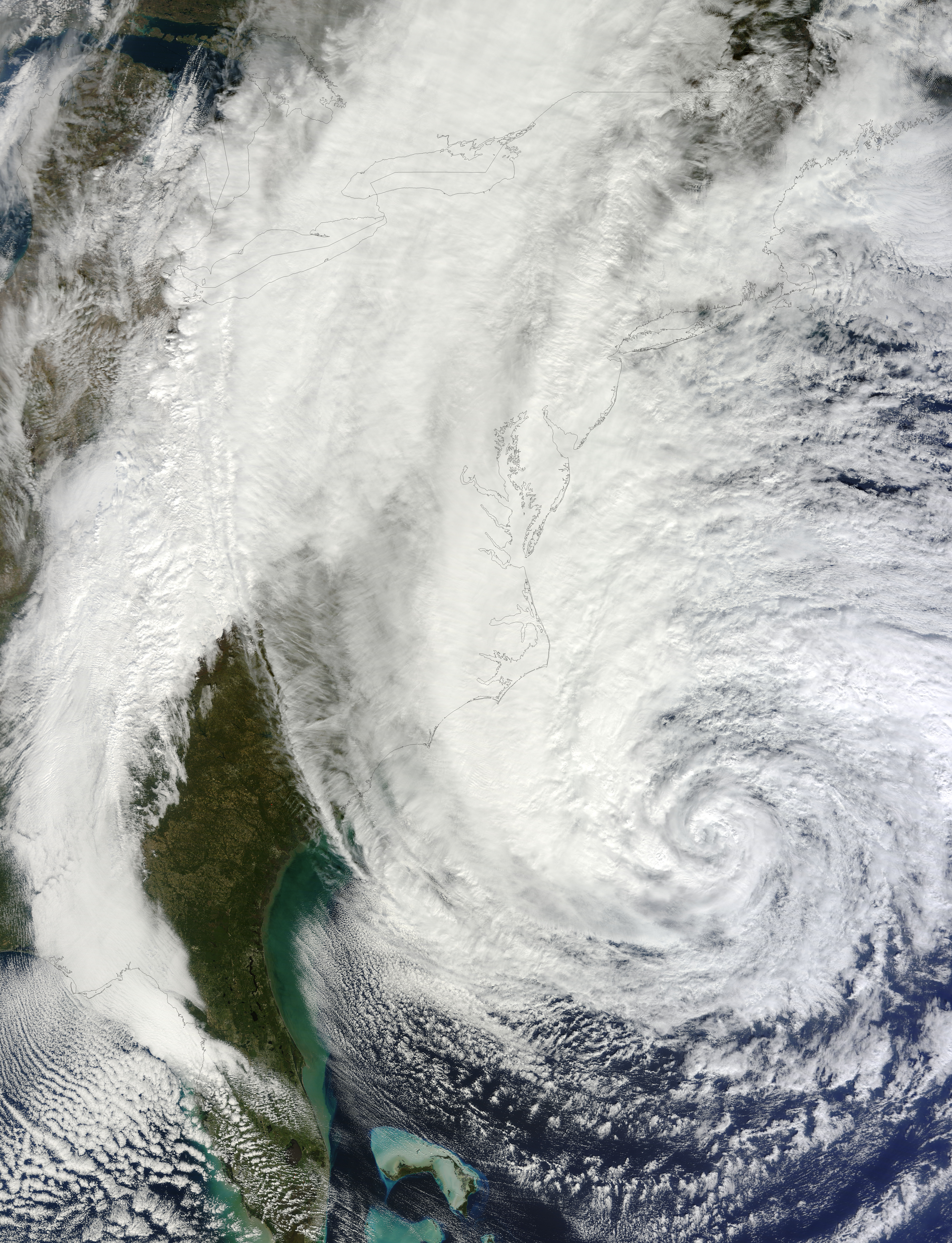
Evening photo of Sandy on October 28

Climate scientists agree that climate change increases the likelihood of stronger and wetter storms, though possibly leading to fewer of them. However, researchers were unable to say just how responsible climate change was for the development and track of Sandy. Tropical cyclones derive their energy from warm waters, and warmer water generally means stronger storms. Climate change has caused sea levels to rise, which made the storm surge and coastal flooding caused by Sandy much more devastating. Since the overall sea level has risen by 8 in (20 cm) between 1902 and 2007, and is accelerating, the rise in sea level increases the risk for major floods to occur every time a storm hits. A 2012 paper in Nature projected that climate change could lead to floods that should occur only once a century to happening every three to twenty years.

In the case of Hurricane Sandy, two major factors contributing to the size and strength of the storm were unusually warm ocean surface temperatures and an increase in blocking patterns, both of which are expected to occur more frequently due to global warming. As they drift north, Atlantic hurricanes are typically moved to the east and out to sea by the jet stream's prevailing winds. This typical pattern was blocked by a ridge of high pressure over Greenland, resulting in a negative Arctic oscillation, forming a kink in the jet stream and causing it to double back on itself off the East Coast; Sandy was caught up in this northwesterly flow. The blocking pattern over Greenland also stalled an arctic front, which combined with the cyclone. Mark Fischetti of Scientific American argued that the jet stream's unusual shape was caused by the melting of Arctic ice. Noting that these blocking patterns are unusual in the fall but have been increasing, meteorologist Jeff Masters said that three studies in 2011 found "that the recent record decline in Arctic sea ice could be responsible, since this heats up the pole, altering the Equator-to-pole temperature difference, forcing the jet stream to slow down, meander, and get stuck in large loops." Trenberth said that while a negative Arctic Oscillation and a blocking anticyclone were in place, the null hypothesis remained that this was just the natural variability of weather.

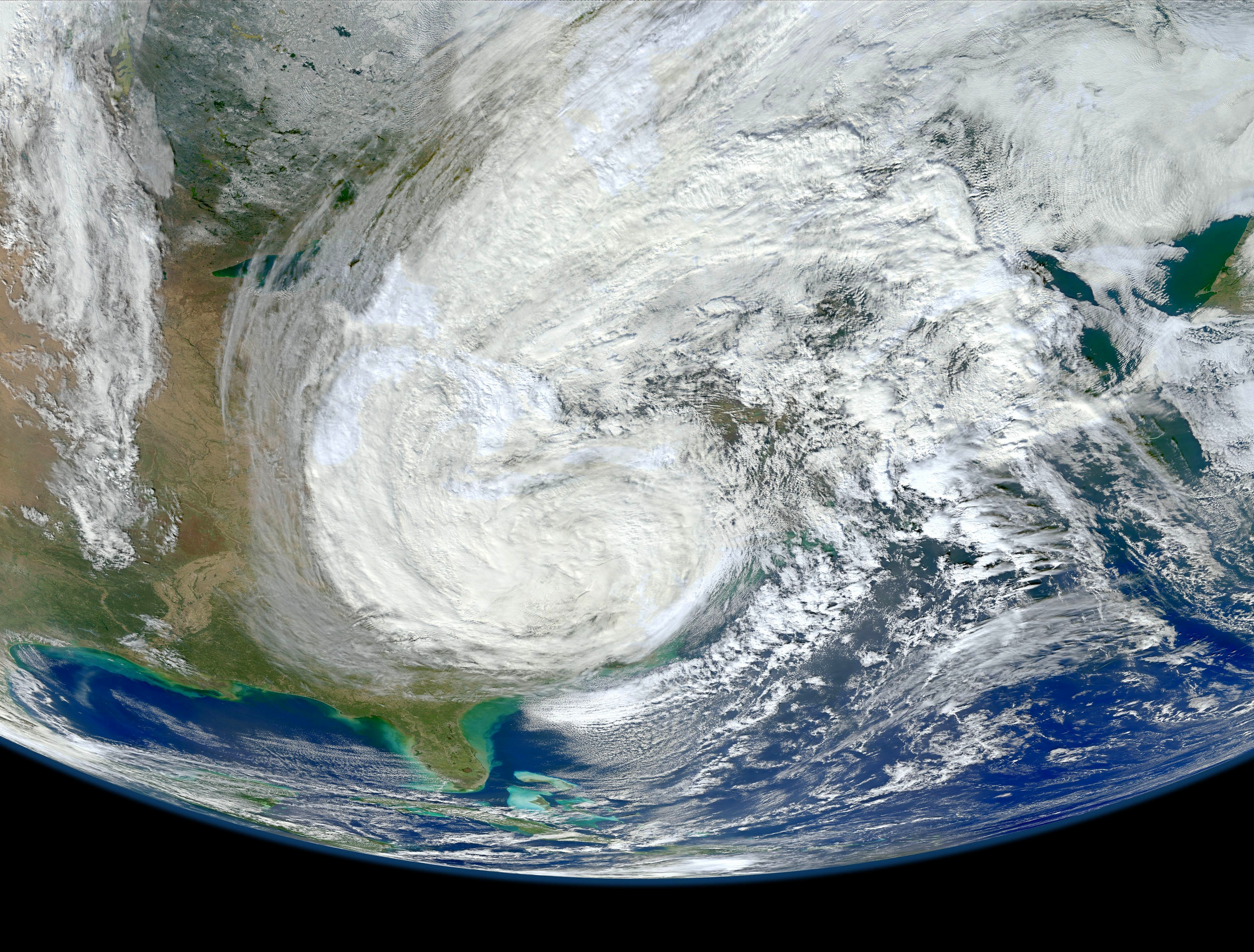
Sandy, as seen by the Suomi NPP satellite on October 30, over the eastern United States and Canada

Climatologist Michael E. Mann attributes at least one foot of the 13-foot (at least 0.3 of the 4-meter) storm surge in Lower Manhattan to global sea level rise. Harvard geologist Daniel P. Schrag calls Hurricane Sandy's 13-foot storm surge an example of what will, by mid-century, be the "new norm on the Eastern seaboard".

According to National Center for Atmospheric Research (NCAR) senior climatologist Kevin E. Trenberth, "The answer to the oft-asked question of whether an event is caused by climate change is that it is the wrong question. All weather events are affected by climate change because the environment in which they occur is warmer and moister than it used to be." He illustrates by pointing out that steroids in a baseball player's system do not cause home runs all by themselves but do make home runs more likely. Meteorologist Kerry Emanuel stressed that no individual weather event, such as Hurricane Sandy, can be attributed to climate change, or any specific cause, for that matter.

NOAA meteorologist Martin Hoerling attributed the "immediate cause" of Sandy to "little more than the coincidental alignment of a tropical storm with an extratropical storm." Trenberth agrees that the storm was caused by "natural variability", but adds that it was "enhanced by global warming". One factor contributing to the storm's strength was additional energy from abnormally warm water off the North American East Coast, where global warming was identified as contributing 1.1 °F (0.6 °C) of the 5.4 °F (3 °C) above-average sea surface temperatures. As the temperature of the atmosphere increases, the capacity to hold water increases, leading to stronger storms and higher rainfall amounts.

US Representative Henry Waxman, the top Democrat on the House Energy and Commerce Committee, wanted Republicans to hold a hearing on links between climate change and Hurricane Sandy. "Hurricane Sandy is exactly the type of extreme weather event that climate scientists have said will become more frequent and more severe if we fail to reduce our carbon pollution. That is why we are writing to request that you hold a hearing on the storm and its relation to climate change in the lame-duck session", he and Congressmen Bobby Rush wrote. The hearing was not presented before the senate and house prior to the emergence of the new Congress in early 2013. On April 9, 2013, however, Waxman and Rush renewed their request of a hearing, stating that, "If we rely upon representatives of electric utilities, coal companies, oil refiners, and chemical manufacturers to explain the state of the science regarding climate change, we are unlikely to get a full and unbiased view of the challenge we must confront and the opportunities we have."

== See also ==
- List of New Jersey hurricanes
