= Effects of Hurricane Sandy in New Jersey =

Hurricane Sandy
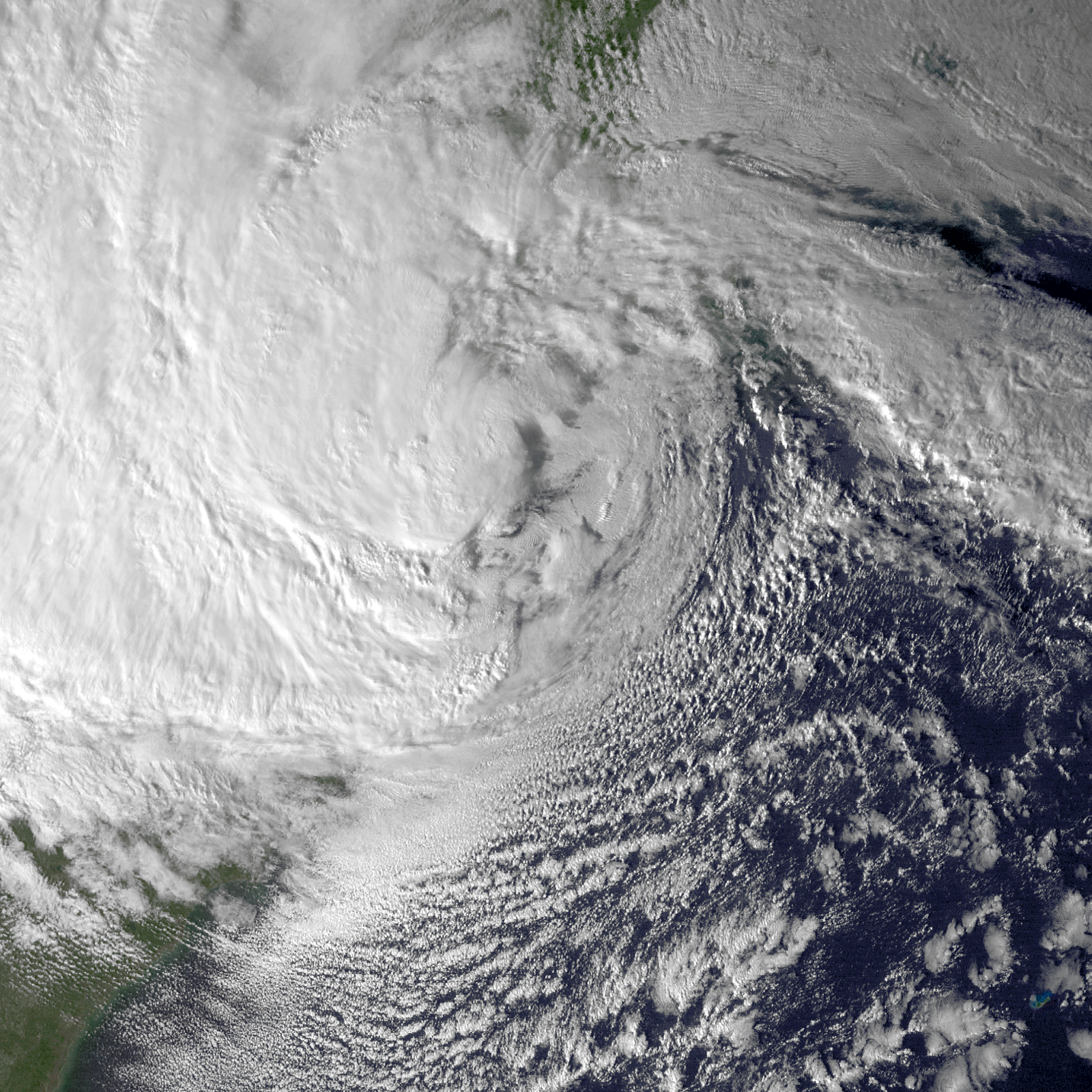
- Satellite image of Sandy shortly before landfall in New Jersey on October 29

Meteorological history
- Duration: October 28–29, 2012

Category 1 hurricane
- 1-minute sustained (SSHWS/NWS)
- Highest winds: 80 mph (130 km/h)
- Highest gusts: 100 mph (155 km/h)
- Lowest pressure: 945 mbar (hPa); 27.91 inHg

Overall effects
- Fatalities: 38 total (12 direct)
- Economic losses: $30 billion (2012 USD)
- Areas affected: New Jersey, particularly along the Jersey Shore in Ocean County and Monmouth County
- Part of the 2012 Atlantic hurricane season
- History: Meteorological history; Effects: Greater Antilles; United States; Maryland and Washington, D.C.; New Jersey; New York; New England; Canada; Other wikis: Commons: Sandy images

Hurricane Sandy was the costliest natural disaster in the history of New Jersey, with economic losses to businesses of up to $30 billion. The most intense storm of the 2012 Atlantic hurricane season, Sandy formed in the Caribbean Sea on October 22. For days ahead of its eventual landfall, the hurricane was expected to turn toward New Jersey, as anticipated by tropical cyclone forecast models and the National Hurricane Center (NHC). On October 29, Sandy lost its characteristics of a tropical cyclone and transitioned into an extratropical cyclone while approaching the New Jersey coast. About two and a half hours later, the former hurricane moved ashore New Jersey near Brigantine in Atlantic County, just north of Atlantic City, producing wind gusts as strong as 91 mph (146 km/h).

Over two million households in the state lost power in the storm, 346,000 homes were damaged or destroyed, and 38 people were killed. Storm surge and flooding affected a large swath of the state. Governor Chris Christie said the losses caused by Sandy were "going to be almost incalculable...The devastation on the Jersey Shore is probably going to be the worst we've ever seen."

== Preparations ==
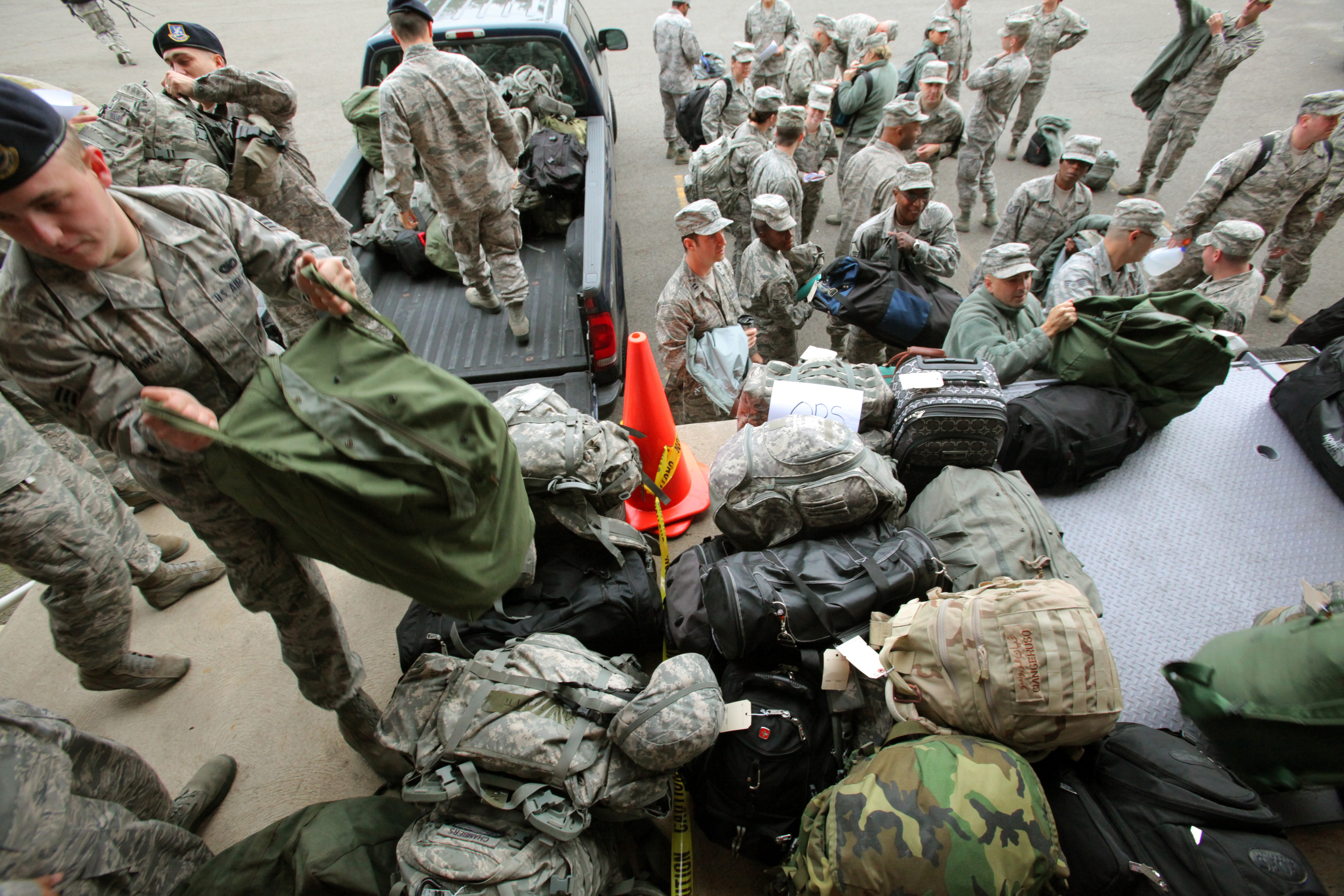
Airmen of the New Jersey Air National Guard 108th Wing prepare to go to assist at emergency shelters.

Hurricane Sandy originated from a tropical depression in the Caribbean Sea on October 22. By a day later, the computer model of the European Centre for Medium-Range Weather Forecasts anticipated that the hurricane would eventually strike New Jersey. Early on October 25, Hurricane Sandy moved across eastern Cuba as a major hurricane and emerged into the western Atlantic Ocean. Later that day, the National Hurricane Center (NHC) first forecast a landfall in New Jersey, due to the anticipated interaction between Sandy and an approaching trough, as well as the presence of a ridge over New England. The forecast reflected the majority of computer models, which had previously suggested a northeast track across the Atlantic Ocean.

The NHC expected that Sandy would become extratropical at some point before hitting the coast, but there was uncertainty in the timing. To avoid potential confusion, the agency did not issue hurricane and tropical cyclone warnings; instead, the National Weather Service (NWS) offices in Mount Holly and New York City issued high wind warnings for the state, reflecting the expectation of wind gusts over 58 mph (93 km/h). The NWS issued a flood watch and a coastal flood watch on October 27 for much of the state. These were upgraded to warnings as Sandy approached the state. The NHC anticipated a storm surge of 4 to 8 ft (1.2 to 2.4 m).

On October 26, or three days before landfall, then-Governor Chris Christie issued a voluntary evacuation order for all barrier islands along the Jersey Shore, which were upgraded to a mandatory evacuation a day later. About 115,000 people were under evacuation orders, of whom about 15,000 people used emergency shelters. A woman in Atlantic City died of a heart attack while evacuating on a bus. On October 27, Christie declared a state of emergency, activating 2,000 National Guard troops.

The passage of Sandy prompted the closure of all state parks and historic sites, state offices, courts, and all 580 school districts. All Atlantic City casinos closed on the day before landfall and remained closed for six days until November 3. This led to a 28% drop in revenue during November. It was the biggest monthly drop in 34 years.

Tolls were suspended on the northbound Garden State Parkway and the westbound Atlantic City Expressway starting at 6:00 a.m. on October 28. In Cape May County, New Jersey, officials advised residents on barrier islands to evacuate on October 26, becoming a mandatory evacuation on October 28. There was also a voluntary evacuation for Mantoloking, Bay Head, Barnegat Light, Beach Haven, Harvey Cedars, Long Beach, Ship Bottom, and Stafford in Ocean County. On October 28, Hoboken mayor Dawn Zimmer ordered an evacuation of all basement and street level residential units, due to possible flooding. Similarly, Jersey City mayor Jerramiah Healy ordered an evacuation of all basement and 1st-floor units east of Greene Street, south of Columbus Drive, and east of Washington Boulevard north of Columbus Drive. On October 29, a mandatory evacuation was put in effect for residents in some parts of Logan Township. On November 1, Governor Christie lifted mandatory evacuation orders in Atlantic and Cape May counties.

Ahead of the storm, officials warned residents of the potential for power outages lasting over a week. Jersey Central Power & Light told employees to be prepared for extended shifts. Most schools, colleges, and universities were closed October 29 and at least 509 out of 580 school districts were closed October 30. In the early morning hours of October 29, PATH and New Jersey Transit services were suspended in preparation for the hurricane. Also, the Garden State Parkway was completely shut down south of the Atlantic City Expressway due to flooding.

President Obama signed an emergency declaration for New Jersey. The declaration allows the state to request federal funding and other assistance for actions taken prior to Sandy's landfall.

== Impact ==
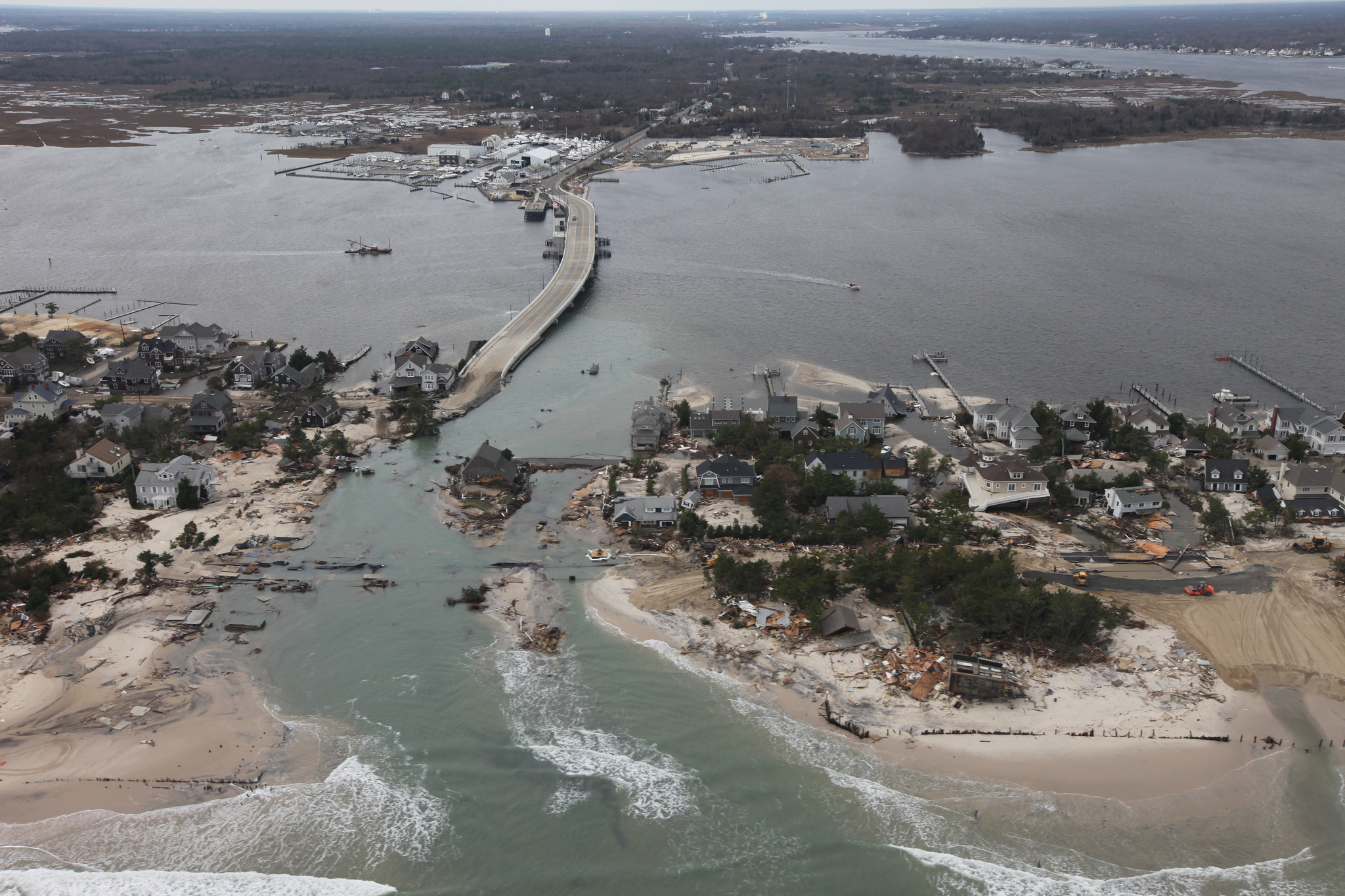
Damage in Mantoloking, where high waves created a new temporary inlet

On October 29, about two and a half hours from its New Jersey landfall, Sandy transitioned into an extratropical cyclone as it encountered cooler waters and a cold air mass. At about 23:30 Coordinated Universal Time (7:30 p.m. EDT), the center of former hurricane Sandy made landfall near Brigantine in Atlantic County, with maximum sustained winds of about 80 mph (130 km/h). The highest wind gust in the state was 91 mph (146 km/h) in Atlantic City. At the Atlantic City Marina, a barometer recorded a minimum barometric pressure of 945.5 mbar (27.92 inHg), which set a record for the city, and was the lowest pressure ever recorded in the United States north of North Carolina. The state capital Trenton also recorded its lowest ever pressure – 958.7 mbar (28.31 inHg). Sandy dropped heavy rainfall across the state as it approached and later moved across the state. The statewide peak precipitation total was 11.91 in (303 mm), recorded in Wildwood Crest. This made it the 6th wettest tropical cyclone in the state.

The most damaging aspects of Sandy were from its high waves, estimated from 12 to 24 ft (3.7 to 7.3 m), as well as its storm surge, which is the rise in water above the normally expected high tide. Record-high water levels occurred in the state due to the storm's fast motion toward the coast and its passage during the regular high tide. The highest water levels occurred north of the landfall point in Monmouth and Middlesex Counties, especially along the Raritan Bay, where the surge reached an estimated 4 to 9 ft (1.2 to 2.7 m). Along Sandy Hook at the northern end of Monmouth County, a tide gauge on a pier recorded a water level of 13.31 ft (4.06 m) above the average low tide, at which point the pier collapsed and the gauge stopped reporting. This indicated a storm surge of 8.57 ft (2.61 m), which broke the previous record high tide there by 2.87 ft (0.87 m), set by Hurricane Donna in 1960. The highest High water mark in the state was 8.9 ft (2.7 m), measured at the Coast Guard station in Sandy Hook. The most significant flooding in the state occurred in the areas around Lower New York Bay, Raritan Bay, and the Raritan River. Along the Jersey Shore, the high water levels inundated several barrier islands, with a new temporary inlet created in Mantoloking. Most coastal towns in New Jersey suffered beach erosion due to Sandy's waves, and on average, beaches were 30 to 40 ft (9.1 to 12.2 m) narrower after the storm. However, some beaches in the extreme southern end of the state grew in size. As Sandy entered Pennsylvania, a strong southeasterly flow produced record flooding along the Delaware Bay and Delaware River.

Across New Jersey, 38 people died due in part to Sandy, including 12 fatalities directly related to the hurricane's impacts. The large swath of strong winds and widespread flooding produced the costliest natural disaster in the history of New Jersey, with damage estimated at $29.4 billion. This far surpassed the $1 billion damage total Hurricane Irene from the 2011, the state's previous costliest natural disaster. Damage was heaviest in Ocean and Monmouth counties. Statewide, Sandy damaged 346,000 homes, with about 30,000 homes and businesses destroyed or significantly damaged. The storm's high winds and heavy rainfall knocked down or damaged more than 113,000 trees across the state, many of which fell onto power lines, leaving about 2.7-million New Jerseyans without power. The power outages affected 70 water systems and 80 sewage systems. High waters sank 1,400 boats.

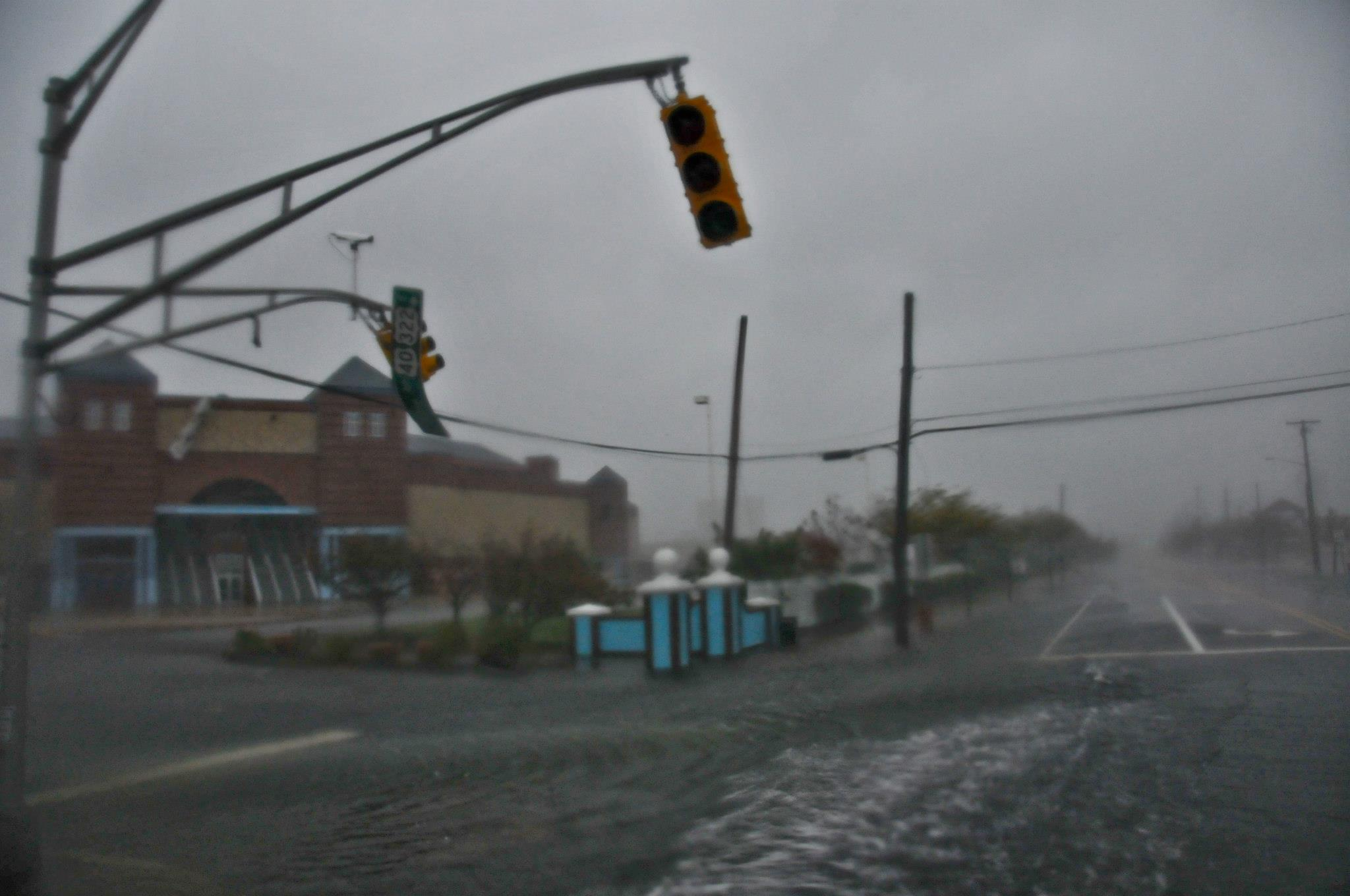
Flooding and damage along Albany Avenue in Atlantic City

An analysis of aerial imagery conducted by the Federal Emergency Management Agency (FEMA) indicated that approximately 72,000 homes and business in New Jersey were damaged or destroyed by the storm, with over 40,000 of the buildings affected being in Ocean County. Based on this analysis, 507 buildings were destroyed, 5051 suffered major structural damage, and 66,212 incurred limited damage. U.S. Congressman Chris Smith stated on January 2, 2013, that 346,000 homes in New Jersey were damaged by Sandy, of which 22,000 were rendered uninhabitable.

=== Atlantic County ===
Former Hurricane Sandy made landfall in Atlantic County, just north of Atlantic City. Most of the eastern portion of the county suffered from the effects of high winds and tides. Atlantic City recorded a storm surge of 5.82 ft (1.77 m), as well as 8.15 in (207 mm) of rainfall. The highest tide – 8.9 ft (2.7 m) above mean low water – was the second-highest ever recorded at the station, only behind the December 1992 nor'easter. High floodwaters temporarily cut off travel between the city and the mainland. High waves destroyed the northern end of the Atlantic City boardwalk, which was already scheduled to be removed. In the city, more than 5,000 housing units were damaged during Sandy, which represented 11% of the statewide number of damaged units. Significant tidal damage also occurred elsewhere on Absecon Island, which includes the municipalities of Ventnor, Margate, and Longport. An elderly man in Ventnor struck his head and died while moving his car away from floodwaters. Part of the Ocean City-Longport Bridge was closed when high seas washed boulders onto it. A travel ban was put into effect after sunset due to the storm.

=== Ocean County ===
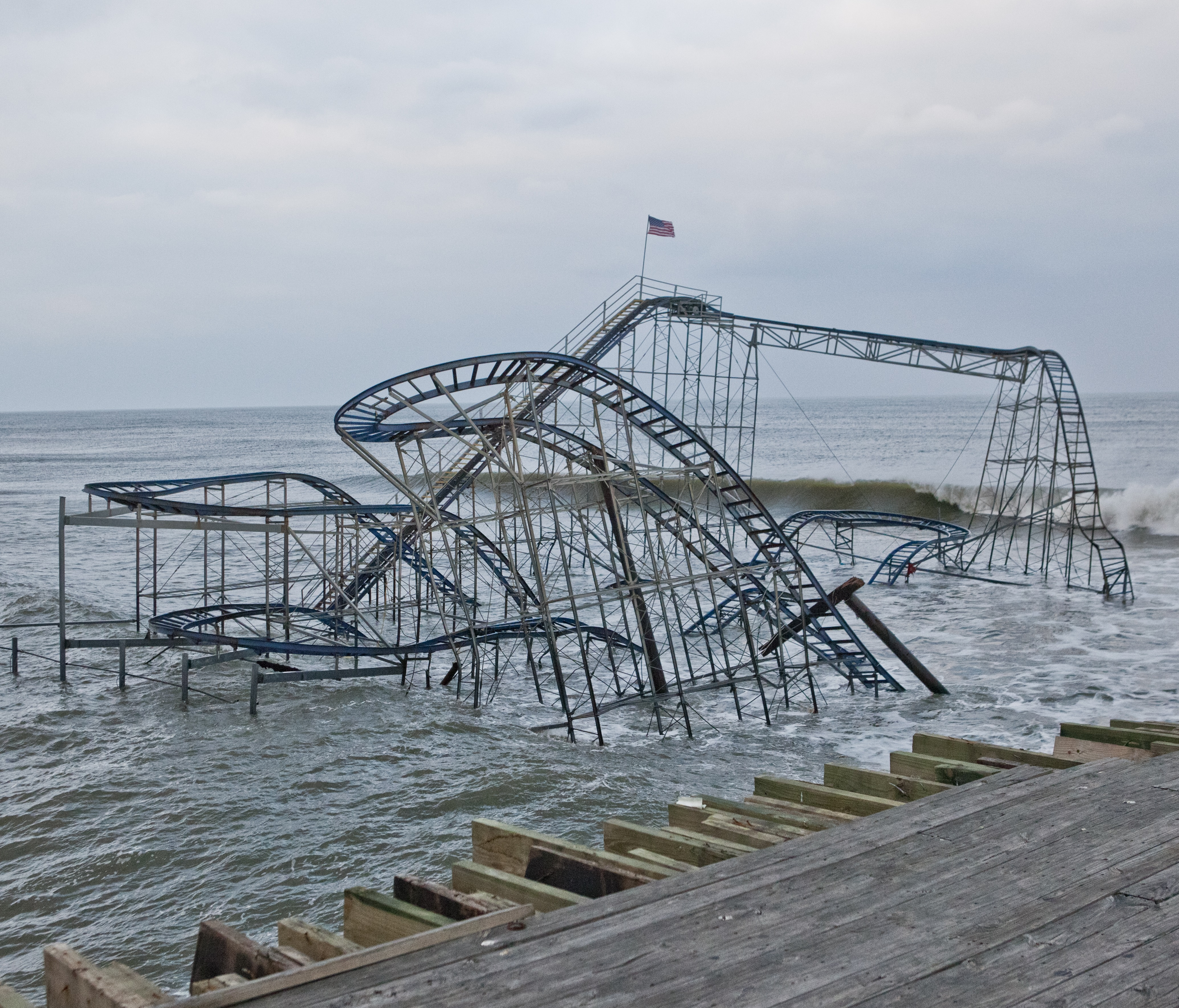
The submerged Star Jet roller coaster at the damaged Casino Pier in Seaside Heights

In Ocean County, located north of Atlantic County, damage was severest in the eastern portion of the county, including Long Beach Island, the Barnegat Peninsula, and along the Barnegat Bay. Damage in the county was worst along the Barnegat Peninsula, with parts of Seaside Park inundated by 4.4 ft (1.3 m) of floodwaters. High tides in Mantoloking created a temporary inlet and swept away several homes, with such severe damage that residents were not allowed to move back until February 2013, or about three months after the storm. Also in Mantoloking, ruptured natural gas lines ignited fires, destroying 14 homes.

In Seaside Heights, toward the southern end of the Barnegat Peninsula, the storm washed away a 50 ft (15 m) portion of Funtown Pier, a local amusement park. Damage surpassed $1 million, with 40 of the 44 rides damaged. In the same city, a portion of Casino Pier collapsed into the ocean due to intense waves, with all of its roller coasters damaged, and a haunted house washed ashore nine miles (15 km) away. The Star Jet roller coaster fell off the damaged pier into the ocean but remained largely intact. Most of the rides in these amusement parks were destroyed, including roller coasters.

The seaside communities on Long Beach Island were among the hardest-hit. Scores of homes and business were destroyed and the storm surge deposited up to four feet of sand on island streets, making them impassable. Governor Christie issued a mandatory evacuation on October 28, and residents and business owners were prohibited from returning until November 10. The island's estimated monetary damage was over $750 million.

Mantoloking was especially hard hit, suffering severe "wash over" including the creation of two new, temporary inlets. Approximately two dozen oceanfront houses in Mantoloking were completely removed from their foundations and destroyed.

As of May 18, homeowners of Ortley Beach still had not been allowed onto the Barrier Island to check on their properties. Ortley Beach was declared "Ground Zero" because of the unbelievable amount of devastation.

Two people drowned on the Ocean County mainland – a 72-year-old in Mystic Island, and a 61-year-old in his house in Brick Township. Also in Brick, a 61-year-old died while attempting to remove a tree stump. Wind gusts reached 88 mph (142 km/h) in Tuckerton. The Oyster Creek Nuclear Generating Station in Lacey Township issued an alert, the second-lowest on a four-level warning system, when storm waters rose 6 ft (1.8 m) above normal and entered the plant's intake system. The plant was not generating electricity at the time due to maintenance, and due to storm-related power outages, workers used generators to keep the reactor cool.

=== Monmouth County ===
High waters occurred on the ocean and the bay coastlines of Monmouth County. There was a high water mark of 7.9 ft (2.4 m) in Keyport. In Keansburg, the storm washed 3 ft (0.91 m) of sand in Keansburg Amusement Park. Hurricane Sandy forced the Sandy Hook section of Gateway National Recreation Area to close for six months. The Belmar boardwalk was also destroyed.

=== Middlesex County ===
Significant tidal flooding occurred along the Raritan River in Perth Amboy and Sayreville, destroying Perth Amboy's marina and waterfront and forcing people to leave their homes. High waters damaged a fuel tank at the Sewaren terminal, spilling 378,000 US gallons (1,430,000 litres) of low-sulfur diesel into the waterway; it was the largest oil spill in New Jersey in more than a decade. About 255,180 US gallons (966,000 litres) – the equivalent of 30 tanker trucks – spilled into the Arthur Kill and its tributaries, the tidal waterway separating New Jersey from Staten Island, New York. Within 24 hours, hundreds of workers used skimmers, trucks, barges, and other means to contain the spill, ultimately recovering 457,519 US gal (1,731,900 L) of oily water; much of the remaining spilt oil evaporated or dissipated. The spill killed at least seven birds and covered another seven birds. There was also a small oil spill at the Kinder Morgan terminal in Carteret.

=== Counties along the Delaware ===
At the southern tip of the state, Cape May County experienced high tides and flooding, although to a lesser extent than counties farther north. Coastal towns experienced some beach erosion. In Wildwood, floodwaters and storm debris caused minor damage to Morey's Piers.

In Salem County, the Salem Nuclear Power Plant was shut down by workers after high floodwaters and storm debris blocked four of the six water-circulating pumps. High tides also damaged the pier to the Fort Mott ferry crossing, causing it to be rerouted to Barber's Basin in Salem. The ferry returned to Fort Mott in 2015.

=== Hudson Waterfront ===
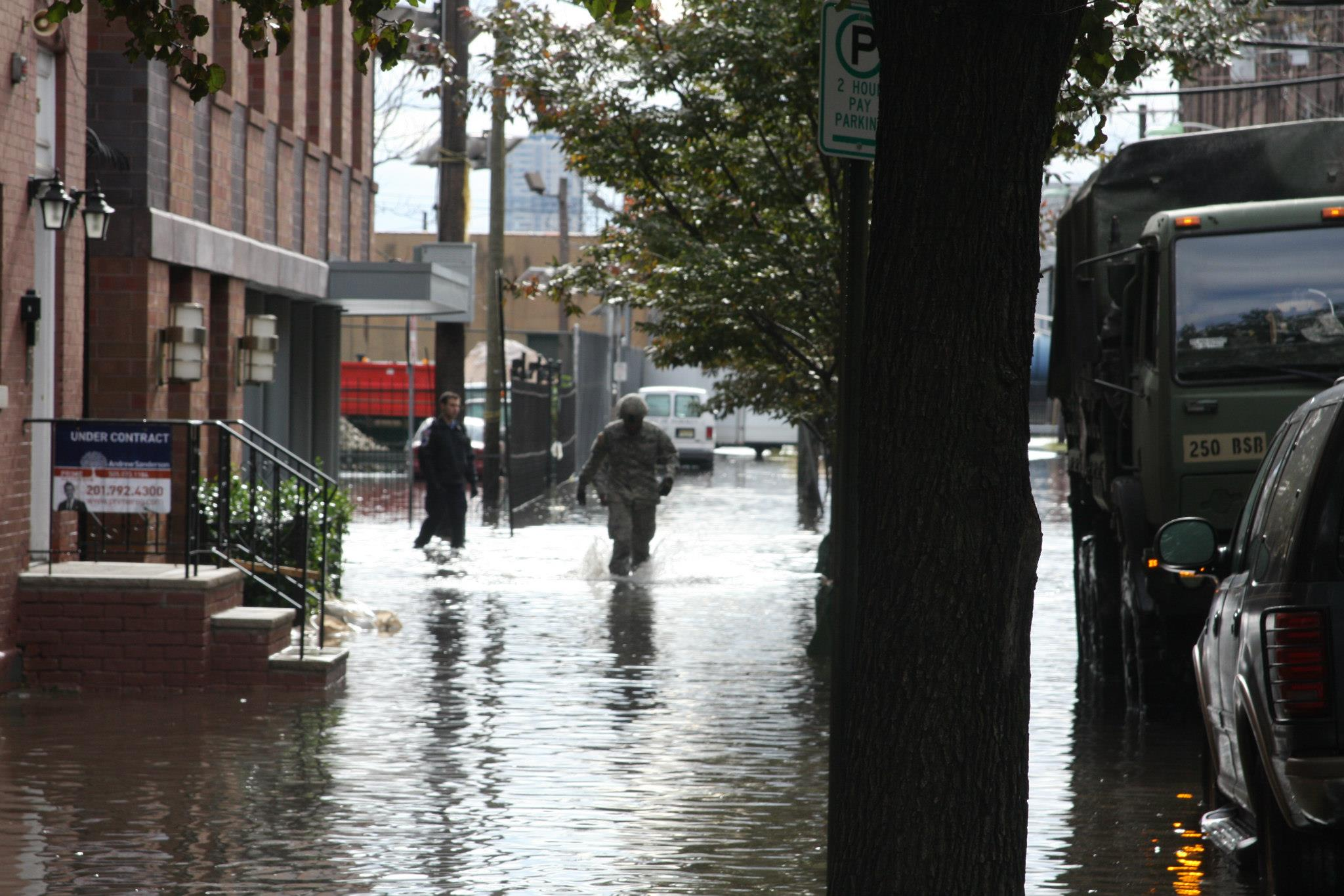
New Jersey National Guard in flooded Hoboken following Hurricane Sandy

Communities along the Hudson Waterfront were flooded by the storm surge through New York Bay and into the Hudson River. There were massive power outages in Bayonne, Jersey City, Hoboken, Weehawken, North Bergen, and Edgewater, forcing the evacuation of patients from Palisades Medical Center.

Half of Jersey City lost power, while large sections of the Downtown, including City Hall and the Jersey City Medical Center, flooded and had to be evacuated. As high tide approached, the Hudson River overflowed the wall at Exchange Place. Around the same time, Liberty Harbor spilled into the southern part of Marin Boulevard. Both breaches caused water to rush down Columbus Drive and Marin Boulevard where they met near the Historic Downtown. From there, the flood spread throughout the low-lying areas of Jersey City. At approximately 10:30 pm EST, the water reached maximum height. In Paulus Hook, there were only a few intersections spared. Those included the rectangle of intersections from Greene/Montgomery through Warren/Morris with the exception of Warren/Montgomery, which only flooded about a foot. Power was lost several hours after Paulus Hook became an island, at around 9:30 pm EST on October 29.

Half the city of Hoboken was flooded and the city government evacuated two of its fire stations. Hoboken's mayor asked for National Guard help. By late night October 30, an estimated 20,000 people were stranded in Hoboken, surrounded by water. The New Jersey National Guard was deployed and began assisting in rescues on October 31.

In Weehawken, the downtown neighborhood known as the Shades incurred terrible damage, with nearly every resident forced to temporarily relocate.

The storm was ranked #5 on The Hudson Reporter's 2013 list of the 50 most influential people and entities in Hudson County.

In the early morning of October 30, authorities in Bergen County, New Jersey, were evacuating residents after a berm overflowed and flooded several communities. Jeanne Baratta, Chief of Staff for Bergen County Executive Kathleen Donovan, said there were up to 5 feet (1.5 m) of water in the streets of Moonachie and Little Ferry. The state Office of Emergency Management said rescues also were underway in Carlstadt. Baratta said the three towns had been "devastated" by the flood of water.

Damaged tanks spilled around 7,700 US gallons (29,000 L) of fuel spilled from Phillips 66's Bayway Refinery in Linden, and its smell was noticeable in nearby homes. Workers repaired the tank and used vehicles to collect some of the fuel from the waterway.

=== Other areas ===
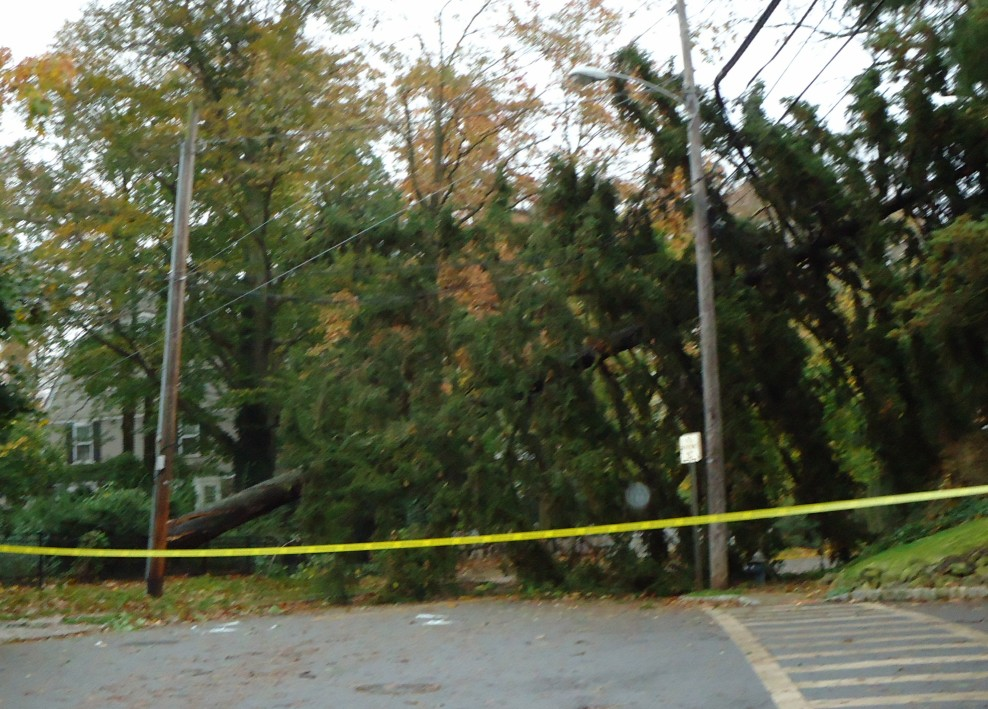
Downed tree in Summit

In Morristown, sustained winds peaked at 40 mph (64 km/h) with gusts to 68 mph (109 km/h). Other peaks gusts include 80 mph (130 km/h) in Clifton, 78 mph (126 km/h) in Newark, 74 mph (119 km/h) in Point Pleasant, and 61 mph (98 km/h) in Basking Ridge. Gusts along Long Beach Island peaked between 75 and 90 mph (121 and 145 km/h). Many buildings and homes were damaged especially to siding and roof surfaces. Hundreds of thousands of trees were downed across the state, especially in Morris and Sussex Counties in the northern half. In downtown Morristown, the Morris County Courthouse had a portion of its roof blown off in high gusts. In Edison, New Jersey, wind gusts near 86 mph knocked two large trees into each other, downing power lines that triggered explosions. The two trees slammed onto a resident's car, completely blowing out windows and smashing the trunk.

The rail operations center of New Jersey Transit was flooded by 8 feet (2.4 m) of water and an emergency generator was submerged. Floodwater damaged at least 65 locomotive engines and 257 rail cars. It was expected to be weeks before the resumption of service.

Basking Ridge New Jersey and the Somerset Hills area suffered numerous downed trees, downed power lines and road closures lasting for up to 2 weeks.

In Newark, the Passaic Valley Sewerage Commission's wastewater treatment facility lost power for three days and was flooded by tidal surge, resulting in billions of gallons of untreated and partially treated sewage being released into area waterways and destruction of critical equipment. Repairs were estimated to cost more than $100 million, and resilience investments may cost more than $700 million. Logan Hall, a halfway house in the Ironbound, lost power during the storm resulting in the escape of 15 inmates that were later rearrested.

=== Transportation ===
As of early morning October 31, nearly 3,000 flights had been cancelled. Newark Liberty Airport reopened in the afternoon of October 31. Teterboro Airport remained closed until November 1. New Jersey Transit was shut down in its entirety. Rail service was partly restored on Nov 1. PATH services were also shut down.

== Aftermath ==
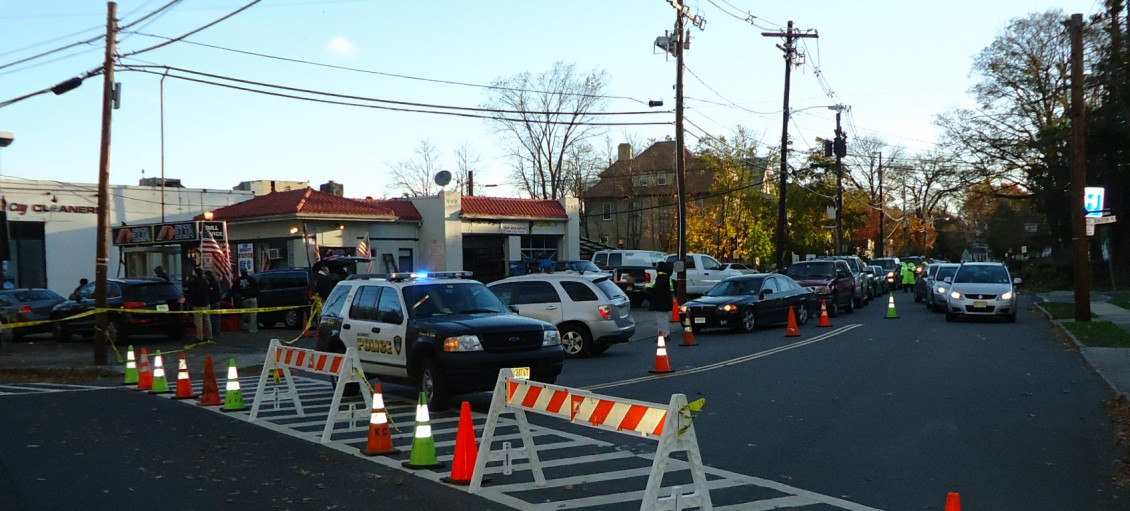
Line at gas station in Summit

Hurricane Sandy created the largest power outage in American history, with 8.5 million residents across 21 states affected, including 2.7 million households and businesses in New Jersey. This became a health hazard due to cool indoor temperatures. The power outages led to at least 13 fatalities in the state – four from hypothermia, three from carbon monoxide poisoning, two in a house fire caused by a generator, two in a house fire caused by candles, and two senior citizens from lack of oxygen. Electric companies worked immediately to restore the power grid, cutting down at least 93,000 trees and replacing more than 2,400 power poles. By a week after the storm, about 775,000 people in the state were still without power, Power restoration was disrupted by a nor'easter that swept the region 10 days after Sandy; the subsequent nor'easter produced heavy snowfall and 60 mph (97 km/h) gusts, causing additional power outages and tree damage, and forcing some coastal residents to evacuate again. Within 11 days of the storm, 95% of the state had their power restored; this was a faster rate of restoration than other widespread outages from natural disasters. Some places remained without power for two weeks, such as Hopatcong in the state's northernmost county, Sussex. Jersey Central Power & Light spent about $670 million in response to the storm. About 60% of the state's gas stations were closed after Sandy, forcing people to wait in line for hours to get fuel.

On October 29, the same day as Sandy's landfall, Governor Christie requested an expedited federal disaster declaration, which would allocate funds for individual public assistance and debris removal. The request included the four counties bordering the Atlantic Ocean – Cape May, Atlantic, Ocean, and Monmouth – as well as four counties in North Jersey – Essex, Hudson, Middlesex, and Union. United States President Barack Obama approved the disaster declaration on October 30, a day after Sandy's landfall. On October 31, Governor Christie welcomed President Obama to see the damaged areas along the Jersey Shore. Ultimately, about 130,000 applied for assistance through FEMA.

Governor Christie signed an executive order postponing Halloween until November 5. On the night of November 2, Governor Christie took action to prevent a fuel shortage and ease the problem of extended wait times and lines at gas stations by signing Executive Order 108, declaring a limited state of energy emergency with regard to the supply of motor fuel and implementing odd-even rationing for gasoline purchases in 12 New Jersey counties. Odd-even fuel sales took effect in the following counties at noon on November 3: Bergen, Essex, Hudson, Hunterdon, Middlesex, Morris, Monmouth, Passaic, Somerset, Sussex, Union, and Warren counties. This ended at 6 a.m. EST November 13. Governor Christie signed an executive order to suspend the Bergen County Sunday blue laws on November 4, allowing stores and malls to be open for the benefit of those severely affected by the hurricane. A week later, the blue laws were put back into effect. Governor Christie's approval rating increased from 48 percent in October to 67 percent on November 21. The governor estimated the cost to repair storm damage at $36.8 billion at the end of November 2012, requesting that amount from the federal government. The New Jersey government investigated many reports of price gouging. As of December 19, the state had filed lawsuits against 24 businesses: 13 hotels and 11 gas stations.

After a week, angry residents on the island communities, like Seaside Heights and Lavallette, wanted to know when they could go back to their property. Two people died after they were struck by a debris-cleaning vehicle.

Because of the storm, New Jersey allowed electronic voting on Election Day on November 6. Election officials were overwhelmed with requests and many votes were not counted. Voter turnout in the election was 67 percent, which was the lowest turnout for a presidential election in the state's history. Monmouth County suffered the largest decline in turnout, at 9.2 percent.

=== Transportation ===
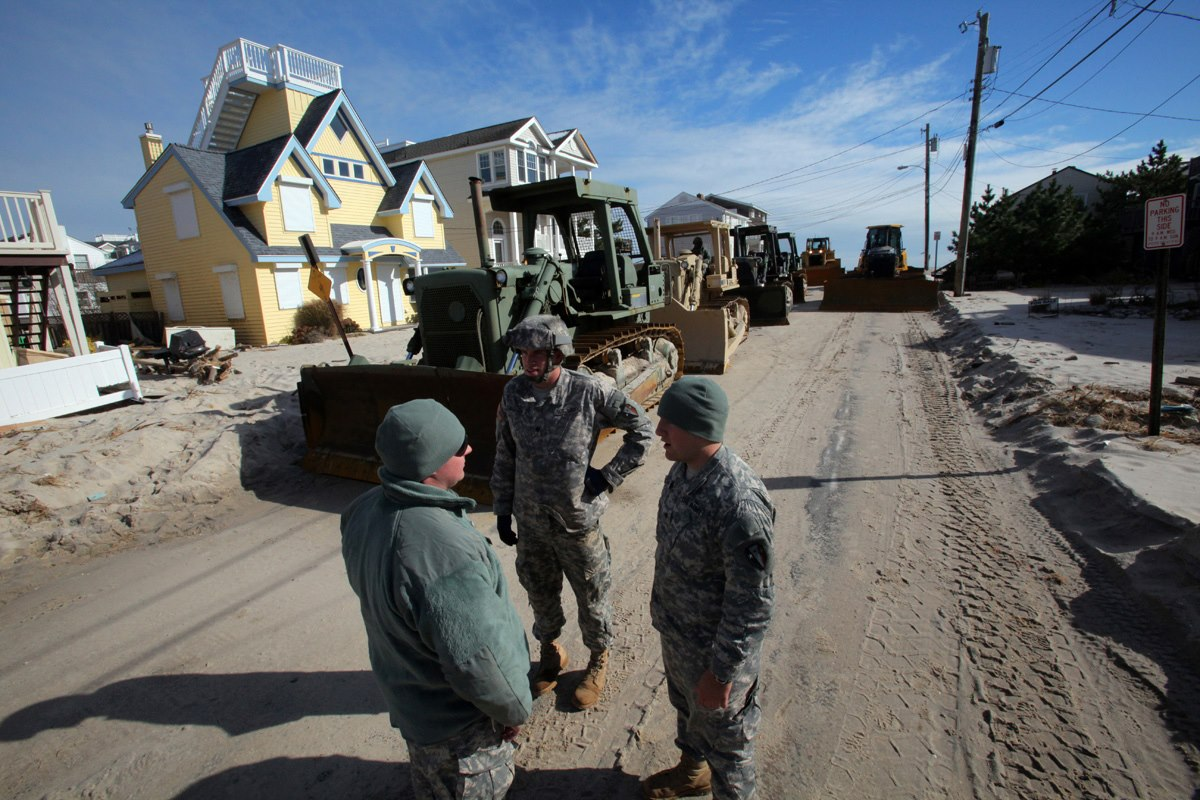
New Jersey National Guard workers clearing sand from streets in Holgate on Long Beach Island

Starting November 1, New Jersey Transit restored bus service on 68 bus routes in northern and central New Jersey and 18 bus routes in southern New Jersey, providing service over the entire routes with no detours or truncations. Partial service was scheduled to be restored on 58 bus routes in northern and central New Jersey and 17 routes in southern New Jersey, to operate with detours or truncations due to the impact from Hurricane Sandy.

On November 1, it was announced the state would receive $10 million in emergency transportation funding to help repair roads and bridges.

On November 2, NJ Transit began to run very limited service to Penn Station. Trains on the Northeast Corridor Line, North Jersey Coast Line, and Raritan Valley Line all ran some trains to Manhattan.

By November 4, NJ Transit was running limited service on the Main Line and the Metro-North Port Jervis Line, making all local stops and terminating at Secaucus Junction. The Port Jervis trains ran on the Main Line only; the Bergen County Line remained closed until further notice. The Raritan Valley Line operated only between Raritan and Newark. Although the modified Northeast Corridor service continued operating, the Princeton Branch shuttle remained out of service. Further south, the Atlantic City Line resumed operating normal service. The North Jersey Coast Line also resumed operating on November 4 only as far as Woodbridge (and skipping Avenel); however, after one day, this service was discontinued due to severe overcrowding, and NJCL passengers were directed instead to Metropark station.

SEPTA loaned 31 buses to NJ Transit to support shuttle service for New Jersey commuters going to New York City. DART First State loaned 20 buses from its Resort Transit service that had already ended for the season to NJ Transit to assist in transporting passengers.

As on November 6, part of PATH rail service to and from Midtown Manhattan resumed.

PATH train service between Manhattan and the Newark Penn and Harrison stations resumed in full on November 12.

Daytime PATH train service was scheduled to be restored to the World Trade Center station starting Monday, November 25 at 5 a.m. EST.

On January 28, 2013, PATH trains resumed overnight between Newark and the World Trade Center.

On January 30, 2013, full PATH train service between Hoboken and the World Trade Center resumed.

On February 1, 2013, Route 35 through Mantoloking was fully reopened after being closed since October 29, 2012 from damage from Hurricane Sandy.

=== Relief efforts ===
Time Warner Cable donated $500,000 to the Mayor's Fund to Advance New York City, and $50,000 each to the Red Cross of Northeastern New York and the Red Cross of Northern New Jersey. They also sent out vehicles with mobile charging stations and free WiFi access points, and opened all its WiFi spots in the city.

About 300 Marines from the 26th Marine Expeditionary Unit based out of Camp Lejeune, North Carolina landed in New Jersey and joined rescue, relief, and cleanup efforts.

The Massachusetts federally-owned TS Kennedy was sent to Elizabeth, New Jersey on November 4. The ship served as a "hotel" for emergency workers, power crews, and others helping the area.

FEMA stated that, as of November 4, $31 million in federal aid was approved for residents of New Jersey.

=== Long term aftermath ===
As of April 2013, many houses on Mantoloking remained damaged, although the post office was reopened and about 40 residents were able to move back by April 2013. By that time, about 39,000 families statewide were still unable to return to their homes, down from 161,000 after Sandy struck. Towns had to borrow money to pay for power restoration and police and fire workers before the federal government compensated them. There were new regulations on how high new homes had to be rebuilt to prevent future flooding. Boardwalks were rebuilt and beaches were restored, the latter due to a combination of natural processes and bulldozers. The roller coaster at Casino Pier in Seaside Heights was demolished on May 14, 2013, after sitting in the ocean for nearly six months. As of the 2016 summer, many oceanfront homes in Mantoloking had been rebuilt, while a stretch of several blocks had empty lots where homes once stood near the Mantoloking Bridge.

In July 2021, a nature preserve at Liberty State Park finally re-opened after a nearly 9-year closure.

== See also ==
- Effects of Hurricane Irene in New Jersey
- List of New Jersey hurricanes
- Stronger than the Storm
