= Britton Chance =

American biochemist and sailor (1913–2010)

Britton Chance ForMemRS
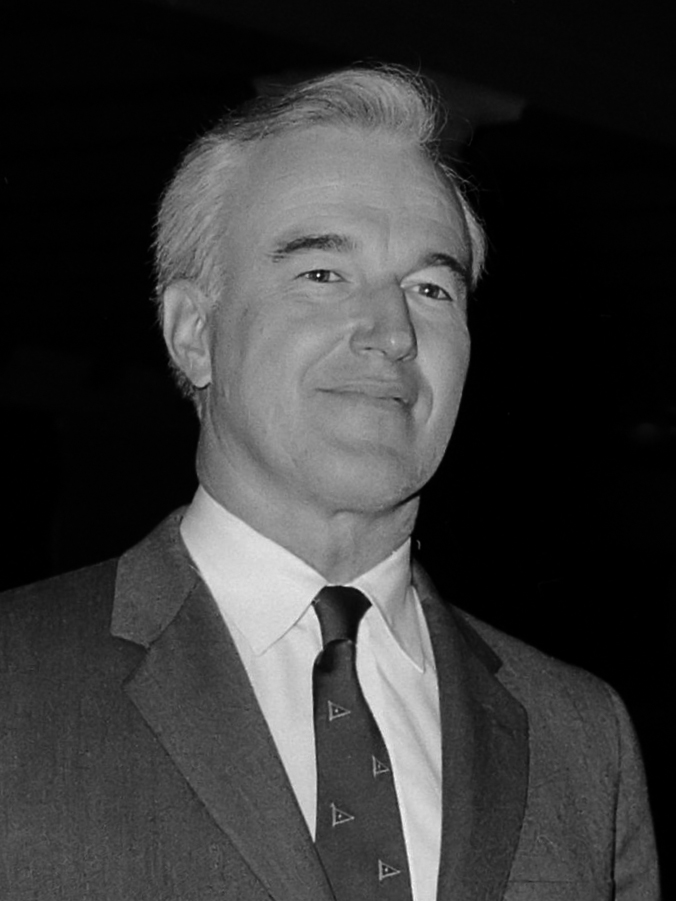
- Chance in 1965
- Born: July 24, 1913; Wilkes-Barre, Pennsylvania, U.S.
- Died: November 16, 2010 (aged 97); Philadelphia, Pennsylvania, U.S.
- Education: University of Pennsylvania BA 1935, MA 1936, Ph.D. 1940; Cambridge University, Ph.D. 1942
- Known for: Kinetics of fast enzyme-catalysed reactions Optical imaging MRI; Sailing
- Children: Britton Jr.; Jan
- Father: Edwin Mickley Chance
- Awards: National Medal of Science, President's Certificate of Merit; Olympic Gold medal in 5.5-meter sailing
- Scientific career
- Fields: Biophysics and Biochemistry
- Workplaces: University of Pennsylvania; National Cheng Kung University; Massachusetts Institute of Technology; Norwegian Nobel Institute; Medical Diagnostic Research Foundation

Medal record

Men's sailing

Representing the United States

Olympic Games
Gold medal – first place	1952 Helsinki	5.5 metre class

World Championship
Gold medal – first place	1962 Poole	5.5 metre class

Britton Chance (July 24, 1913 – November 16, 2010) was an American biochemist, biophysicist, scholar, and inventor whose work helped develop spectroscopy as a way to diagnose medical problems. He was "a world leader in transforming theoretical science into useful biomedical and clinical applications" and is considered "the founder of biomedical photonics." He received the National Medal of Science in 1974.

He also was an Olympic athlete who won a gold medal in sailing for the United States at the 1952 Summer Olympics in the 5.5 Metre Class.

== Early life and education ==
Chance was born in Wilkes-Barre, Pennsylvania. His parents were Eleanor Kent and Edwin Mickley Chance, president of United Engineers and Constructors, Inc, which built power plants. His father was also a mining engineer, chemist, and inventor who held a number of metallurgical patents and created a device that detected carbon monoxide in coal mines using a chemical reaction. Chance's paternal grandfather, Henry Martyn Chance, was a noted geologist and mining engineer who also had a medical degree.

When he was a teenager, the family moved to Haverford, Pennsylvania. His family had a summer home in Mantoloking, New Jersey where he learned to sail on his father's yacht Antares. He also sailed in Antilles and the Panama Canal Zone. When he was 13 years old, he became a licensed as a radiotelegraph operator and built his first powerful radio transmitter.

He graduated from the Haverford School in 1931. He attended the University of Pennsylvania where he received a bachelor's degree in physical chemistry in 1935, and a M.A. in microbiology in 1936. While at Penn, he was a member of St. Anthony Hall and of the professional and scientific honorary societies Alpha Chi Sigma, Sigma Tau, and Tau Beta Pi. He was also the business manager of The Pennsylvania Triangle, the engineering, architecture, and science student magazine. As a graduate student he developed a microflow version of a stopped-flow apparatus.

Around the time he was 17, he invented an auto-steering device for ships, receiving a patent in 1937. He tested the device on a trip to the West Indies using his father's yacht in 1935. In March 1938, the General Electric Company hired him to test the auto-steering device on a round trip from England to Australia on the MS New Zealand Star, a 20,000-ton refrigerator ship. In return, the company paid his tuition to Cambridge University.

In 1938, Chance enrolled in Cambridge University. He came back to the United States to visit his parents but was unable to return to Cambridge and England because of World War II. He returned to the University of Pennsylvania and received a Ph.D degree in physical chemistry in 1940.

In 1943, he received a second Ph.D. from Cambridge University in biology and physiology, followed by a D.Sc. from Cambridge in 1952.

== Career ==
In 1941, Chance became an assistant professor of biophysics and physical biochemistry in the school of medicine at the University of Pennsylvania. During World War II, he worked for the Radiation Laboratory at the Massachusetts Institute of Technology which was working on the development of radar. He became a member of the Steering Committee and head of the Precision Circuits Section, supervising some 300 physicists. They developed radar technology that allowed blimps to spot German submarines, as well as a "ground position indicator" to allow more accurate bombing. He also developed analog electronic computers to calculate non-linear processes and helped develop ENIAC, of the world's first general-purpose computer.

After World War II, he received a Guggenheim Fellowship that allowed him to work in Stockholm for two years with scientist Hugo Theorell at the Nobel Institute. Their work resulted in seven papers in the Journal of Biological Chemistry. It also let to Theorell winning the Nobel Prize in 1955.

In 1949, he became a professor of biophysics at the University of Pennsylvania School of Medicine and was appointed the second director of the Eldridge Reeves Johnson Foundation for Research in Medical Physics, a position he held until 1983. He was then appointed E. R. Johnson Professor of Biophysics and Physical Biochemistry (later renamed as Biochemistry and Biophysics) in 1964 and university professor in 1977.

Early in his career, Chance worked on enzyme structure and function, developing methods to study the pre-steady-state phase of reactions. He invented the now standard stopped-flow device to measure the existence of the enzyme-substrate complex in enzyme reaction. He is considered the founder of biomedical photonics, which is now a research field covering biology, medicine, and physics. Starting in the late 1980s, he developed various near-infrared spectroscopy and photon diffusion imaging methods. He was also a pioneer in the numerical simulations of biochemical reactions and metabolic pathways. In the 2000s, he developed molecular imaging beacons for cancer detection and diagnosis, predicting cancer aggressiveness in muscles, breast tissue, and the brain.

Chance became an emeritus professor at the University of Pennsylvania in 1983. He became the president of the Medical Diagnostic Research Foundation in Philadelphia in 1995. He was visiting distinguished chair professor at National Cheng Kung University in Taiwan, from 2009 to 2010.

== Publications ==
Chance published about 392 articles with 28947 citations (h = 92) as of 19 May 2022. The following is a selection of his key papers:

- Chance, B. and Theorell, H. "Studies on liver alcohol dehydrogenase 2. The kinetics of the compound of horse liver alcohol dehydrogenase and reduced diphosphopyridine nucleotide." Acta Chemica Scandinavica. 5 (7–8): 1127—1144 (1951)
- Chance, B. and Williams, G. R. "Respiratory enzymes in oxidative phosphorylation. I. Kinetics of oxygen utilization." Journal of Biological Chemistry. 217 (1) 383–393 (1955)
- Chance, B. and Williams, G.R. "The respiratory chain and oxidative phosphorylation." Advances in Enzymology and Related Subjects of Biochemistry. 17: 65–134 (1956)
- Chance, B; Ito, T. and Nishimura, M. "Studies on bacterial photophosphorylation 3. A sensitive and rapid method of determination of photophosphorylation." Biochimica et Biophysica Acta. 59 (1): 177–182 (1962)
- Chance, B. "Energy-linked reaction of calcium with mitochondria." Journal of Biological Chemistry. 240 (6): 27292728 (1965)
- Chance, B., Boveris, A. "Mitochondrial generation of hydrogen-peroxide – General properties and effect of hyperbaric-oxygen." Biochemical Journal. 134 (3): 707–716 (1973)
- Chance, B.; Sies, H. and Boveris, A. "Hydroperoxide metabolism in mammalian organs." Physiological Reviews. 59 (3): 527–605 (1979)
- Chance, B. and Yodh, A. "Spectroscopy and imaging with diffusing light." Physics Today. 48 (3): 34–40 (1995)

== Professional affiliations ==
Chance was elected to the United States National Academy of Sciences in 1950. He became a resident member of the American Philosophical Society in 1958, and served on President Dwight D. Eisenhower's Science Advisory Committee from 1959 to 1960.

He was elected as a foreign member of the Royal Swedish Academy of Sciences in Medical Sciences in 1968, the Wistar Institute in 1969, the German Academy of Sciences Leopoldina in 1971, the Royal Society in 1981, and The International Society for Optical Engineering in 2007. He also became a Fellow of the American Physical Society in 2007, and a Fellow in Institute for Corean-American Studies.

He was a Harvey Lecturer at the New York Academy of Medicine in 1954, a Phillips Lecturer at the University of Pittsburgh in 1956 and 1965, and a Pepper Lecturer at the University of Pennsylvania in 1957. In 1986, he gave the keynote address at the 152nd national meeting of the American Association for the Advancement of Science in Philadelphia.

He was a member of the American Academy of Arts and Sciences, the American Chemical Society, the Institute of Radio Engineers, and the Society of Biological Chemists. He cofounded the Biophysical Society and the Journal of Innovative Optical Health Sciences.

He was also vice president of the American Philosophical Society, chairman of the American Association for the Advancement of Science, president of the International Union of Pure and Applied Biophysics, president of the International Society of Oxygen Transport to Tissue, president for the Society for Free Radical Research International, and a board member of the International Federation of Institutes for Advanced Study.

== Awards ==
- President's Certificate of Merit, 1950
- Paul-Lewis Award in Enzyme Chemistry, Division of Biological Chemistry of the American Chemical Society, 1950
- Morlock Award, Institute of Electrical & Electronics Engineers, 1961
- Genootschapps Medaille, Dutch Biochemical Society, Netherlands, 1965
- Harrison Howe Award, Rochester Section, American Chemical Society, 1966
- Franklin Medal, Franklin Institute, 1966
- John Price Wetherill Medal, Franklin Institute, 1966
- Award for Excellence (Life Sciences), Pennsylvania, 1968
- Philadelphia Section Award, American Chemical Society, 1969
- Heineken Prize for Biochemistry and Biophysics, Netherlands Academy of Science and Letters,1970
- Nichols Award, New York Section, American Chemical Society, 1970
- Canada Gairdner International Award, Gairdner Foundation, Canada,1972
- National Medal of Science, United States,1974
- Semmelweis Medal, Hungary, 1974
- Award for Significant Contributions; Field of Biochemical Instruments, ISCO,1976
- Kappa Delta Elizabeth Winston Lanier Award, American Academy of Orthopaedic Surgeons, 1986
- Senior Investigator Award, American Heart Association, 1986
- Gold Medal for Distinguished Service to Medicine, College of Physicians, 1987
- Max Delbruck Prize in Biological Physics, American Physical Society, 1987
- Gold Medal, International Society of Magnetic Resonance in Medicine, 1988
- J. Henry Wilkinson Award, International Society for Clinical Enzymology, 1989
- Benjamin Franklin Medal for Distinguished Achievement in the Sciences, American Philosophical Society, 1990
- Christopher Columbus Discovery Award in Biomedical Research, National Institutes of Health, 1992
- John Scott Award, City of Philadelphia, 1992
- Honor Award, American College of Sports Medicine, 1999
- Liberty Award, Institute for Corean-American Studies, 2005
- Lifetime Achievement Award, International Society for Optical Engineering, 2005
- Gold Medal, American Roentgen Ray Society, 2006
- Distinguished Achievement Award, American Aging Association, 2006
- Friendship Award, China, 2008
- Molecular Imaging Achievement Award, Society for Molecular Imaging, 2008
- International Science and Technology Cooperation Award, 2009

== Honors ==
- The Stellar-Chance Laboratories at the University of Pennsylvania were named after him in 1995.
- He received honorary MDs from Karolinska Institute in 1962, University of Düsseldorf in 1991, University of Buenos Aires in 1993, University of Copenhagen in 1995, and University of Rome Tor Vergata in 1997.
- He received honorary D.Sc. degrees Medical College of Ohio in 1974, Semmelweis University in 1976, Hahnemann Medical College in 1977, National Cheng Kung University in 2008, University of Pennsylvania in 1985, and University of Helsinki in 1990.
- The International Society on Oxygen Transport to Tissue established The Britton Chance Award in honor of his long-standing commitment, interest, and contributions to the science and engineering aspects of oxygen transport to tissue and to the society.
- SPIE - The International Society for Optical Engineering established Britton Chance Biomedical Optics Award, presented annually to recognize outstanding contributions to the field of biomedical optics.
- He was an honorary president of the International Society of Oxygen Transport to Tissue.

== Sailing and Olympics ==
Chance won many sailing championships through the Barnegat Bay Yacht Racing Association from the late 1930s to the 1950s, including coming in first place for Class E Sloops in the first-ever Barnegat Bay Regatta in 1938. In the 1950s and 1960s, he competed in the United States Olympic sailing trials and also chaired the national governing body of sailing. In March 1952, he won the Giovannelli Cup with his sailboat Complex in a regatta off of Lido Dabaro, Italy.

For the 1952 Summer Olympics, 5.5-meter class was a new category. Chance earned a spot on the United States Olympic team for the 5.5-meter class because he was the only entry in the trials; he had a 5.5-meter craft, Complex II, custom built as soon as the new Olympic category was announced. His crew consisted of friends and former crewmates from the Mantoloking Yacht Club—teenager Michael Schoettle and twins Edgar White and Sumner White.

In July 1952 in Helsinki, Finland, the US team won an Olympic gold medal in the 5.5 Metre Class, with Chance serving as helmsman and captain of the Complex II. They won three of seven races in the competition, but only won the gold because, in the seventh race, Chance blocked Norway's Peder Lunde's wind, putting him out of contention. In 1955, he was elected treasurer of the United States Olympians, the organization of former Olympic athletes.

In 1956, he came in first place in Bermuda, winning the Edward Prince of Wales Trophy. In 1961, his team won the 5.5 Meter Class in the international Baltic Regatta sponsored by the U.S.S.R. He also won the 5.5 Metre Class World Championship in 1962 in England, sailing Complex III "with superb helmsmanship and clever sailing tactics"

Chance was inducted into the Barnegat Bay Sailing Hall of Fame in 2004. In an interview he said, "I wouldn't be without sailing. That would be unendurable for me."

== Personal ==
Chance married seventeen-year-old Jane Earle on March 4, 1938. The two spent their three-month-long honeymoon on a ship bound for Australia, testing one of his inventions for British General Electric Co.

Before divorcing, they had four children: Eleanor Chance, Britton Chance Jr., Jan Chance, and Peter Chance. His daughter Jan Change O'Malley was named US Sailor of the Year (now called US Sailing's Rolex Yachtswoman of the Year) in 1969, 1970, and 1977 by US Sailing. His son Britton was a naval architect who designed sailboats for the Olympics and the America's Cup.

He married Lilian Streeter Lucas in November 1956. They had 4 children: Margaret Chance, Lilian Chance, Benjamin Chance, and Samuel Chance. However, they also divorced.

In February 2010, he married his research associate and biochemist, Shoko Nioka, Ph.D. in Taiwan in a traditional Chinese ceremony. At the age of 97, Chance died in the Hospital of the University of Pennsylvania in Philadelphia in November 2010.
