= Sumner White =

American sailor

Medal record

Men's sailing

Representing the United States

Olympic Games
Gold medal – first place	1952 Helsinki	5.5 m class

Sumner Wheeler White III (November 17, 1929 – October 24, 1988) was an American sailor and Olympic champion. He was born in New York City and died in Summit, New Jersey. He competed at the 1952 Summer Olympics in Helsinki, where, contrary to expectation, he won a gold medal in the 5.5 metre class with the boat Complex II, together with Britton Chance and Edgar White.

Raised in Mantoloking, New Jersey together with his twin brother Edgar, he graduated from Harvard University.
