= Mantoloking, New Jersey =

Borough in Ocean County, New Jersey, US

- Borough
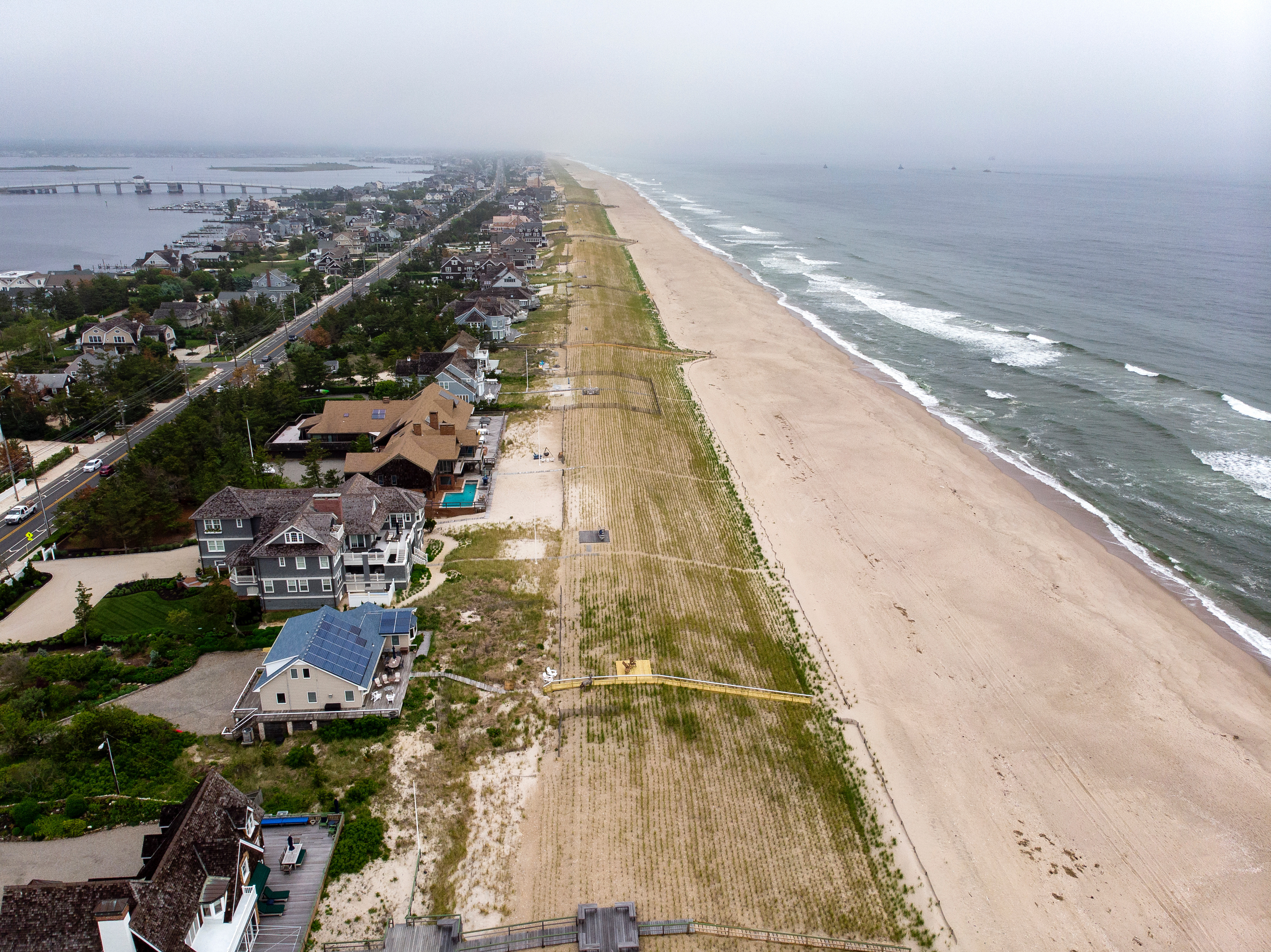
- Aerial view above Mantoloking

- Seal

- Location of Mantoloking in Ocean County highlighted in red (right). Inset map: Location of Ocean County in New Jersey highlighted in orange (left).

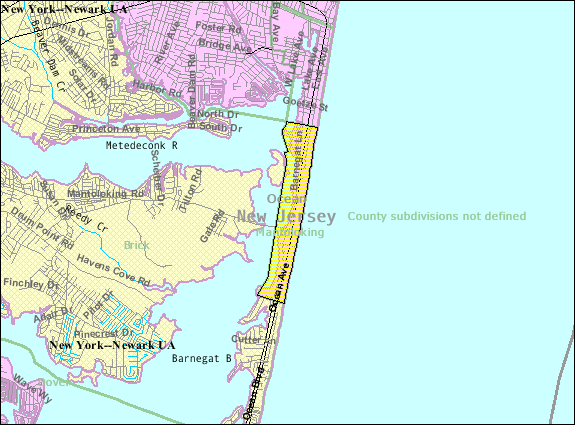
- Census Bureau map of Mantoloking, New Jersey

- Location in Ocean County Location in New Jersey Location in the United States
- Coordinates: 40.056688°N 74.04816°W
- Country: United States
- State: New Jersey
- County: Ocean
- Incorporated: April 10, 1911

Government
  - Type: Borough
  - Body: Borough Council
  - Mayor: E. Laurence "Lance" White III (R, term ends December 31, 2026)
  - Municipal clerk: Beverley A. Konopada

Area
  - Total: 0.64 sq mi (1.66 km^{2})
  - Land: 0.39 sq mi (1.00 km^{2})
  - Water: 0.25 sq mi (0.66 km^{2}) 39.69%
  - Rank: 533rd of 565 in state 31st of 33 in county
- Elevation: 0 ft (0 m)

Population (2020)
  - Total: 331
  - Estimate (2023): 332
  - Rank: 559th of 565 in state 33rd of 33 in county
  - Density: 857/sq mi (331/km^{2})
  - Rank: 401st of 565 in state 21st of 33 in county
- Time zone: UTC−05:00 (Eastern (EST))
  - Summer (DST): UTC−04:00 (Eastern (EDT))
- ZIP Code: 08738
- Area code: 732
- FIPS code: 3402943380
- GNIS feature ID: 0885290
- Website: www.mantoloking.org

Mantoloking (/ˌmæntəˈloʊkɪŋ/, MAN-ta-LO-king) is a coastal borough in Ocean County, in the U.S. state of New Jersey. As of the 2020 United States census, the borough's population was 331, an increase of 35 (+11.8%) from the 2010 census count of 296, which in turn reflected a decline of 127 (−30.0%) from the 423 counted in the 2000 census. The borough has an estimated summer population of approximately 5,000.

As of the 2000 census, Mantoloking was the highest-income community in the state of New Jersey with a per capita money income of $114,017 as of 1999, an increase of 29.8% from the $87,830 recorded in 1989. Based on data from the 2006–2010 American Community Survey, the borough had a per-capita income of $97,938, ranked 4th in the state. In the Forbes magazine 2012 rankings of "America's Most Expensive ZIP Codes", the borough was ranked 139th, with a median price of $1,403,349.

Mantoloking was incorporated as a borough by an act of the New Jersey Legislature on April 10, 1911, from portions of Brick Township. The name Mantoloking first appeared in 1881, and is a modern invention by one of its founders, Frederick W. Downer. Downer believed the site to be the original home of the Manta sub-tribe of the Lenni Lenape Native Americans. The Manta also lent their name to Mantua Creek and Mantua Township.

The borough is a Jersey Shore community situated on the Barnegat Peninsula, also known as Barnegat Bay Island, a long, narrow barrier island that separates Barnegat Bay from the Atlantic Ocean. The town is linked to the New Jersey-mainland via the Mantoloking Bridge, linking the town with Brick Township across the Barnegat Bay. Mantoloking is home to the Olympic-champion producing Mantoloking Yacht Club. Some old "summer cottages" in the borough were designed by architect Stanford White of McKim, Mead & White. Together with Bay Head to the north, Mantoloking is considered part of the Jersey Shore's "Gold Coast". It is a dry town where alcohol is not permitted to be sold by law.

== History ==
=== Impact of Hurricane Sandy ===
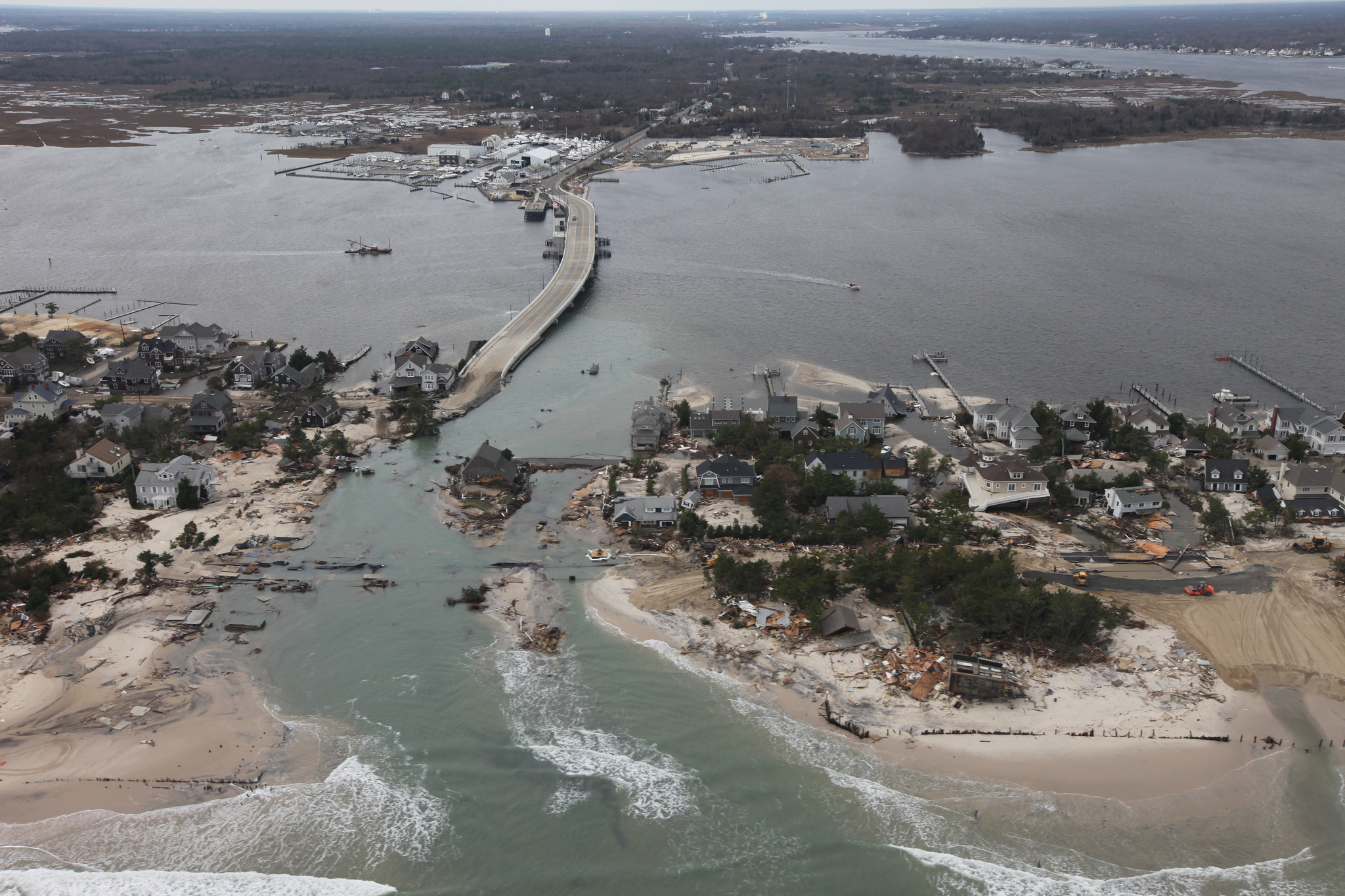
Breach of the barrier island in Mantoloking after Hurricane Sandy

During Hurricane Sandy in 2012, storm surge damaged about 90% of the properties in Mantoloking with the largest damage occurring when a breach was formed between the Barnegat Bay and the Atlantic Ocean in the vicinity of Herbert Street (CR 528).

When Hurricane Sandy made landfall in New Jersey on October 29, 2012, the effects were severe, and Mantoloking was especially hard hit, with more than 50 homes requiring demolition, accounting for almost 10% of the housing units in the borough as of the 2010 Census. Verizon Communications announced in July 2013 that it won't rebuild its copper-wire based plain old telephone service to Mantoloking residents, instead providing them with its Voice Link wireless service, an effort that brought protests from the AARP. Residents have complained that many calls don't go through when dialed, that fax transmissions cannot be made, that 911 calls may be affected by network bottlenecks and that power outages would result in the loss of service.

== Geography ==
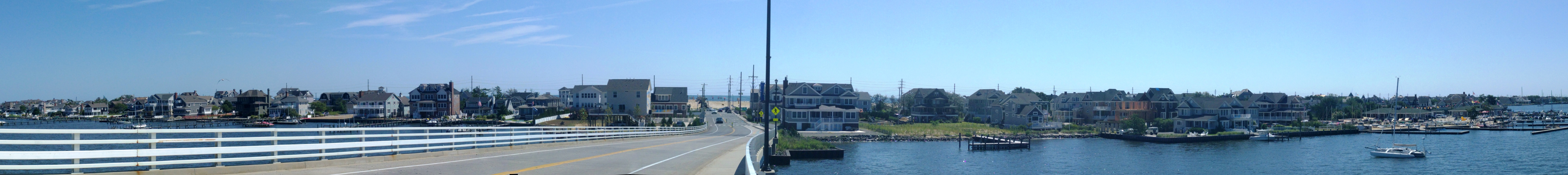
Panorama view of Mantoloking looking east from the Mantoloking Bridge (CR 528) in August 2016

According to the United States Census Bureau, the borough had a total area of 0.64 square miles (1.66 km^{2}), including 0.39 square miles (1.00 km^{2}) of land and 0.25 square miles (0.66 km^{2}) of water (39.69%).

The borough borders the Ocean County municipalities of Bay Head, Brick Township and Point Pleasant.

== Demographics ==
Historical population
| Census | Pop. | Note | %± |
|---|---|---|---|
| 1920 | 37 | | — |
| 1930 | 37 | | 0.0% |
| 1940 | 58 | | 56.8% |
| 1950 | 72 | | 24.1% |
| 1960 | 160 | | 122.2% |
| 1970 | 319 | | 99.4% |
| 1980 | 433 | | 35.7% |
| 1990 | 334 | | −22.9% |
| 2000 | 423 | | 26.6% |
| 2010 | 296 | | −30.0% |
| 2020 | 331 | | 11.8% |
| 2023 (est.) | 332 | ▲ | 0.3% |
Population sources: 1920–2000 1920; 1920–1930 1940–2000; 2000 2010 2020

=== 2010 census ===
The 2010 United States census counted 296 people, 162 households, and 103 families in the borough. The population density was 767.9 inhabitants per square mile (296.5/km^{2}). There were 535 housing units at an average density of 1,387.9 per square mile (535.9/km^{2}). The racial makeup was 94.93% (281) White, 1.69% (5) Black or African American, 0.34% (1) Native American, 0.34% (1) Asian, 0.00% (0) Pacific Islander, 2.36% (7) from other races, and 0.34% (1) from two or more races. Hispanic or Latino of any race were 2.36% (7) of the population.

Of the 162 households, 3.1% had children under the age of 18; 58.6% were married couples living together; 3.7% had a female householder with no husband present and 36.4% were non-families. Of all households, 35.2% were made up of individuals and 21.0% had someone living alone who was 65 years of age or older. The average household size was 1.77 and the average family size was 2.16.

4.1% of the population were under the age of 18, 2.4% from 18 to 24, 6.8% from 25 to 44, 39.2% from 45 to 64, and 47.6% who were 65 years of age or older. The median age was 64.4 years. For every 100 females, the population had 83.9 males. For every 100 females ages 18 and older there were 85.6 males.

The Census Bureau's 2006–2010 American Community Survey showed that (in 2010 inflation-adjusted dollars) median household income was $151,667 (with a margin of error of +/− $66,768) and the median family income was $200,833 (+/− $146,466). Males had a median income of $98,333 (+/− $210,103) versus $42,917 (+/− $32,621) for females. The per capita income for the borough was $97,938 (+/− $40,847). About none of families and none of the population were below the poverty line, including none of those under age 18 and none of those age 65 or over.

=== 2000 census ===
As of the 2000 United States census there were 423 people, 207 households, and 140 families residing in the borough. The population density was 958.6 inhabitants per square mile (370.1/km^{2}). There were 522 housing units at an average density of 1,183.0 per square mile (456.8/km^{2}). The racial makeup of the borough was 97.64% White, 1.65% African American, 0.47% Asian, 0.24% from other races. Hispanic or Latino of any race were 0.71% of the population.

There were 207 households, out of which 11.6% had children under the age of 18 living with them, 62.8% were married couples living together, 3.4% had a female householder with no husband present, and 31.9% were non-families. 30.4% of all households were made up of individuals, and 16.9% had someone living alone who was 65 years of age or older. The average household size was 2.02 and the average family size was 2.45.

In the borough the population was spread out, with 10.2% under the age of 18, 3.8% from 18 to 24, 10.6% from 25 to 44, 39.2% from 45 to 64, and 36.2% who were 65 years of age or older. The median age was 58 years. For every 100 females, there were 96.7 males. For every 100 females age 18 and over, there were 91.0 males.

The median income for a household in the borough was $105,841, and the median income for a family was $125,000. Males had a median income of $100,000 versus $64,167 for females. The per capita income for the borough was $114,017. None of the families and 0.8% of the population were living below the poverty line, including no under eighteens and 2.2% of those over 64.

== Government ==
=== Local government ===
Mantoloking is governed under the borough form of New Jersey municipal government, one of 218 municipalities (of the 564) statewide, making it the most common form of government in New Jersey. The governing body is comprised of the mayor and the borough council, with all positions elected at-large on a partisan basis as part of the November general election. The mayor is elected directly by the voters to a four-year term of office. The borough council includes six members elected to serve three-year terms on a staggered basis, with two seats coming up for election each year in a three-year cycle. The borough form of government used by Mantoloking is a "weak mayor / strong council" government in which council members act as the legislative body with the mayor presiding at meetings and voting only in the event of a tie. The mayor can veto ordinances subject to an override by a two-thirds majority vote of the council. The mayor makes committee and liaison assignments for council members, and most appointments are made by the mayor with the advice and consent of the council.

As of 2022, the mayor of Mantoloking is Republican E. Laurence "Lance" White III, whose term of office ends on December 31, 2022. Members of the Borough Council are Council President Lynn O'Mealia (R, 2022), Anthony M. Amarante (R, 2023), F. Bradford Batcha (R, 2024), Barbara Hood Benz (R, 2022), John Conti (D, 2024) and Douglas Nelson (R, 2023) -- D'Arcy Green (R, 2022).

The borough council appointed Barbara Benz in January 2021 to fill the seat expiring in December 2022 that was vacated by D’Arcy Green. Benz served on an interim basis until the November 2021 general election when she was elected to serve the remainder of the term of office.

In December 2018, Donald Ness was selected by the borough council to fill the seat expiring in December 2019 that became vacant following the resignation of Lynn O'Mealia earlier that month.

In 2018, the borough had an average property tax bill of $17,762, the highest in the county, compared to an average bill of $8,767 statewide.

=== Federal, state, and county representation ===
Mantoloking is located in the 4th Congressional District and is part of New Jersey's 10th state legislative district.

For the 119th United States Congress, New Jersey's 4th congressional district is represented by Chris Smith (R, Manchester Township). New Jersey is represented in the United States Senate by Democrats Cory Booker (Newark, term ends 2027) and Andy Kim (Moorestown, term ends 2031).

For the 2026–2027 session, the 10th legislative district of the New Jersey Legislature is represented in the State Senate by James W. Holzapfel (R, Toms River) and in the General Assembly by Paul Kanitra (R, Point Pleasant Beach) and Gregory P. McGuckin (R, Toms River).

Ocean County is governed by a Board of County Commissioners composed of five members who are elected on an at-large basis in partisan elections and serving staggered three-year terms of office, with either one or two seats coming up for election each year as part of the November general election. At an annual reorganization held in the beginning of January, the board chooses a director and a deputy director from among its members. As of 2025, Ocean County's Commissioners (with party affiliation, term-end year and residence) are:

John P. Kelly (R, 2025, Eagleswood Township), Virginia E. Haines (R, 2025, Toms River), Robert Arace (R, Manchester Township, 2027) Jennifer Bacchione (R, Berkeley Township, 2027) and Frank Sadeghi (R, 2026, Toms River).

Constitutional officers elected on a countywide basis are: Clerk Scott M. Colabella (R, 2025, Barnegat Light), Sheriff Michael G. Mastronardy (R, 2025; Toms River) and Surrogate Jeffrey Moran (R, 2028, Beachwood).

=== Politics ===
Presidential election results

United States presidential election results for Mantoloking
| Year | Republican | | Democratic | | Third party(ies) | |
| Year | No. | % | No. | % | No. | % |
|---|---|---|---|---|---|---|
| 2024 | 140 | 59.83% | 88 | 37.61% | 6 | 2.56% |
| 2020 | 150 | 61.98% | 87 | 35.95% | 5 | 2.07% |
| 2016 | 144 | 64.86% | 66 | 29.73% | 12 | 5.41% |
| 2012 | 180 | 80.72% | 39 | 17.49% | 4 | 1.79% |
| 2008 | 195 | 73.86% | 66 | 25.00% | 3 | 1.14% |
| 2004 | 200 | 75.76% | 59 | 22.35% | 5 | 1.89% |
| 2000 | 172 | 79.26% | 45 | 20.74% | 0 | 0.00% |
| 1996 | 208 | 77.32% | 49 | 18.22% | 12 | 4.46% |
| 1992 | 259 | 79.69% | 45 | 13.85% | 21 | 6.46% |
| 1988 | 289 | 88.92% | 35 | 10.77% | 1 | 0.31% |
| 1984 | 295 | 87.80% | 41 | 12.20% | 0 | 0.00% |
| 1980 | 291 | 82.44% | 33 | 9.35% | 29 | 8.22% |
| 1976 | 258 | 84.87% | 46 | 15.13% | 0 | 0.00% |
| 1972 | 215 | 91.88% | 19 | 8.12% | 0 | 0.00% |
| 1968 | 176 | 89.80% | 13 | 6.63% | 7 | 3.57% |
| 1964 | 147 | 83.05% | 30 | 16.95% | 0 | 0.00% |
| 1960 | 118 | 91.47% | 11 | 8.53% | 0 | 0.00% |
| 1956 | 128 | 94.12% | 8 | 5.88% | 0 | 0.00% |
| 1952 | 105 | 89.74% | 12 | 10.26% | 0 | 0.00% |
| 1948 | 57 | 90.48% | 6 | 9.52% | 0 | 0.00% |
| 1944 | 49 | 85.96% | 8 | 14.04% | 0 | 0.00% |
| 1940 | 59 | 86.76% | 9 | 13.24% | 0 | 0.00% |
| 1936 | 64 | 76.19% | 20 | 23.81% | 0 | 0.00% |
| 1932 | 59 | 79.73% | 15 | 20.27% | 0 | 0.00% |
| 1920 | 18 | 56.25% | 14 | 43.75% | 0 | 0.00% |
| 1916 | 9 | 69.23% | 4 | 30.77% | 0 | 0.00% |
| 1912 | 4 | 23.53% | 12 | 70.59% | 1 | 5.88% |

As of March 2011, there were a total of 324 registered voters in Mantoloking, of which 23 (7.1%) were registered as Democrats, 247 (76.2%) were registered as Republicans and 54 (16.7%) were registered as Unaffiliated. There were no voters registered to other parties. Among the borough's 2010 Census population, 109.5% (vs. 63.2% in Ocean County) were registered to vote, including 114.1% of those ages 18 and over (vs. 82.6% countywide).

Mantoloking is one of the most consistently Republican jurisdictions in the state of New Jersey. After New Jersey native Woodrow Wilson carried the borough in its inaugural election, no Democratic presidential candidate has done so again. Even as New Jersey has trended Democratic since the 1990s, Mantoloking has remained largely Republican, with 2016 and 2020 Republican nominee and president Donald Trump carrying the borough by over 25 points in both of his campaigns. Prior to Trump, all of the preceding 21 Republican nominees for president from Herbert Hoover in 1932 to Mitt Romney in 2012 won Mantoloking by a margin of at least 50 points, with 14 of them earning 80% of the vote, and Thomas Dewey in 1948, Dwight Eisenhower in 1956, and Richard Nixon in 1960 and 1972 each winning 90% of the vote.

Gubernatorial election results for Mantoloking
| Year | Republican | | Democratic | | Third party(ies) | |
| Year | No. | % | No. | % | No. | % |
|---|---|---|---|---|---|---|
| 2025 | 132 | 71.35% | 52 | 28.11% | 1 | 0.54% |
| 2021 | 137 | 76.97% | 40 | 22.47% | 1 | 0.56% |
| 2017 | 122 | 79.74% | 28 | 18.30% | 3 | 1.96% |
| 2013 | 152 | 92.68% | 12 | 7.32% | 0 | 0.00% |
| 2009 | 174 | 81.31% | 26 | 12.15% | 14 | 6.54% |
| 2005 | 166 | 81.77% | 28 | 13.79% | 9 | 4.43% |

In the 2013 gubernatorial election, Republican Chris Christie received 92.7% of the vote (152 cast), ahead of Democrat Barbara Buono with 7.3% (12 votes), and other candidates receiving no votes, among the 165 ballots cast by the borough's 307 registered voters (1 ballot was spoiled), for a turnout of 53.7%. In the 2009 gubernatorial election, Republican Chris Christie received 80.9% of the vote (174 ballots cast), ahead of Democrat Jon Corzine with 12.1% (26 votes), Independent Chris Daggett with 6.0% (13 votes) and other candidates with 0.5% (1 votes), among the 215 ballots cast by the borough's 336 registered voters, yielding a 64.0% turnout.

United States Senate election results for Mantoloking1
| Year | Republican | | Democratic | | Third party(ies) | |
| Year | No. | % | No. | % | No. | % |
|---|---|---|---|---|---|---|
| 2024 | 152 | 63.60% | 85 | 35.56% | 2 | 0.84% |
| 2018 | 155 | 76.73% | 43 | 21.29% | 4 | 1.98% |
| 2012 | 173 | 81.22% | 39 | 18.31% | 1 | 0.47% |
| 2006 | 177 | 80.09% | 42 | 19.00% | 2 | 0.90% |

United States Senate election results for Mantoloking2
| Year | Republican | | Democratic | | Third party(ies) | |
| Year | No. | % | No. | % | No. | % |
|---|---|---|---|---|---|---|
| 2020 | 168 | 70.29% | 69 | 28.87% | 2 | 0.84% |
| 2014 | 113 | 73.38% | 37 | 24.03% | 4 | 2.60% |
| 2013 | 82 | 67.21% | 40 | 32.79% | 0 | 0.00% |
| 2008 | 212 | 83.79% | 39 | 15.42% | 2 | 0.79% |

== Education ==
Students in Mantoloking attend public school in Point Pleasant Beach for kindergarten through twelfth grade as part of a sending/receiving relationship with the Point Pleasant Beach School District. As of the 2023–24 school year, the district, comprised of two schools, had an enrollment of 646 students and 75.0 classroom teachers (on an FTE basis), for a student–teacher ratio of 8.6:1. Schools in the district (with 2023–24 enrollment data from the National Center for Education Statistics) are G. Harold Antrim Elementary School 310 students in grades PreK–8 and Point Pleasant Beach High School 326 students in grades 9–12. Students from Bay Head and Lavallette attend the district's high school as part of sending/receiving relationships.

== Transportation ==
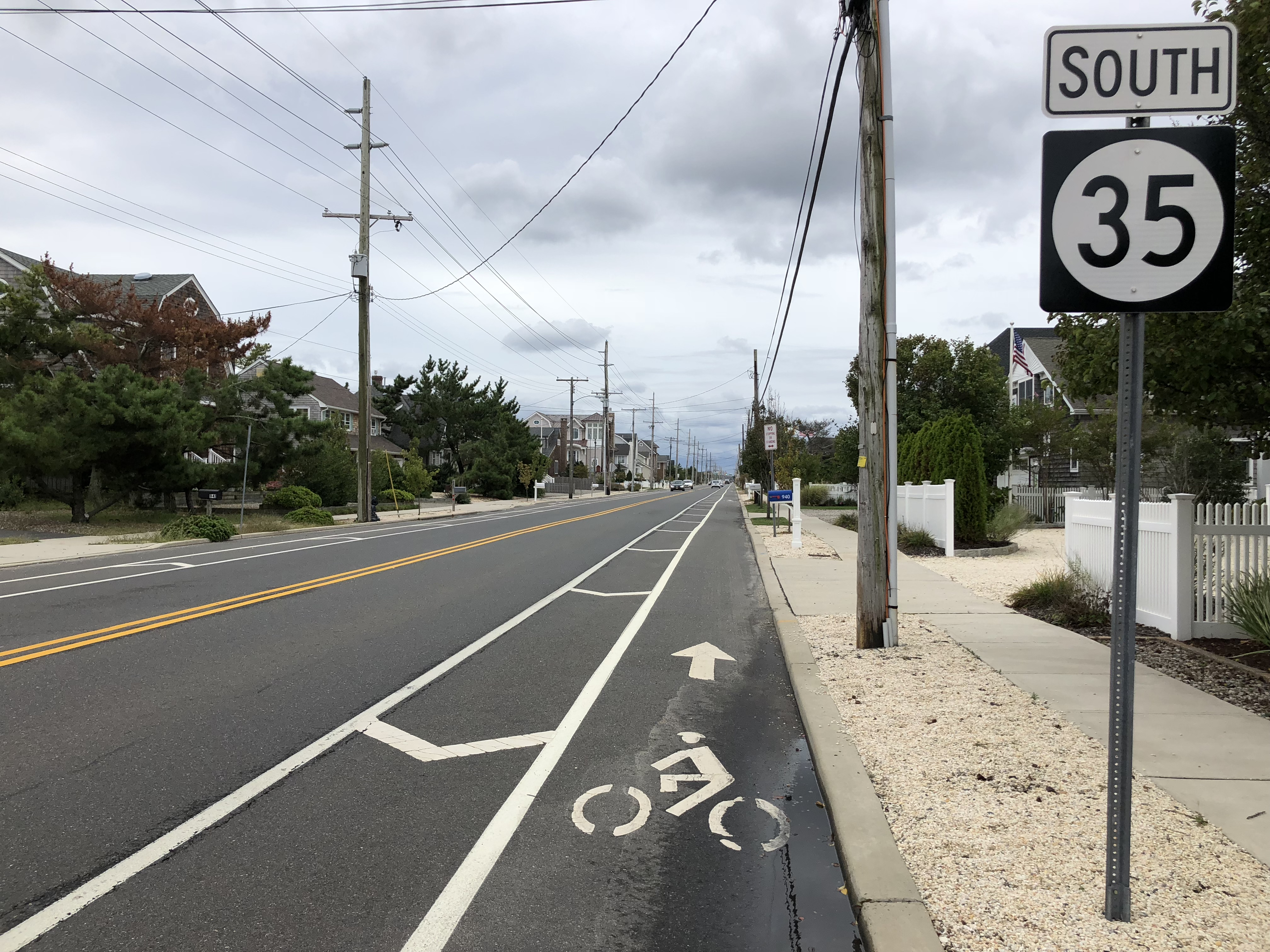
Route 35 southbound in Mantoloking

As of May 2010, the borough had a total of 6.42 miles (10.33 km) of roadways, of which 4.00 miles (6.44 km) were maintained by the municipality, 0.25 miles (0.40 km) by Ocean County and 2.17 miles (3.49 km) by the New Jersey Department of Transportation.

New Jersey Route 35 and County Route 528 are the main highways serving Mantoloking. Route 35 traverses the borough north to south, parallel to the coast, while CR 528 begins at Route 35 and heads west across Barnegat Bay to the mainland.

=== Public transportation ===
NJ Transit trains terminate at the Bay Head station and yard, located 1.5 miles (2.4 km) north of Mantoloking's northern border. Service on the North Jersey Coast Line north to Newark Penn Station and New York Penn Station in Midtown Manhattan.

== Climate ==
According to the Köppen climate classification system, Mantoloking has a humid subtropical climate (Cfa). Cfa climates are characterized by all months having an average mean temperature above 32.0 °F (0.0 °C), at least four months with an average mean temperature at or above 50.0 °F (10.0 °C), at least one month with an average mean temperature at or above 71.6 °F (22.0 °C) and no significant precipitation difference between seasons. During the summer months at Mantoloking, a cooling afternoon sea breeze is present on most days, but episodes of extreme heat and humidity can occur with heat index values at or above 95.0 °F (35.0 °C). On average, the wettest month of the year is July which corresponds with the annual peak in thunderstorm activity. During the winter months, episodes of extreme cold and wind can occur with wind chill values below 0.0 °F (−17.8 °C). The plant hardiness zone at Mantoloking Beach is 7a with an average annual extreme minimum air temperature of 3.5 °F (−15.8 °C). The average seasonal (November–April) snowfall total is 18 to 24 inches (46 to 61 cm) and the average snowiest month is February which corresponds with the annual peak in nor'easter activity.

Climate data for Mantoloking Beach, NJ (1981–2010 Averages)
| Month | Jan | Feb | Mar | Apr | May | Jun | Jul | Aug | Sep | Oct | Nov | Dec | Year |
|---|---|---|---|---|---|---|---|---|---|---|---|---|---|
| Mean daily maximum °F (°C) | 40.2 (4.6) | 42.7 (5.9) | 49.4 (9.7) | 59.1 (15.1) | 68.7 (20.4) | 78.0 (25.6) | 83.2 (28.4) | 82.0 (27.8) | 75.9 (24.4) | 65.3 (18.5) | 55.2 (12.9) | 45.0 (7.2) | 62.1 (16.7) |
| Daily mean °F (°C) | 32.6 (0.3) | 34.7 (1.5) | 41.0 (5.0) | 50.4 (10.2) | 60.1 (15.6) | 69.5 (20.8) | 74.9 (23.8) | 73.9 (23.3) | 67.3 (19.6) | 56.2 (13.4) | 47.0 (8.3) | 37.3 (2.9) | 53.8 (12.1) |
| Mean daily minimum °F (°C) | 25.0 (−3.9) | 26.6 (−3.0) | 32.7 (0.4) | 41.7 (5.4) | 51.4 (10.8) | 61.1 (16.2) | 66.7 (19.3) | 65.8 (18.8) | 58.6 (14.8) | 47.0 (8.3) | 38.7 (3.7) | 29.6 (−1.3) | 45.5 (7.5) |
| Average precipitation inches (mm) | 3.66 (93) | 3.08 (78) | 4.20 (107) | 3.96 (101) | 3.51 (89) | 3.68 (93) | 4.65 (118) | 4.46 (113) | 3.49 (89) | 3.75 (95) | 3.94 (100) | 3.99 (101) | 46.37 (1,178) |
| Average relative humidity (%) | 64.9 | 62.5 | 60.8 | 62.3 | 65.7 | 70.3 | 69.9 | 71.5 | 71.3 | 69.9 | 68.0 | 66.3 | 67.0 |
| Average dew point °F (°C) | 22.1 (−5.5) | 23.2 (−4.9) | 28.5 (−1.9) | 38.0 (3.3) | 48.6 (9.2) | 59.4 (15.2) | 64.4 (18.0) | 64.1 (17.8) | 57.7 (14.3) | 46.5 (8.1) | 37.0 (2.8) | 27.1 (−2.7) | 43.1 (6.2) |
Source: PRISM

Climate data for Sandy Hook, NJ Ocean Water Temperature (30 N Mantoloking)
| Month | Jan | Feb | Mar | Apr | May | Jun | Jul | Aug | Sep | Oct | Nov | Dec | Year |
|---|---|---|---|---|---|---|---|---|---|---|---|---|---|
| Daily mean °F (°C) | 37 (3) | 36 (2) | 40 (4) | 46 (8) | 55 (13) | 62 (17) | 69 (21) | 72 (22) | 68 (20) | 59 (15) | 51 (11) | 43 (6) | 53 (12) |
Source: NOAA

== Ecology ==
According to the A. W. Kuchler U.S. potential natural vegetation types, Mantoloking would have a dominant vegetation type of Northern Cordgrass (73) with a dominant vegetation form of Coastal Prairie (20).

== Notable people ==
People who were born in, residents of, or otherwise closely associated with Mantoloking include:

- Britton Chance (1913–2010), Eldridge Reeves Johnson University Professor Emeritus of Biochemistry and Biophysics, who won a gold medal in sailing at the 1952 Summer Olympics in Helsinki along with fellow Mantoloking sailors, Edgar White and his twin brother Sumner
- Britton Chance Jr. (1940–2012), yacht designer
- Donald DiFrancesco (born 1944), former acting governor of the State of New Jersey and former president of the New Jersey State Senate, who spends summers here with his family
- Guy Gabrielson (1891–1976), politician who served as chairman of the Republican National Committee from 1949 to 1952, and was a member of the New Jersey General Assembly from 1925 to 1929
- James Gandolfini (1961–2013), actor who summered in Mantoloking, both in his childhood and as an adult
- Laura Barney Harding (1902–1992), longtime friend of Katharine Hepburn (1907–2003), owned a summer home on the Mantoloking oceanfront. Due to a long visit of Hepburn, people referred to it as Hepburn's house
- Robert J. Morris (1915–1997), anti-Communist activist, U.S. Senate candidate, President of the University of Dallas, founder of the University of Plano, founder of the Defenders of American Liberties and lecturer
- Richard Nixon (1913–1994), former vice president and president of the United States of America who summered here when he was vice president
- Jan O'Malley (born 1946), sailor who was named US Sailor of the Year three times
- Edgar White (1929–2014), sailor and Olympic champion at the 1952 Summer Olympics in Helsinki with Britton Chance and his twin brother Sumner
- Sumner White (1929–1988), sailor and Olympic champion at the 1952 Summer Olympics in Helsinki with Britton Chance and his twin brother Edgar

| Preceded by Bay Head | Beaches of New Jersey | Succeeded by Brick Township |
