= Edgar White =

American sailor (1929–2014)

Personal information
- Born: November 17, 1929 New York City, U.S.
- Died: January 7, 2014 (aged 84) Mantoloking, New Jersey, U.S.
Medal record
Sailing
Representing the United States
Olympic Games
Gold medal – first place	1952 Helsinki	5.5 m class

Edgar Pardee Earle White (November 17, 1929 – January 7, 2014) was an American sailor and Olympic champion. He competed at the 1952 Summer Olympics in Helsinki, where he won a gold medal in the 5.5 metre class with the boat Complex II, together with Britton Chance and Sumner White.

He was born in New York City, New York. Raised in Mantoloking, New Jersey, together with his twin brother Sumner, he graduated from Harvard College.
