= List of New Jersey locations by per capita income =

New Jersey is among the wealthiest states in the United States of America, with a per capita income of $35,928 (2012) and a personal per capita income of $50,781 (2010). Its median household income is $71,637 (2012) and its median family income is $87,389 (2012), both the second highest in the country. The median value of an owner-occupied housing unit is $337,900 (2012), ranked fifth in the country. New Jersey has the highest percentage of millionaire residents in the country with 7.12% of New Jersey households having $1 million or more liquid or investible assets, not including equity in homes.

New Jersey's proximity to the metropolitan giants of New York City and Philadelphia greatly influences its wealth. A vast majority of the state consists of suburbs of these two cities, an explanation for much of the state’s high incomes. Approximately 76% of New Jersey places have per capita incomes above the national average; however, according to the 2008-2012 American Community Survey, 9.9% (US average 14.9%) of the population lives below the poverty line. Three of the country's wealthiest counties are located in the north and central portion of the state, including Morris County (4th nationally), Somerset County (8th), and Hunterdon County (10th). There are also several seaside resorts along the New Jersey shoreline that are particularly wealthy, such as Mantoloking, Sea Girt, and Spring Lake along the coast close to New York and Sea Isle City, Avalon, and Stone Harbor in the south. Southern New Jersey, is less affluent overall, excluding several Philadelphia suburbs in Camden, Burlington and Gloucester Counties and the coast. Camden, the poorest city in the state, has a poverty rate of 35.5%. Other poor areas are the cities across the Hudson River from New York City, including Newark, Paterson, and Passaic.

In 2012, 9.1% of New Jersey households have annual incomes of or over $200,000, and 17.5% have incomes of $100,000 or more. By contrast, 5.3% have incomes of less than $10,000, and 24.9% less than $34,999.

== New Jersey counties ranked by per capita income ==
Note: Data is from the 2020 United States census data and the 2018-2022 American Community Survey 5-Year Estimates.

Rank	County	Per capita income	Median household income	Population	Households
1	Hunterdon	$73,936	$142,518	129,777	50,515
2	Morris	$68,227	$131,795	511,151	194,141
3	Somerset	$67,395	$135,577	346,875	130,178
4	Monmouth	$63,610	$118,194	644,098	253,767
5	Bergen	$58,150	$114,336	952,997	354,937
6	Sussex	$56,363	$113,640	146,084	58,885
7	Cape May	$54,906	$84,870	95,634	48,563
8	Hudson	$52,911	$83,056	703,366	304,526
9	Union	$52,208	$98,028	569,815	202,575
	New Jersey	$51,272	$96,346	9,261,699	3,516,978
10	Burlington	$50,960	$100,478	466,103	176,334
11	Mercer	$50,652	$95,668	380,688	144,989
12	Middlesex	$47,221	$102,400	861,418	306,950
13	Essex	$47,158	$74,994	849,477	321,371
14	Warren	$45,188	$98,867	110,926	45,507
15	Gloucester	$44,186	$98,301	306,601	111,781
16	Camden	$42,651	$81,768	524,907	203,530
17	Ocean	$42,474	$81,101	655,735	241,983
18	Salem	$41,804	$77,898	65,117	25,221
	United States of America	$41,804	$74,755	333,287,550	129,870,930
19	Atlantic	$40,034	$77,248	275,638	106,972
20	Passaic	$37,516	$79,955	513,936	179,292
21	Cumberland	$30,214	$60,755	151,356	54,961

== New Jersey municipalities ranked by per capita income ==
This is a list of all municipalities in New Jersey ranked by per capita income based on data from the 2020 United States census and 2018-2022 American Community Survey.

Rank	Municipality	County	Per capita income	Median household income	Population	Households
1	Mantoloking Borough	Ocean	$159,649	$240,417	417	168
2	Sea Girt Borough	Monmouth	$140,648	$218,438	2,031	818
3	Rumson Borough	Monmouth	$136,277	$250,000+	7,285	2,303
4	Millburn Township	Essex	$132,666	$250,000+	21,699	7,102
5	Ho-Ho-Kus Borough	Bergen	$127,820	$250,000+	4,234	1,409
6	Mendham Township	Morris	$126,866	$240,962	6,005	2,034
7	Alpine Borough	Bergen	$124,312	$228,194	1,449	515
8	Stone Harbor Borough	Cape May	$123,693	$130,000	887	488
9	Saddle River Borough	Bergen	$120,964	$228,750	3,363	1,322
10	Chatham Township	Morris	$118,896	$208,910	10,930	3,849
11	Harding Township	Morris	$117,090	$147,344	3,868	1,521
12	Monmouth Beach Borough	Monmouth	$116,528	$144,792	3,199	1,520
13	Avalon Borough	Cape May	$115,095	$153,295	1,459	734
14	Harvey Cedars Borough	Ocean	$114,070	$125,313	479	241
15	Essex Fells Borough	Essex	$113,678	$247,000	2,290	726
16	Fair Haven Borough	Monmouth	$113,189	$229,643	6,221	2,106
17	Spring Lake Borough	Monmouth	$112,232	$157,250	2,788	1,268
18	Bernardsville Borough	Somerset	$106,706	$220,060	7,888	2,680
19	Summit City	Union	$104,469	$176,702	22,555	7,944
20	Mountain Lakes Borough	Morris	$104,161	$250,000+	4,499	1,430
21	Peapack–Gladstone Borough	Somerset	$103,719	$183,125	2,561	940
22	Sea Bright Borough	Monmouth	$103,242	$109,402	1,629	895
23	Upper Saddle River Borough	Bergen	$103,229	$234,476	8,313	2,602
24	Little Silver Borough	Monmouth	$102,990	$216,974	6,104	2,248
25	Wyckoff Township	Bergen	$102,827	$204,917	11,007	3,767
26	Hoboken City	Hudson	$102,492	$168,137	58,754	27,879
27	Longport Borough	Atlantic	$102,167	$101,250	776	436
28	Far Hills Borough	Somerset	$102,127	$145,139	1,047	417
29	Englewood Cliffs Borough	Bergen	$102,113	$213,261	5,347	1,860
30	North Caldwell Borough	Essex	$101,872	$215,000	6,625	2,208
31	Glen Ridge Borough	Essex	$101,252	$246,429	7,797	2,462
32	Mendham Borough	Morris	$100,692	$212,550	4,968	1,739
33	Chatham Borough	Morris	$99,651	$250,000+	9,199	2,950
34	Warren Township	Somerset	$99,225	$191,875	15,874	5,441
35	Long Beach Township	Ocean	$98,375	$110,938	3,135	1,514
36	Tenafly Borough	Bergen	$97,437	$207,652	15,299	5,076
37	Allenhurst Borough	Monmouth	$97,349	$95,625	412	175
38	Bay Head Borough	Ocean	$97,113	$127,500	1,096	480
39	Westfield Town	Union	$96,656	$203,235	30,839	10,426
40	Bernards Township	Somerset	$96,483	$174,072	27,768	10,048
41	Ridgewood Village	Bergen	$93,733	$211,224	26,043	8,692
42	Delaware Township	Hunterdon	$92,920	$166,863	4,557	1,728
43	Tewksbury Township	Hunterdon	$92,897	$176,932	5,881	2,291
44	Edgewater Borough	Bergen	$92,821	$136,806	14,394	7,024
45	Surf City Borough	Ocean	$92,668	$110,750	1,325	675
46	Allendale Borough	Bergen	$92,202	$163,875	6,817	2,271
47	Moorestown Township	Burlington	$91,987	$164,796	21,337	7,674
48	Montgomery Township	Somerset	$91,747	$224,185	23,558	8,102
49	Demarest Borough	Bergen	$91,523	$165,119	4,930	1,690
50	Morris Township	Morris	$91,497	$186,783	23,094	8,425
51	Franklin Lakes Borough	Bergen	$91,373	$184,458	16,802	5,837
52	Haddonfield Borough	Camden	$90,870	$178,362	12,456	4,232
53	Colts Neck Township	Monmouth	$90,780	$187,969	9,969	3,523
54	Avon-by-the-Sea Borough	Monmouth	$90,056	$106,563	1,792	868
55	Berkeley Heights Township	Union	$89,178	$196,389	13,120	4,486
56	Harrington Park Borough	Bergen	$89,088	$183,138	4,826	1,737
57	Livingston Township	Essex	$88,882	$202,619	31,091	10,378
58	Holmdel Township	Monmouth	$88,126	$169,242	17,369	6,182
59	Montclair Township	Essex	$87,955	$158,765	39,783	15,100
60	Chester Township	Morris	$87,076	$221,176	7,725	2,542
61	Bedminster Township	Somerset	$85,355	$126,190	8,245	4,122
62	Lambertville City	Hunterdon	$85,160	$102,482	4,127	2,012
63	Manasquan Borough	Monmouth	$84,708	$130,240	5,921	2,501
64	Pennington Borough	Mercer	$84,590	$166,957	2,780	1,138
65	Cranbury Township	Middlesex	$83,506	$198,281	4,048	1,369
66	New Providence Borough	Union	$83,403	$167,188	13,595	5,065
67	Princeton Borough	Mercer	$83,200	$176,695	30,450	8,951
68	Rocky Hill Borough	Somerset	$82,593	$126,250	794	295
69	Interlaken Borough	Monmouth	$81,984	$156,250	762	338
70	West Windsor Township	Mercer	$81,923	$183,024	29,445	10,982
71	Brielle Borough	Monmouth	$81,236	$160,845	4,957	1,846
72	Woodcliff Lake Borough	Bergen	$81,156	$227,500	6,096	2,120
73	Lavallette Borough	Ocean	$80,917	$108,750	2,036	971
74	Scotch Plains Township	Union	$80,716	$179,241	24,740	8,836
75	Haworth Borough	Bergen	$80,677	$215,972	3,342	1,069
76	Beach Haven Borough	Ocean	$80,390	$110,815	1,061	491
77	Verona Township	Essex	$80,102	$153,236	14,438	5,821
78	Margate City	Atlantic	$79,711	$112,661	5,331	2,584
79	Mountainside Borough	Union	$79,245	$162,531	6,991	2,537
80	South Orange Village Township	Essex	$78,985	$174,795	18,249	5,776
81	River Vale Township	Bergen	$78,914	$182,708	9,885	3,440
82	Old Tappan Borough	Bergen	$78,782	$195,833	5,863	1,930
83	Millstone Township	Monmouth	$78,591	$190,559	10,371	3,574
84	Seaside Park Borough	Ocean	$76,859	$80,658	1,799	950
85	Washington Township (Morris County)	Morris	$76,808	$176,351	18,188	6,352
86	Weehawken Township	Hudson	$76,584	$120,395	16,790	7,862
87	Long Hill Township	Morris	$76,000	$155,785	8,630	2,875
88	Atlantic Highlands Borough	Monmouth	$75,946	$118,591	4,409	1,907
89	Readington Township	Hunterdon	$75,840	$141,802	16,173	6,282
90	Kinnelon Borough	Morris	$75,346	$170,905	9,986	3,347
91	Marlboro Township	Monmouth	$75,314	$170,357	41,480	14,004
92	Hopewell Township (Mercer County)	Mercer	$75,192	$178,631	17,521	5,962
93	Oradell Borough	Bergen	$75,156	$196,023	8,208	2,733
94	Boonton Township	Morris	$75,042	$168,558	4,377	1,411
95	Maplewood Township	Essex	$74,936	$165,681	25,384	8,401
96	Ramsey Borough	Bergen	$74,913	$160,589	14,739	5,221
97	Upper Freehold Township	Monmouth	$74,852	$170,033	7,244	2,505
98	Montvale Borough	Bergen	$74,722	$175,179	8,413	3,066
99	Ship Bottom Borough	Ocean	$74,531	$95,208	995	500
100	Chester Borough	Morris	$74,526	$142,857	1,480	582
101	Montville Township	Morris	$74,511	$161,108	22,364	8,053
102	Glen Rock Borough	Bergen	$74,312	$202,586	12,086	3,652
103	Raritan Township	Hunterdon	$74,025	$155,925	23,649	8,772
104	Linwood City	Atlantic	$73,858	$133,487	6,952	2,655
105	Fanwood Borough	Union	$73,487	$177,727	7,723	2,808
106	Watchung Borough	Somerset	$73,470	$157,065	6,417	2,218
107	West Caldwell Township	Essex	$73,372	$148,402	10,927	4,161
108	Hopewell Borough	Mercer	$73,207	$137,138	1,825	755
109	Randolph Township	Morris	$73,203	$171,577	26,451	9,159
110	Bethlehem Township	Hunterdon	$73,008	$156,875	3,758	1,341
111	Cranford Township	Union	$72,825	$152,941	23,838	9,164
112	Branchburg Township	Somerset	$72,786	$163,800	14,882	5,560
113	Washington Township (Bergen County)	Bergen	$72,626	$155,930	9,268	3,362
114	Medford Township	Burlington	$72,531	$154,446	24,388	9,067
115	Highlands Borough	Monmouth	$72,422	$86,901	4,646	2,515
116	Sparta Township	Sussex	$72,075	$159,595	19,775	7,176
117	River Edge Borough	Bergen	$71,926	$150,073	12,022	4,369
118	Andover Township	Sussex	$71,505	$111,458	6,020	2,180
119	Green Brook Township	Somerset	$71,452	$202,321	6,956	2,275
120	Hanover Township	Morris	$71,338	$146,063	14,602	5,872
121	Middletown Township	Monmouth	$71,272	$140,848	66,803	24,258
122	Sea Isle City	Cape May	$71,268	$90,703	2,047	1,127
123	Point Pleasant Beach Borough	Ocean	$71,222	$119,647	4,786	1,903
124	West Amwell Township	Hunterdon	$70,998	$128,380	2,989	1,156
125	Island Heights Borough	Ocean	$70,755	$105,089	1,521	727
126	North Wildwood City	Cape May	$70,156	$81,102	3,639	1,869
127	Morris Plains Borough	Morris	$70,117	$144,540	6,104	2,446
128	Alexandria Township	Hunterdon	$69,906	$146,133	4,827	1,781
129	Closter Borough	Bergen	$69,763	$181,652	8,555	2,721
130	Plainsboro Township	Middlesex	$69,534	$120,791	23,974	9,960
131	Hillsborough Township	Somerset	$69,494	$152,818	43,007	15,564
132	Cape May Point Borough	Cape May	$69,308	$82,679	155	85
133	Denville Township	Morris	$69,270	$156,406	17,084	6,425
134	Wenonah Borough	Gloucester	$68,636	$127,125	2,213	796
135	Loch Arbour Village	Monmouth	$68,603	$122,500	220	84
136	Roseland Borough	Essex	$68,547	$135,451	6,221	2,451
137	Franklin Township (Hunterdon County)	Hunterdon	$68,427	$151,563	3,248	1,185
138	Clinton Township	Hunterdon	$68,249	$156,601	13,445	4,719
139	Ocean City	Cape May	$68,244	$98,576	11,260	5,521
140	Fredon Township	Sussex	$67,918	$144,643	3,261	1,142
141	Shrewsbury Borough	Monmouth	$67,892	$158,065	4,138	1,388
142	Midland Park Borough	Bergen	$67,787	$136,326	7,022	2,893
143	Cresskill Borough	Bergen	$67,673	$162,430	9,105	3,060
144	Metuchen Borough	Middlesex	$67,457	$154,339	14,958	5,343
145	Spring Lake Heights Borough	Monmouth	$67,332	$104,143	4,864	2,414
146	Tinton Falls Borough	Monmouth	$67,122	$107,959	19,180	8,795
147	Red Bank Borough	Monmouth	$66,966	$89,500	12,868	6,084
148	Manalapan Township	Monmouth	$66,965	$147,717	40,639	14,776
149	Florham Park Borough	Morris	$66,939	$141,620	12,790	4,530
150	Port Republic City	Atlantic	$66,869	$128,611	980	434
151	Hillsdale Borough	Bergen	$66,663	$175,802	10,125	3,416
152	Oceanport Borough	Monmouth	$66,586	$132,723	6,119	2,459
153	Park Ridge Borough	Bergen	$66,515	$164,241	9,098	3,203
154	Belmar Borough	Monmouth	$66,508	$89,736	5,877	2,699
155	Morristown Town	Morris	$66,283	$113,926	20,126	8,949
156	Robbinsville Township	Mercer	$66,243	$161,526	15,413	5,786
157	Wall Township	Monmouth	$66,053	$137,165	26,450	10,081
158	Bridgewater Township	Somerset	$65,939	$158,514	46,079	16,276
159	East Amwell Township	Hunterdon	$65,664	$119,455	3,933	1,735
160	Monroe Township (Middlesex County)	Middlesex	$65,388	$107,541	48,012	20,995
161	Stockton Borough	Hunterdon	$65,380	$100,833	475	224
162	South Brunswick Township	Middlesex	$64,530	$139,975	46,719	16,803
163	Cape May City	Cape May	$64,513	$69,896	2,815	1,233
164	East Hanover Township	Morris	$64,500	$143,365	11,102	3,908
165	Green Township	Sussex	$64,266	$162,315	3,620	1,216
166	Mount Laurel Township	Burlington	$63,783	$111,272	44,929	18,904
167	Allamuchy Township	Warren	$63,718	$124,035	5,319	2,369
168	Brigantine City	Atlantic	$63,648	$91,307	7,784	3,748
169	Wayne Township	Passaic	$63,573	$147,740	54,143	18,907
170	Norwood Borough	Bergen	$63,518	$156,630	5,657	1,964
171	Voorhees Township	Camden	$63,511	$108,518	30,876	12,002
172	Hainesport Township	Burlington	$63,453	$123,018	6,024	2,459
173	Springfield Township (Burlington County)	Burlington	$63,199	$138,269	3,237	1,210
174	Lebanon Borough	Hunterdon	$63,113	$106,389	1,864	780
175	Springfield Township (Union County)	Union	$63,061	$141,759	17,011	6,610
176	Oakland Borough	Bergen	$62,874	$162,848	12,734	4,381
177	Fort Lee Borough	Bergen	$62,802	$101,573	39,799	18,312
178	Mahwah Township	Bergen	$62,760	$120,618	25,471	9,644
179	Ringwood Borough	Passaic	$62,750	$141,800	11,692	4,256
180	Cedar Grove Township	Essex	$62,733	$152,083	13,179	4,865
181	Westwood Borough	Bergen	$62,659	$160,466	11,241	4,239
182	Emerson Borough	Bergen	$62,132	$141,908	7,281	2,626
183	Leonia Borough	Bergen	$62,031	$110,679	9,273	3,433
184	Pequannock Township	Morris	$61,906	$114,757	15,561	6,210
185	Wood-Ridge Borough	Bergen	$61,861	$132,901	9,978	3,851
186	Rockaway Township	Morris	$61,823	$137,260	25,539	9,163
187	Deal Borough	Monmouth	$61,547	$73,380	645	249
188	Waldwick Borough	Bergen	$61,546	$150,861	10,068	3,423
189	Clinton Town	Hunterdon	$61,403	$137,688	2,775	1,091
190	Kingwood Township	Hunterdon	$61,379	$146,829	3,809	1,552
191	Rockleigh Borough	Bergen	$61,123	$206,250	567	78
192	Cherry Hill Township	Camden	$60,889	$123,640	76,728	29,787
193	Secaucus Town	Hudson	$60,425	$129,348	21,470	8,607
194	Harrison Township	Gloucester	$60,389	$173,375	13,603	4,181
195	Englewood City	Bergen	$60,297	$93,134	29,109	11,317
196	Caldwell Borough	Essex	$60,262	$117,879	8,897	3,628
197	Fair Lawn Borough	Bergen	$60,255	$141,540	34,948	12,309
198	Lake Como Borough	Monmouth	$60,237	$82,500	1,710	832
199	Liberty Township	Warren	$60,092	$115,139	2,678	1,035
200	West Orange Township	Essex	$60,079	$127,931	48,399	17,344
201	Haddon Heights Borough	Camden	$59,798	$117,556	7,484	3,132
202	Teaneck Township	Bergen	$59,414	$130,080	41,427	13,333
203	Greenwich Township (Warren County)	Warren	$59,351	$168,145	5,480	1,768
204	Medford Lakes Borough	Burlington	$59,215	$139,879	4,263	1,467
205	Califon Borough	Hunterdon	$59,168	$106,875	939	410
206	Jersey City	Hudson	$58,837	$94,080	286,661	130,213
207	Glen Gardner Borough	Hunterdon	$58,673	$79,000	1,610	730
208	Rochelle Park Township	Bergen	$58,444	$110,944	5,790	2,376
209	Pilesgrove Township	Salem	$58,426	$145,685	4,165	1,439
210	Evesham Township	Burlington	$58,353	$111,893	47,200	19,097
211	Ocean Township	Monmouth	$58,326	$112,614	27,733	10,580
212	Little Falls Township	Passaic	$58,184	$119,196	14,229	5,654
213	East Brunswick Township	Middlesex	$58,162	$138,003	49,462	17,110
214	Bloomingdale Borough	Passaic	$57,902	$125,865	7,726	2,949
215	Parsippany-Troy Hills Township	Morris	$57,762	$109,308	55,970	22,159
216	Mansfield Township (Burlington County)	Burlington	$57,673	$106,853	8,882	3,591
217	Stow Creek Township	Cumberland	$57,429	$99,821	1,244	459
218	Fairfield Township (Essex County)	Essex	$57,256	$110,703	7,723	2,951
219	Lawrence Township (Mercer County)	Mercer	$57,238	$121,792	32,636	11,902
220	Lawrence Township	Cumberland	$57,238	$121,792	32,636	11,902
221	Freehold Township	Monmouth	$57,225	$130,911	35,548	12,880
222	Rutherford Borough	Bergen	$57,150	$128,576	18,754	6,755
223	Riverdale Borough	Morris	$57,148	$103,214	4,081	1,904
224	Clark Township	Union	$56,980	$120,882	15,415	5,902
225	Lumberton Township	Burlington	$56,953	$112,540	12,786	4,812
226	Wildwood Crest Borough	Cape May	$56,725	$64,363	3,104	1,875
227	West Milford Township	Passaic	$56,631	$120,465	24,797	9,715
228	Mount Olive Township	Morris	$56,580	$107,632	28,876	11,113
229	Point Pleasant Borough	Ocean	$56,476	$106,203	19,024	7,773
230	Aberdeen Township	Monmouth	$56,383	$118,085	19,234	8,075
231	South Harrison Township	Gloucester	$56,367	$126,667	3,391	1,128
232	North Haledon Borough	Passaic	$56,231	$128,472	8,801	2,980
233	Raritan Borough	Somerset	$56,129	$99,928	8,301	3,262
234	Franklin Township (Somerset County)	Somerset	$56,116	$120,501	68,579	25,814
235	Pine Beach Borough	Ocean	$56,096	$116,518	2,402	919
236	East Greenwich Township	Gloucester	$55,848	$135,266	11,728	4,116
237	Byram Township	Sussex	$55,847	$131,792	8,059	2,962
238	Nutley Township	Essex	$55,846	$111,979	29,823	11,702
239	Woolwich Township	Gloucester	$55,785	$152,695	12,703	4,023
240	Old Bridge Township	Middlesex	$55,775	$105,826	67,733	25,552
241	Paramus Borough	Bergen	$55,747	$136,824	26,582	8,410
242	Garwood Borough	Union	$55,478	$107,823	4,542	1,956
243	Westampton Township	Burlington	$55,395	$116,724	9,104	3,299
244	Barnegat Light Borough	Ocean	$55,214	$93,958	435	201
245	Northvale Borough	Bergen	$54,831	$120,278	4,769	1,626
246	Lebanon Township	Hunterdon	$54,817	$131,030	6,209	2,375
247	Jefferson Township	Morris	$54,765	$120,060	20,555	8,051
248	Mantua Township	Gloucester	$54,658	$108,958	15,283	5,653
249	Sussex Borough	Sussex	$54,646	$65,481	1,918	875
250	Sandyston Township	Sussex	$54,513	$101,981	2,036	826
251	Riverton Borough	Burlington	$54,499	$122,069	2,764	1,028
252	Frelinghuysen Township	Warren	$54,482	$117,727	2,191	756
253	Collingswood Borough	Camden	$54,456	$78,909	14,135	6,698
254	Netcong Borough	Morris	$54,439	$83,125	3,484	1,870
255	Alloway Township	Salem	$54,154	$113,667	3,293	1,208
256	Haddon Township	Camden	$54,125	$112,352	15,331	6,842
257	Franklin Township (Warren County)	Warren	$54,117	$121,193	2,985	1,079
258	Roxbury Township	Morris	$54,058	$123,527	23,101	8,163
259	Bradley Beach Borough	Monmouth	$53,872	$89,967	4,268	1,923
260	Matawan Borough	Monmouth	$53,663	$125,040	9,546	3,775
261	Union Township (Hunterdon County)	Hunterdon	$53,464	$118,370	6,402	2,244
262	Asbury Park City	Monmouth	$53,385	$63,461	15,245	7,477
263	Plumsted Township	Ocean	$53,203	$86,906	8,211	3,350
264	Bordentown Township	Burlington	$53,125	$113,040	11,836	4,467
265	Vernon Township	Sussex	$53,012	$110,862	22,440	8,937
266	Highland Park Borough	Middlesex	$52,912	$93,927	14,996	6,547
267	Allentown Borough	Monmouth	$52,881	$113,438	1,817	691
268	Shamong Township	Burlington	$52,777	$118,930	6,461	2,231
269	Cinnaminson Township	Burlington	$52,687	$127,516	17,069	6,113
270	Blairstown Township	Warren	$52,570	$132,543	5,718	2,116
271	Hope Township	Warren	$52,472	$104,009	1,893	789
272	Hardyston Township	Sussex	$52,405	$115,579	8,160	3,467
273	Butler Borough	Morris	$52,221	$108,378	8,045	3,482
274	Union Beach Borough	Monmouth	$52,199	$124,828	5,751	1,987
275	Hopatcong Borough	Sussex	$52,157	$107,670	14,411	5,756
276	Dumont Borough	Bergen	$52,142	$116,708	18,014	6,593
277	Washington Township (Warren County)	Warren	$52,090	$111,815	6,522	2,533
278	New Milford Borough	Bergen	$51,889	$107,976	16,888	6,170
279	Hawthorne Borough	Passaic	$51,860	$105,168	19,456	7,585
280	Rockaway Borough	Morris	$51,856	$93,750	6,589	2,641
281	West Cape May Borough	Cape May	$51,818	$87,212	927	421
282	Northfield City	Atlantic	$51,741	$103,977	8,432	3,159
283	Saddle Brook Township	Bergen	$51,631	$123,238	14,320	5,321
284	Oxford Township	Warren	$51,476	$100,399	2,555	1,053
285	Pompton Lakes Borough	Passaic	$51,422	$113,781	11,052	4,227
286	Elk Township	Gloucester	$51,417	$145,431	4,408	1,436
287	Chesterfield Township	Burlington	$51,398	$188,611	9,144	2,338
	New Jersey	–	$51,272	$96,346	9,261,699	3,516,978
288	Somerville Borough	Somerset	$51,250	$102,423	12,467	5,135
289	Upper Township	Cape May	$51,189	$106,822	12,562	5,173
290	Frenchtown Borough	Hunterdon	$50,908	$99,018	1,639	637
291	Frankford Township	Sussex	$50,569	$111,392	5,315	1,969
292	Holland Township	Hunterdon	$50,540	$125,038	5,194	1,901
293	Hampton Borough	Hunterdon	$50,459	$74,833	1,064	486
294	Lincoln Park Borough	Morris	$50,438	$112,056	10,884	4,117
295	Milltown Borough	Middlesex	$50,395	$125,043	7,017	2,496
296	Florence Township	Burlington	$50,337	$102,435	12,748	4,900
297	Howell Township	Monmouth	$50,262	$128,177	53,479	18,630
298	Totowa Borough	Passaic	$50,260	$112,097	10,975	3,781
299	Southampton Township	Burlington	$50,185	$82,786	10,308	4,432
300	East Windsor Township	Mercer	$50,075	$108,060	29,784	11,178
301	Helmetta Borough	Middlesex	$50,000	$104,500	2,302	968
302	Edison Township	Middlesex	$49,917	$120,698	107,352	36,642
303	Tabernacle Township	Burlington	$49,893	$104,946	6,797	2,652
304	Maywood Borough	Bergen	$49,808	$119,057	10,040	3,702
305	Hasbrouck Heights Borough	Bergen	$49,758	$114,219	12,080	4,283
306	Barrington Borough	Camden	$49,735	$82,070	7,022	3,377
307	Kenilworth Borough	Union	$49,611	$97,600	8,345	2,802
308	Toms River Township	Ocean	$49,572	$92,815	98,341	36,952
309	Stafford Township	Ocean	$49,451	$102,500	28,917	11,502
310	Washington Township (Gloucester County)	Gloucester	$49,447	$106,640	48,830	18,000
311	Cliffside Park Borough	Bergen	$49,434	$96,734	25,546	10,526
312	Woodbury Heights Borough	Gloucester	$49,355	$112,222	3,092	1,106
313	Lafayette Township	Sussex	$49,332	$115,313	2,426	853
314	North Brunswick Township	Middlesex	$49,317	$110,285	43,708	15,681
315	West Long Branch Borough	Monmouth	$49,295	$114,036	8,547	2,747
316	Hazlet Township	Monmouth	$49,209	$118,360	20,249	7,451
317	Mount Arlington Borough	Morris	$49,096	$95,431	5,863	2,422
318	Lyndhurst Township	Bergen	$49,048	$104,338	22,332	9,055
319	Folsom Borough	Atlantic	$49,023	$112,989	1,761	641
320	Weymouth Township	Atlantic	$49,012	$65,799	2,640	1,373
321	Middlesex Borough	Middlesex	$48,793	$101,868	14,525	5,580
322	Bordentown City	Burlington	$48,757	$88,153	3,989	1,849
323	Eastampton Township	Burlington	$48,756	$102,632	6,215	2,675
324	Delran Township	Burlington	$48,702	$101,743	17,794	6,822
325	Hamburg Borough	Sussex	$48,661	$78,586	3,274	1,457
326	East Rutherford Borough	Bergen	$48,616	$92,536	10,020	4,258
327	Englishtown Borough	Monmouth	$48,523	$101,750	2,129	725
328	North Arlington Borough	Bergen	$48,499	$96,869	16,352	6,634
329	Hampton Township	Sussex	$48,363	$102,394	4,906	1,995
330	Ventnor City	Atlantic	$48,344	$71,321	9,285	4,348
331	Lopatcong Township	Warren	$48,223	$91,954	8,981	3,987
332	South Plainfield Borough	Middlesex	$48,206	$123,417	24,273	8,150
333	Union Township (Union County)	Union	$48,077	$113,528	59,956	20,887
334	Bogota Borough	Bergen	$48,011	$113,260	8,940	3,199
335	Montague Township	Sussex	$48,007	$102,727	3,800	1,488
336	Stillwater Township	Sussex	$47,951	$116,582	4,015	1,586
337	Knowlton Township	Warren	$47,872	$101,813	2,909	1,091
338	Independence Township	Warren	$47,858	$92,536	5,479	2,359
339	Beachwood Borough	Ocean	$47,686	$99,099	10,933	3,935
340	Hardwick Township	Warren	$47,675	$109,375	1,549	557
341	Boonton Town	Morris	$47,574	$96,500	8,781	3,414
342	Wanaque Borough	Passaic	$47,518	$108,650	11,217	4,277
343	High Bridge Borough	Hunterdon	$47,457	$106,111	3,564	1,436
344	Estell Manor City	Atlantic	$47,253	$114,091	1,729	598
345	Lacey Township	Ocean	$47,219	$96,525	28,879	11,051
346	Bloomfield Township	Essex	$47,111	$92,233	52,638	20,590
347	Stanhope Borough	Sussex	$47,073	$125,938	3,533	1,266
348	Brick Township	Ocean	$47,054	$81,232	75,646	31,619
349	Mine Hill Township	Morris	$47,030	$110,208	3,990	1,396
350	Woodstown Borough	Salem	$46,756	$86,528	3,680	1,523
351	Neptune Township	Monmouth	$46,737	$89,386	28,115	11,453
352	Ogdensburg Borough	Sussex	$46,674	$107,569	2,215	827
353	Carlstadt Borough	Bergen	$46,601	$89,669	6,341	2,586
354	Greenwich Township (Cumberland County)	Cumberland	$46,598	$95,875	683	271
355	Flemington Borough	Hunterdon	$46,593	$85,306	4,864	1,898
356	Berkeley Township	Ocean	$46,534	$63,200	43,846	21,387
357	South Amboy City	Middlesex	$46,481	$94,776	9,336	4,031
358	Logan Township	Gloucester	$46,375	$109,566	6,008	2,141
359	Eagleswood Township	Ocean	$46,330	$93,438	1,653	601
360	Eatontown Borough	Monmouth	$46,275	$88,393	13,522	5,778
361	Spotswood Borough	Middlesex	$46,259	$100,781	8,136	3,186
362	Little Egg Harbor Township	Ocean	$46,146	$84,325	20,901	8,796
363	Hightstown Borough	Mercer	$46,044	$102,917	5,864	2,050
364	Woodland Park Borough	Passaic	$46,030	$90,323	13,291	5,294
365	Oldmans Township	Salem	$45,909	$107,222	1,774	594
366	Jackson Township	Ocean	$45,837	$107,909	58,793	21,033
367	Pohatcong Township	Warren	$45,657	$98,264	3,252	1,389
368	Ridgefield Borough	Bergen	$45,604	$105,609	11,465	4,028
369	Audubon Borough	Camden	$45,562	$103,379	8,695	3,329
370	Monroe Township (Gloucester County)	Gloucester	$45,532	$98,945	37,231	13,501
371	Milford Borough	Hunterdon	$45,514	$89,196	1,244	525
372	Millville City	Cumberland	$45,387	$65,279	27,523	11,646
373	Millstone Borough	Somerset	$45,353	$133,929	584	184
374	Woodbridge Township	Middlesex	$45,331	$97,783	103,244	37,510
375	Berlin Borough	Camden	$45,214	$98,706	7,489	2,835
376	Neptune City Borough	Monmouth	$45,178	$82,009	4,619	2,219
377	West Deptford Township	Gloucester	$45,038	$84,669	22,200	9,054
378	Hamilton Township (Mercer County)	Mercer	$44,953	$84,584	91,544	37,827
379	Dennis Township	Cape May	$44,950	$110,300	6,283	2,360
380	Roselle Park Borough	Union	$44,845	$97,769	13,964	5,100
381	Mullica Township	Atlantic	$44,643	$87,679	5,820	2,151
382	Wharton Borough	Morris	$44,620	$91,557	7,217	2,779
383	Clifton City	Passaic	$44,606	$95,147	88,722	34,615
384	Palmyra Borough	Burlington	$44,593	$84,866	7,437	3,200
385	Bergenfield Borough	Bergen	$44,580	$121,738	28,223	9,306
386	Oaklyn Borough	Camden	$44,563	$81,012	3,937	1,729
387	Woodland Township	Burlington	$44,525	$148,125	1,481	438
388	Hackensack City	Bergen	$44,428	$79,133	45,758	19,770
389	Washington Township (Burlington County)	Burlington	$44,340	$76,806	562	243
390	Manville Borough	Somerset	$44,248	$85,925	10,892	4,391
391	Pitman Borough	Gloucester	$44,092	$91,566	8,805	3,670
392	Stratford Borough	Camden	$44,077	$89,200	6,962	2,612
393	Waterford Township	Camden	$43,964	$99,799	10,411	3,825
394	Tuckerton Borough	Ocean	$43,962	$80,957	3,582	1,539
395	Elsinboro Township	Salem	$43,759	$87,250	871	351
396	Keyport Borough	Monmouth	$43,755	$75,709	7,188	3,364
397	Wildwood City	Cape May	$43,732	$49,131	5,164	2,461
398	Harrison Town	Hudson	$43,699	$72,773	19,217	8,531
399	Hammonton Town	Atlantic	$43,688	$79,747	14,732	5,751
400	Wantage Township	Sussex	$43,669	$100,914	10,858	4,065
401	Belvidere Town	Warren	$43,387	$95,861	2,532	1,144
402	Bayonne City	Hudson	$43,387	$79,363	69,527	28,393
403	Middle Township	Cape May	$43,329	$79,990	20,340	8,801
404	Rahway City	Union	$43,300	$86,557	29,664	12,079
405	Sayreville Borough	Middlesex	$43,127	$95,250	45,136	16,851
406	Newfield Borough	Gloucester	$43,118	$103,438	1,830	637
407	Branchville Borough	Sussex	$43,019	$118,125	708	297
408	Guttenberg Town	Hudson	$43,016	$76,187	11,765	4,973
409	Fieldsboro Borough	Burlington	$42,980	$82,333	732	258
410	Ocean Gate Borough	Ocean	$42,958	$67,788	1,682	743
411	Lawnside Borough	Camden	$42,951	$74,250	3,059	1,146
412	Farmingdale Borough	Monmouth	$42,735	$93,523	1,326	541
413	Ridgefield Park Village	Bergen	$42,695	$94,047	13,161	5,070
414	Palisades Park Borough	Bergen	$42,538	$93,250	20,231	7,119
415	Burlington Township	Burlington	$42,513	$98,097	23,879	8,731
416	Bound Brook Borough	Somerset	$42,456	$78,776	11,906	4,567
417	Little Ferry Borough	Bergen	$42,435	$72,722	10,954	4,334
418	Bass River Township	Burlington	$42,242	$92,500	897	354
419	Wallington Borough	Bergen	$42,203	$79,270	11,838	4,994
420	Lower Township	Cape May	$42,108	$74,944	22,123	10,043
421	Laurel Springs Borough	Camden	$42,094	$113,500	2,004	680
422	Shrewsbury Township	Monmouth	$42,066	$77,656	1,269	519
423	Delanco Township	Burlington	$42,034	$72,400	4,785	2,128
424	Roosevelt Borough	Monmouth	$41,976	$101,339	1,037	335
425	Gibbsboro Borough	Camden	$41,960	$93,103	2,278	782
426	Quinton Township	Salem	$41,826	$80,000	2,588	1,074
	United States of America	–	$41,804	$74,755	333,287,550	129,870,930
427	Deptford Township	Gloucester	$41,755	$90,995	31,956	11,753
428	Greenwich Township (Gloucester County)	Gloucester	$41,524	$90,345	4,921	1,958
429	Piscataway Township	Middlesex	$41,467	$122,965	60,447	17,160
430	Somerdale Borough	Camden	$41,249	$83,778	5,524	2,268
431	Merchantville Borough	Camden	$41,244	$72,375	3,800	1,473
432	Pine Hill Borough	Camden	$41,194	$69,176	10,698	4,439
433	Manchester Township	Ocean	$41,104	$53,442	45,206	24,035
434	Absecon City	Atlantic	$41,063	$73,141	9,086	3,564
435	Harmony Township	Warren	$40,999	$91,384	2,506	931
436	Lodi Borough	Bergen	$40,888	$80,044	25,969	9,279
437	Bloomsbury Borough	Hunterdon	$40,879	$85,446	860	385
438	Barnegat Township	Ocean	$40,804	$82,927	24,295	9,766
439	Elmer Borough	Salem	$40,778	$91,116	1,268	437
440	Franklin Borough	Sussex	$40,764	$87,558	4,933	2,209
441	Lower Alloways Creek Township	Salem	$40,454	$73,958	1,668	675
442	Winfield Township	Union	$40,264	$61,250	1,518	757
443	Hackettstown Town	Warren	$40,183	$95,174	10,111	3,698
444	South River Borough	Middlesex	$40,055	$95,981	16,081	5,555
445	Upper Pittsgrove Township	Salem	$40,015	$80,952	3,428	1,094
446	Egg Harbor Township	Atlantic	$39,983	$92,509	47,488	16,635
447	Jamesburg Borough	Middlesex	$39,959	$112,813	5,783	2,079
448	Alpha Borough	Warren	$39,943	$78,500	2,223	956
449	Hopewell Township (Cumberland County)	Cumberland	$39,920	$90,076	4,387	1,528
450	South Bound Brook Borough	Somerset	$39,845	$92,625	4,838	1,951
451	Mansfield Township (Warren County)	Warren	$39,812	$93,472	7,775	2,933
452	Somers Point City	Atlantic	$39,729	$68,262	10,482	4,650
453	Woodbury City	Gloucester	$39,725	$75,425	9,981	4,110
454	South Hackensack Township	Bergen	$39,716	$87,813	2,820	918
455	Hamilton Township (Atlantic County)	Atlantic	$39,503	$86,303	27,670	10,708
456	Franklin Township (Gloucester County)	Gloucester	$39,481	$94,926	16,418	5,689
457	Newton Town	Sussex	$39,363	$72,240	8,370	3,516
458	White Township	Warren	$39,258	$56,731	4,635	2,234
459	North Bergen Township	Hudson	$39,248	$76,053	62,066	23,959
460	Mount Ephraim Borough	Camden	$39,078	$81,800	4,638	1,904
461	Pennsville Township	Salem	$39,038	$74,429	12,706	5,190
462	Long Branch City	Monmouth	$39,010	$72,234	31,932	12,813
463	Belleville Township	Essex	$39,009	$85,812	37,787	13,711
464	West Wildwood Borough	Cape May	$38,744	$58,750	427	228
465	Pemberton Borough	Burlington	$38,637	$85,701	1,338	539
466	Ewing Township	Mercer	$38,556	$86,751	36,140	13,062
467	Hillside Township	Union	$38,490	$89,804	22,262	7,248
468	Gloucester Township	Camden	$38,320	$88,743	65,979	24,016
469	Galloway Township	Atlantic	$38,266	$86,799	37,697	13,570
470	Seaside Heights Borough	Ocean	$38,232	$51,364	2,027	1,046
471	Magnolia Borough	Camden	$38,225	$74,295	4,342	1,784
472	Berlin Township	Camden	$38,124	$87,593	5,881	2,266
473	Maple Shade Township	Burlington	$38,109	$71,748	19,885	8,680
474	West New York Town	Hudson	$37,947	$70,141	52,438	20,608
475	Pittsgrove Township	Salem	$37,595	$76,012	8,799	3,287
476	Clayton Borough	Gloucester	$37,530	$91,711	8,801	3,188
477	Buena Borough	Atlantic	$37,499	$85,916	4,504	1,551
478	Pemberton Township	Burlington	$37,482	$76,516	26,926	9,996
479	Haledon Borough	Passaic	$37,366	$98,642	8,945	3,192
480	Bellmawr Borough	Camden	$37,352	$71,935	11,677	4,834
481	Westville Borough	Gloucester	$37,296	$63,000	4,276	1,910
482	Andover Borough	Sussex	$37,282	$78,750	747	279
483	Downe Township	Cumberland	$37,254	$60,982	1,415	593
484	Roselle Borough	Union	$37,208	$75,264	22,500	8,223
485	National Park Borough	Gloucester	$37,065	$83,125	3,028	1,049
486	Dunellen Borough	Middlesex	$36,989	$86,532	7,598	2,446
487	Runnemede Borough	Camden	$36,974	$85,700	8,307	3,164
488	Willingboro Township	Burlington	$36,940	$88,516	31,846	10,691
489	Shiloh Borough	Cumberland	$36,910	$87,917	305	115
490	Chesilhurst Borough	Camden	$36,865	$85,104	1,384	487
491	Winslow Township	Camden	$36,805	$87,179	39,854	14,569
492	Swedesboro Borough	Gloucester	$36,714	$92,218	2,706	909
493	Deerfield Township	Cumberland	$36,579	$78,021	3,129	1,074
494	Mount Holly Township	Burlington	$36,531	$81,605	9,943	3,596
495	Elmwood Park Borough	Bergen	$36,519	$84,578	21,261	7,220
496	Buena Vista Township	Atlantic	$36,497	$76,327	7,068	2,796
497	Paulsboro Borough	Gloucester	$36,377	$58,271	6,195	2,467
498	Linden City	Union	$36,207	$86,801	43,478	15,219
499	Fairview Borough	Bergen	$35,932	$59,359	14,935	5,823
500	Hi-Nella Borough	Camden	$35,684	$64,423	883	424
501	Edgewater Park Township	Burlington	$35,641	$80,139	8,922	3,384
502	Kearny Town	Hudson	$35,585	$81,307	41,157	14,703
503	Carneys Point Township	Salem	$35,367	$71,625	8,606	3,654
504	North Plainfield Borough	Somerset	$35,195	$81,219	22,695	8,077
505	Dover Town	Morris	$35,182	$67,987	18,426	6,128
506	Keansburg Borough	Monmouth	$34,983	$80,144	9,761	3,853
507	Beverly City	Burlington	$34,955	$90,069	2,502	833
508	Clementon Borough	Camden	$34,622	$62,917	5,312	2,268
509	Washington Borough	Warren	$34,521	$67,761	7,240	2,991
510	Garfield City	Bergen	$34,418	$72,026	32,472	11,544
511	Glassboro Borough	Gloucester	$34,417	$78,518	23,014	7,521
512	North Hanover Township	Burlington	$34,274	$81,427	7,943	2,779
513	Upper Deerfield Township	Cumberland	$34,255	$74,823	7,698	2,828
514	Riverside Township	Burlington	$34,040	$69,494	8,008	2,977
515	Audubon Park Borough	Camden	$33,766	$51,387	1,031	543
516	Phillipsburg Town	Warren	$33,659	$64,130	15,206	6,602
517	Pennsauken Township	Camden	$33,596	$80,248	36,984	12,822
518	Moonachie Borough	Bergen	$33,568	$90,263	3,093	950
519	Freehold Borough	Monmouth	$33,223	$71,205	12,498	4,388
520	Wrightstown Borough	Burlington	$33,177	$53,125	467	198
521	Corbin City	Atlantic	$32,650	$84,500	697	232
522	Maurice River Township	Cumberland	$32,343	$70,109	6,179	1,144
523	Vineland City	Cumberland	$32,195	$63,468	60,796	60,796
524	Commercial Township	Cumberland	$32,136	$55,254	4,702	1,762
525	Brooklawn Borough	Camden	$32,049	$58,288	1,894	853
526	Carteret Borough	Middlesex	$31,861	$79,049	25,161	8,153
527	South Toms River Borough	Ocean	$31,800	$96,688	3,662	1,098
528	Mannington Township	Salem	$31,539	$100,714	1,868	442
529	Lakehurst Borough	Ocean	$31,394	$78,525	2,653	989
530	Teterboro Borough	Bergen	$29,955	–	91	27
531	Gloucester City	Camden	$29,122	$71,756	11,435	4,061
532	Plainfield City	Union	$28,788	$70,712	54,358	16,459
533	Lindenwold Borough	Camden	$28,628	$53,645	21,337	9,027
534	Egg Harbor City	Atlantic	$28,573	$51,675	4,376	1,859
535	East Orange City	Essex	$28,372	$43,527	68,445	27,653
536	City of Orange Township	Essex	$27,556	$50,607	33,922	12,393
537	Elizabeth City	Union	$27,460	$64,113	134,274	47,280
538	Irvington Township	Essex	$27,378	$57,293	60,268	22,178
539	East Newark Borough	Hudson	$27,315	$63,594	2,718	846
540	Union City	Hudson	$26,775	$58,020	65,365	25,162
541	Fairfield Township (Cumberland County)	Cumberland	$26,083	$60,278	5,538	1,584
542	Perth Amboy City	Middlesex	$25,853	$56,239	55,226	18,409
543	Trenton City	Mercer	$25,633	$52,508	89,658	30,789
544	Prospect Park Borough	Passaic	$25,501	$54,271	6,299	1,892
545	Victory Gardens Borough	Morris	$25,474	$55,000	1,761	670
546	Newark City	Essex	$25,171	$49,688	305,339	112,713
547	Woodbine Borough	Cape May	$25,040	$41,167	2,264	858
548	Pleasantville City	Atlantic	$24,198	$48,704	20,562	6,724
549	Atlantic City	Atlantic	$24,172	$35,188	38,487	16,473
550	New Brunswick City	Middlesex	$24,057	$57,138	55,718	15,626
551	Lakewood Township	Ocean	$23,621	$63,729	139,511	31,148
552	Woodlynne Borough	Camden	$23,156	$68,125	2,904	834
553	Passaic City	Passaic	$23,044	$51,551	69,121	20,280
554	Paterson City	Passaic	$22,794	$47,373	156,639	50,054
555	Salem City	Salem	$21,330	$35,143	5,285	2,172
556	Camden City	Camden	$17,949	$37,075	70,998	24,224
557	New Hanover Township	Burlington	$17,304	$104,063	7,192	575
558	Bridgeton City	Cumberland	$17,253	$44,440	26,895	6,918
559	Penns Grove Borough	Salem	$15,903	$29,821	4,841	1,604

== New Jersey zip codes ranked by per capita income ==
This is a list of all zip codes in New Jersey ranked by per capita income based on data from the 2020 United States census and 2018-2022 American Community Survey. ZIP Code Tabulation Areas (ZCTAs) were utilized.

Rank	Zip Code	Area Name	Per capita income	Median household income	Population	Households
1	07078	Short Hills	$154,251	$250,000+	14,287	4,513
2	07311	Jersey City	$132,774	$175,795	1,785	1,163
3	07760	Rumson, Sea Bright, Locust	$130,326	$201,534	9,613	3,471
4	07423	Ho-Ho-Kus	$127,820	$250,000+	4,234	1,409
5	07620	Alpine	$124,312	$228,194	1,449	515
6	08738	Mantoloking	$124,179	$190,625	1,411	595
7	08247	Stone Harbor	$119,902	$136,250	977	532
8	07931	Far Hills	$119,781	$155,703	3,399	1,237
9	07750	Monmouth Beach	$116,528	$144,792	3,199	1,520
10	08403	Longport, Seaview Harbor	$114,187	$108,750	946	495
11	07021	Essex Fells	$113,678	$247,000	2,290	726
12	07704	Fair Haven	$113,189	$229,643	6,221	2,106
13	08750	Sea Girt	$112,104	$154,130	3,612	1,540
14	08202	Avalon	$110,650	$152,670	1,625	816
15	07928	Chatham Borough, Chatham Township	$110,232	$223,547	19,559	6,635
16	07934	Gladstone	$108,822	$211,250	1,575	629
17	07458	Saddle River	$108,337	$233,669	11,676	3,924
18	07302	Jersey City	$106,592	$165,235	53,237	26,529
19	07945	Mendham Borough, Mendham Township	$106,098	$234,150	9,698	3,390
20	07310	Jersey City	$104,789	$191,912	14,371	7,122
21	07924	Bernardsville	$104,501	$218,971	7,746	2,630
22	07046	Mountain Lakes	$104,161	$250,000+	4,499	1,430
23	07901	Summit	$103,877	$170,275	24,281	8,727
24	07739	Little Silver	$102,990	$216,974	6,104	2,248
25	07417	Franklin Lakes	$102,802	$204,833	11,010	3,770
26	07030	Hoboken	$102,492	$168,137	58,754	27,879
27	07632	Englewood Cliffs	$102,113	$213,261	5,347	1,860
28	08558	Skillman	$101,748	$233,865	7,515	2,643
29	07970	Mount Freedom	$100,942	–	257	71
30	07028	Glen Ridge	$100,754	$239,192	7,970	2,540
31	07059	Warren	$99,925	$196,122	16,208	5,554
32	07043	Upper Montclair	$98,370	$231,214	13,425	4,284
33	07670	Tenafly	$97,437	$207,652	15,299	5,076
34	07090	Westfield	$96,642	$202,450	30,852	10,439
35	07920	Basking Ridge	$96,239	$174,754	28,460	10,400
36	08559	Stockton	$95,581	$165,354	4,902	2,045
37	07450	Ridgewood	$93,774	$211,154	26,054	8,703
38	08836	Martinsville	$93,600	$214,375	4,023	1,278
39	07977	Peapack	$93,594	–	689	213
40	07020	Edgewater	$92,821	$136,806	14,394	7,024
41	08550	Princeton Junction	$92,716	$196,053	20,954	7,658
42	08008	Beach Haven, Harvey Cedars, Long Beach, Ship Bottom, Surf City	$92,249	$110,568	6,995	3,421
43	07401	Allendale	$92,202	$163,875	6,817	2,271
44	07627	Demarest	$91,523	$165,119	4,930	1,690
45	07481	Wyckoff	$91,373	$184,458	16,802	5,837
46	07041	Millburn	$91,060	$199,602	7,412	2,589
47	08057	Moorestown	$90,682	$159,596	20,942	7,633
48	07722	Colts Neck	$90,436	$185,417	10,014	3,546
49	07717	Avon-by-the-Sea	$90,056	$106,563	1,792	868
50	08064	New Lisbon	$89,943	–	60	44
51	07711	Allenhurst	$89,750	$125,750	1,811	637
52	07922	Berkeley Heights	$89,492	$195,162	12,078	4,153
53	07640	Harrington Park	$89,088	$183,138	4,826	1,737
54	07039	Livingston	$88,882	$202,619	31,091	10,378
55	08535	Perrineville	$88,711	$191,184	4,851	1,646
56	07733	Holmdel	$88,584	$171,071	17,130	6,026
57	08502	Belle Mead	$88,307	$229,272	11,603	3,827
58	07960	Morristown, Harding Township	$86,498	$146,024	46,560	18,499
59	08033	Haddonfield	$84,802	$148,542	17,110	6,466
60	08540	Princeton	$84,069	$161,018	48,513	17,578
61	07921	Bedminster	$83,805	$125,893	7,573	3,845
62	07930	Chester	$82,856	$208,750	8,138	2,758
63	08736	Manasquan	$82,809	$159,533	13,234	5,266
64	08553	Rocky Hill	$82,593	$126,250	794	295
65	07946	Millington	$82,009	$203,393	2,991	971
66	07974	New Providence	$81,872	$170,386	12,911	4,615
67	07042	Montclair	$81,771	$130,329	26,945	10,925
68	07762	Spring Lake	$81,691	$111,366	8,196	4,018
69	08730	Brielle	$81,236	$160,845	4,957	1,846
70	07677	Woodcliff Lake	$81,156	$227,500	6,096	2,120
71	07076	Scotch Plains	$80,725	$179,531	24,727	8,823
72	07641	Haworth	$80,677	$215,972	3,342	1,069
73	07044	Verona	$80,102	$153,236	14,438	5,821
74	07853	Long Valley	$79,748	$196,011	12,548	4,266
75	07082	Towaco	$79,712	$153,977	5,612	1,968
76	08402	Margate City	$79,711	$112,661	5,331	2,584
77	07738	Lincroft	$79,608	$186,875	6,793	2,324
78	07092	Mountainside	$79,245	$162,531	6,991	2,537
79	07045	Montville	$78,935	$163,047	10,240	3,720
80	08542	Princeton	$78,907	$157,336	2,595	1,139
81	08833	Lebanon	$78,841	$155,714	9,057	3,606
82	07746	Marlboro	$78,016	$179,102	18,230	5,984
83	07079	South Orange	$77,719	$173,012	18,648	5,863
84	08534	Pennington	$76,875	$179,516	12,990	4,688
85	08321	Fortescue	$76,659	$39,583	95	57
86	08525	Hopewell	$76,595	$150,278	4,554	1,928
87	07086	Weehawken	$76,584	$120,395	16,790	7,862
88	07006	Caldwell	$76,101	$144,142	26,449	9,997
89	08889	White House Station	$75,916	$134,352	10,383	4,212
90	07701	Red Bank	$75,914	$109,911	25,253	11,091
91	07976	New Vernon	$75,472	–	355	158
92	07723	Deal	$75,414	$73,796	728	296
93	07649	Oradell	$75,156	$196,023	8,208	2,733
94	07751	Morganville	$75,054	$168,351	21,311	7,231
95	07040	Maplewood	$74,936	$165,681	25,384	8,401
96	07932	Florham Park	$74,763	$140,602	10,941	4,476
97	07645	Montvale	$74,722	$175,179	8,413	3,066
98	07933	Gillette	$74,677	$129,141	2,661	996
99	08530	Lambertville	$74,599	$120,112	8,114	3,330
100	07435	Newfoundland	$74,350	$136,600	2,453	1,030
101	07452	Glen Rock	$74,312	$202,586	12,086	3,652
102	08867	Pittstown	$73,893	$188,429	5,819	2,035
103	08221	Linwood	$73,858	$133,487	6,952	2,655
104	07716	Atlantic Highlands	$73,777	$111,611	8,279	3,661
105	07069	Watchung	$73,676	$152,168	6,651	2,324
106	08735	Lavallette	$73,661	$71,709	3,732	2,087
107	07023	Fanwood	$73,487	$177,727	7,723	2,808
108	08853	Neshanic Station	$73,214	$206,020	5,349	1,963
109	07016	Cranford	$72,825	$152,941	23,838	9,164
110	07676	Township of Washington	$72,626	$155,930	9,268	3,362
111	07732	Highlands	$72,384	$87,039	4,740	2,536
112	07830	Califon	$72,262	$168,900	7,748	2,863
113	08752	Seaside Park	$72,201	$78,295	2,333	1,269
114	07675	Westwood, River Vale, Old Tappan	$72,115	$168,662	26,989	9,609
115	07871	Sparta	$71,983	$159,924	21,020	7,675
116	07661	River Edge	$71,926	$150,073	12,022	4,369
117	08732	Island Heights	$71,779	$106,339	1,449	685
118	07981	Whippany	$71,670	$144,573	8,938	3,726
119	07869	Randolph	$71,490	$166,618	26,058	9,086
120	07756	Ocean Grove	$71,408	$72,500	3,246	1,838
121	08824	Kendall Park	$71,309	$178,567	13,297	4,447
122	08243	Sea Isle City	$71,268	$90,703	2,047	1,127
123	07980	Stirling	$71,146	$140,313	2,978	908
124	08055	Medford	$70,550	$152,849	28,651	10,534
125	07624	Closter	$69,763	$181,652	8,555	2,721
126	08510	Clarksburg	$69,697	$190,379	5,520	1,928
127	08844	Hillsborough	$69,468	$153,091	43,077	15,582
128	07950	Morris Plains	$69,383	$146,903	21,738	8,176
129	08212	Cape May Point	$69,308	$82,679	155	85
130	08822	Flemington	$69,253	$136,851	31,330	11,704
131	07068	Roseland	$68,547	$135,451	6,221	2,451
132	08226	Ocean City	$68,244	$98,576	11,260	5,521
133	08248	Strathmere	$68,189	$102,162	121	64
134	07834	Denville	$68,100	$155,356	18,048	6,773
135	07702	Shrewsbury	$67,892	$158,065	4,138	1,388
136	08801	Annandale	$67,827	$151,375	7,665	2,669
137	07626	Cresskill	$67,673	$162,430	9,105	3,060
138	08536	Plainsboro	$67,644	$122,254	20,693	8,395
139	07432	Midland Park	$67,593	$135,909	7,011	2,882
140	08501	Allentown	$67,255	$135,370	6,417	2,460
141	08241	Port Republic	$66,869	$128,611	980	434
142	07642	Hillsdale	$66,663	$175,802	10,125	3,416
143	07757	Oceanport	$66,586	$132,723	6,119	2,459
144	07656	Park Ridge	$66,515	$164,241	9,098	3,203
145	07927	Cedar Knolls	$66,345	$138,304	4,181	1,713
146	08551	Ringoes	$66,245	$148,513	5,746	2,057
147	08827	Hampton	$66,210	$117,128	3,710	1,553
148	07935	Green Village	$65,924	$143,250	472	186
149	08514	Cream Ridge	$65,899	$120,811	5,597	2,071
150	08041	Jobstown	$65,669	$139,000	832	382
151	07726	Englishtown	$65,471	$144,470	44,707	16,290
152	07421	Hewitt	$65,443	$134,179	7,312	2,803
153	07418	Glenwood	$65,373	$178,750	2,473	900
154	08003	Cherry Hill	$65,207	$145,590	31,434	11,485
155	08528	Kingston	$65,120	–	163	151
156	07405	Kinnelon	$65,034	$125,896	17,993	6,810
157	07936	East Hanover	$64,500	$143,365	11,102	3,908
158	08560	Titusville	$64,489	$123,534	3,689	1,426
159	07444	Pompton Plains	$64,465	$111,503	10,941	4,704
160	07836	Flanders	$64,416	$141,646	12,034	4,638
161	07979	Pottersville	$64,199	–	246	82
162	07748	New Monmouth	$64,140	$141,241	28,112	10,117
163	08807	Bridgewater	$63,904	$153,743	38,585	13,811
164	08054	Mount Laurel	$63,783	$111,272	44,929	18,904
165	08203	Brigantine	$63,648	$91,307	7,784	3,748
166	07648	Norwood	$63,518	$156,630	5,657	1,964
167	08043	Voorhees	$63,511	$108,518	30,876	12,002
168	08036	Hainesport	$63,453	$123,018	6,024	2,459
169	08691	Trenton, Hamilton	$63,284	$126,628	16,935	6,857
170	07470	Wayne	$63,140	$147,740	54,557	18,907
171	07081	Springfield	$63,061	$141,759	17,011	6,610
172	07009	Cedar Grove	$62,963	$152,813	13,225	4,888
173	07436	Oakland	$62,885	$162,910	12,731	4,378
174	08820	Edison	$62,875	$157,114	39,565	13,067
175	07024	Fort Lee	$62,822	$101,603	39,781	18,304
176	08840	Metuchen	$62,794	$148,735	18,075	6,221
177	07430	Mahwah	$62,760	$120,618	25,471	9,644
178	07456	Ringwood	$62,750	$141,800	11,692	4,256
179	08831	Jamesburg	$62,709	$108,626	54,229	23,193
180	07719	Wall, Belmar, Lake Como	$62,173	$116,116	21,994	9,034
181	07630	Emerson	$62,132	$141,908	7,281	2,626
182	08512	Cranbury	$62,053	$115,000	12,519	4,812
183	07605	Leonia	$61,944	$110,583	9,291	3,441
184	07075	Wood-Ridge	$61,861	$132,901	9,978	3,851
185	07463	Waldwick	$61,546	$150,861	10,068	3,423
186	07876	Succasunna	$61,133	$162,895	9,527	3,232
187	08742	Point Pleasant, Point Pleasant Beach, Bay Head	$60,849	$107,113	25,193	10,303
188	08876	Somerville	$60,805	$117,153	22,531	8,984
189	07866	Rockaway	$60,494	$123,710	22,383	8,381
190	07094	Secaucus	$60,425	$129,348	21,470	8,607
191	08852	Monmouth Junction	$60,386	$117,411	18,068	7,073
192	07631	Englewood	$60,297	$93,134	29,109	11,317
193	07410	Fair Lawn	$60,255	$141,540	34,948	12,309
194	07058	Pine Brook	$60,102	$152,422	6,052	2,208
195	07052	West Orange	$60,079	$127,931	48,399	17,344
196	08348	Port Elizabeth	$59,538	$215,329	196	66
197	08035	Haddon Heights	$59,525	$115,804	7,570	3,184
198	07666	Teaneck	$59,414	$130,080	41,427	13,333
199	08816	East Brunswick	$59,361	$138,166	49,027	16,822
200	07005	Boonton	$59,223	$120,783	15,106	5,589
201	08826	Glen Gardner	$59,141	$121,513	5,186	2,083
202	07821	Andover	$58,971	$143,477	9,571	3,567
203	07747	Matawan	$58,959	$123,183	32,749	13,137
204	08062	Mullica Hill	$58,927	$153,047	17,907	5,691
205	07662	Rochelle Park	$58,444	$110,944	5,790	2,376
206	08022	Columbus	$58,436	$113,224	9,124	3,636
207	08053	Marlton	$58,353	$111,893	47,200	19,097
208	08515	Chesterfield	$58,181	$189,353	7,857	2,333
209	08741	Pine Beach	$57,995	$127,250	2,798	1,079
210	07403	Bloomingdale	$57,902	$125,865	7,726	2,949
211	07718	Belford	$57,711	$160,154	6,667	2,411
212	07422	Highland Lakes	$57,705	$106,741	5,401	2,149
213	07712	Asbury Park	$57,530	$91,275	39,271	17,324
214	08825	Frenchtown	$57,323	$102,336	4,556	1,916
215	08108	Collingswood	$57,273	$102,941	18,970	8,753
216	07004	Fairfield	$57,256	$110,703	7,723	2,951
217	07070	Rutherford	$57,150	$128,576	18,754	6,755
218	07457	Riverdale	$57,148	$103,214	4,081	1,904
219	08056	Mickleton	$57,100	$141,855	5,427	1,698
220	07833	Delaware	$57,049	$56,875	112	61
221	07066	Clark	$56,980	$120,882	15,415	5,902
222	08048	Lumberton	$56,953	$112,540	12,786	4,812
223	08310	Buena	$56,841	$43,143	979	516
224	07849	Lake Hopatcong	$56,492	$115,670	8,573	3,308
225	08628	Trenton, Ewing	$56,186	$102,600	9,107	4,070
226	08869	Raritan	$56,129	$99,928	8,301	3,262
227	07110	Nutley	$56,063	$112,318	29,695	11,676
228	08034	Cherry Hill	$56,048	$108,458	19,870	7,861
229	07838	Great Meadows	$55,956	$108,810	3,190	1,234
230	08802	Asbury	$55,950	$120,769	4,380	1,478
231	07014	Delawanna	$55,944	$110,625	4,098	1,783
232	07054	Parsippany	$55,917	$105,434	30,392	11,963
233	08887	Three Bridges	$55,879	$106,477	1,411	581
234	07440	Pequannock	$55,847	$154,038	4,620	1,506
235	07652	Paramus	$55,747	$136,824	26,582	8,410
236	08886	Stewartsville	$55,729	$151,500	6,963	2,414
237	08061	Mount Royal	$55,595	$132,102	3,517	1,337
238	07647	Northvale, Rockleigh	$55,500	$122,222	5,336	1,704
239	07027	Garwood	$55,478	$107,823	4,542	1,956
240	07724	Eatontown	$55,295	$96,794	23,739	9,848
241	08006	Barnegat Light	$55,214	$93,958	435	201
242	08019	Chatsworth	$55,189	$150,938	946	355
243	08077	Riverton	$55,132	$129,163	20,456	7,299
244	08810	Dayton	$55,080	$136,130	8,361	2,804
245	08850	Milltown	$55,030	$127,089	8,410	3,015
246	07720	Bradley Beach	$54,695	$89,967	4,151	1,923
247	08648	Trenton, Lawrence	$54,577	$119,151	31,626	11,517
248	08873	Somerset	$54,560	$110,396	55,342	21,244
249	07465	Wanaque	$54,516	$112,366	6,032	2,420
250	08260	Wildwood	$54,460	$63,460	12,680	6,626
251	07832	Columbia	$54,457	$110,250	3,175	1,256
252	07857	Netcong	$54,162	$84,375	3,564	1,894
253	08505	Bordentown	$53,751	$106,986	18,067	7,216
254	08809	Clinton	$53,706	$122,024	6,838	2,334
255	07013	Clifton	$53,654	$113,991	29,725	11,514
256	08726	Branchville	$53,583	$112,277	5,529	2,171
257	08751	Seaside Heights	$53,543	$77,641	3,609	1,877
258	08848	Milford	$53,520	$126,705	8,295	3,043
259	08020	Clarksboro	$53,440	$120,357	2,834	1,100
260	07480	West Milford	$53,271	$111,786	14,884	5,924
261	07438	Oak Ridge	$53,224	$120,242	11,209	4,346
262	08690	Trenton, Hamilton	$53,168	$114,181	19,959	7,962
263	08720	Allenwood	$52,951	$138,636	644	214
264	08904	Highland Park	$52,912	$93,927	14,996	6,547
265	07460	Stockholm	$52,851	$105,787	3,131	1,329
266	07860	Newton	$52,705	$103,876	26,507	10,347
267	07727	Farmingdale	$52,640	$129,857	6,982	2,588
268	07863	Oxford	$52,474	$87,841	3,582	1,506
269	08080	Sewell	$52,259	$114,725	38,215	13,882
270	07852	Ledgewood	$52,207	$92,115	4,095	1,578
271	07424	Little Falls, Woodland Park	$52,186	$106,107	27,474	10,925
272	07628	Dumont	$52,142	$116,708	18,014	6,593
273	08230	Ocean View	$51,904	$109,046	6,139	2,289
274	07646	New Milford	$51,889	$107,976	16,888	6,170
275	07506	Paterson	$51,860	$105,168	19,456	7,585
276	08225	Northfield	$51,741	$103,977	8,432	3,159
277	07843	Hopatcong	$51,671	$105,262	11,102	4,399
278	07728	Freehold	$51,633	$104,417	56,896	20,738
279	07737	Leonardo	$51,632	$126,136	4,181	1,490
280	07663	Saddle Brook	$51,631	$123,238	14,320	5,321
281	07856	Mount Arlington	$51,611	$95,398	4,429	1,915
282	07730	Hazlet	$51,525	$118,034	16,720	6,370
283	07442	Pompton Lakes	$51,422	$113,781	11,052	4,227
284	08533	New Egypt	$51,413	$104,154	6,140	2,346
285	07462	Vernon	$51,349	$92,596	6,712	3,042
	–	New Jersey	$51,272	$96,346	9,261,699	3,516,978
286	08223	Marmora	$51,252	$98,125	4,230	1,893
287	07840	Hackettstown	$51,224	$104,664	32,952	12,790
288	07755	Oakhurst	$51,171	$126,397	6,495	2,027
289	08812	Dunellen	$51,119	$115,481	14,054	4,530
290	08520	Hightstown	$51,112	$115,931	29,296	10,480
291	08857	Old Bridge	$50,986	$102,039	40,430	15,633
292	08085	Swedesboro	$50,965	$134,806	21,364	7,075
293	08002	Cherry Hill	$50,915	$103,031	23,630	9,304
294	08098	Woodstown	$50,826	$111,950	9,475	3,373
295	07034	Lake Hiawatha	$50,524	$95,673	10,064	4,158
296	07035	Lincoln Park	$50,480	$112,579	10,922	4,136
297	08088	Vincentown	$50,298	$102,377	23,988	9,364
298	07512	Totowa	$50,260	$112,097	10,975	3,781
299	08902	New Brunswick	$50,041	$110,195	43,037	15,824
300	07828	Budd Lake	$50,017	$90,120	14,083	5,697
301	08828	Helmetta	$50,000	$104,500	2,302	968
302	08092	West Creek	$49,844	$94,574	3,098	1,184
303	07607	Maywood	$49,808	$119,057	10,040	3,702
304	07604	Hasbrouck Heights	$49,758	$114,219	12,080	4,283
305	07033	Kenilworth	$49,611	$97,600	8,345	2,802
306	07825	Blairstown	$49,575	$120,436	9,723	3,519
307	08753	Toms River	$49,485	$97,153	64,313	24,808
308	07010	Cliffside Park	$49,434	$96,734	25,546	10,526
309	08823	Franklin Park	$49,371	$104,314	9,024	3,508
310	07764	West Long Branch	$49,295	$114,036	8,547	2,747
311	08406	Ventnor City	$49,255	$71,639	9,046	4,307
312	07071	Lyndhurst	$49,048	$104,338	22,332	9,055
313	08001	Alloway	$48,871	$129,375	835	308
314	08846	Middlesex	$48,793	$101,868	14,525	5,580
315	07067	Colonia	$48,773	$129,122	18,581	6,220
316	08050	Manahawkin	$48,675	$103,030	27,097	10,697
317	07874	Stanhope	$48,632	$125,732	8,534	3,124
318	07073	East Rutherford	$48,616	$92,536	10,020	4,258
319	07885	Wharton	$48,610	$102,578	11,673	4,580
320	07083	Union	$48,565	$114,938	56,900	19,742
321	07031	North Arlington	$48,499	$96,869	16,352	6,634
322	07419	Hamburg	$48,376	$112,555	9,927	4,057
323	07846	Johnsonburg	$48,300	–	22	8
324	07080	South Plainfield	$48,232	$123,516	24,256	8,139
325	08097	Woodbury Heights	$48,115	$110,694	3,244	1,164
326	07731	Howell	$48,114	$129,501	39,684	13,289
327	07603	Bogota	$48,011	$113,260	8,940	3,199
328	07827	Montague	$47,958	$103,594	4,117	1,626
329	08830	Iselin	$47,795	$109,646	18,511	6,444
330	08722	Beachwood	$47,686	$99,099	10,933	3,935
331	08731	Forked River	$47,670	$91,815	21,164	8,454
332	08051	Mantua	$47,617	$95,577	12,107	4,406
333	08723	Brick	$47,507	$100,596	32,430	12,891
334	08619	Trenton, Hamilton	$47,495	$97,161	23,446	9,470
335	08829	High Bridge	$47,457	$106,111	3,564	1,436
336	07753	Neptune	$47,433	$85,352	37,243	15,885
337	08086	Thorofare	$47,413	$85,305	8,121	3,556
338	07077	Sewaren	$47,387	$107,887	2,695	1,084
339	08224	New Gretna	$47,180	$134,464	189	57
340	08724	Brick	$47,147	$87,644	40,560	16,199
341	07003	Bloomfield	$47,082	$92,223	52,594	20,573
342	07803	Mine Hill	$47,030	$110,208	3,990	1,396
343	08060	Mount Holly	$46,807	$104,377	25,516	9,658
344	07439	Ogdensburg	$46,674	$107,569	2,215	827
345	07072	Carlstadt	$46,601	$89,669	6,341	2,586
346	08323	Greenwich	$46,598	$95,875	683	271
347	08204	Cape May	$46,580	$76,624	17,392	7,787
348	07878	Mount Tabor	$46,573	$99,684	740	311
349	07461	Sussex	$46,539	$103,389	18,275	6,980
350	07735	Keyport	$46,361	$93,839	19,369	7,895
351	08884	Spotswood	$46,305	$100,365	8,152	3,202
352	08343	Monroeville	$46,230	$134,327	4,882	1,531
353	08734	Lanoka Harbor	$45,982	$115,040	7,715	2,597
354	07822	Augusta	$45,967	$105,882	947	322
355	08527	Jackson	$45,926	$108,039	57,943	20,767
356	08758	Waretown	$45,842	$98,584	7,954	3,221
357	08087	Tuckerton	$45,710	$83,224	25,057	10,560
358	08067	Pedricktown	$45,642	$105,694	1,646	545
359	07657	Ridgefield	$45,604	$105,609	11,465	4,028
360	07850	Landing	$45,600	$95,739	7,266	2,475
361	07851	Layton	$45,464	$100,556	363	160
362	08242	Rio Grande	$45,439	$88,853	3,726	1,754
363	08863	Fords	$45,315	$110,643	12,663	4,438
364	08721	Bayville	$45,269	$103,534	22,217	8,016
365	07882	Washington	$44,980	$89,130	14,670	5,892
366	08837	Edison	$44,874	$98,728	19,544	7,102
367	07204	Roselle Park	$44,845	$97,769	13,964	5,100
368	07204	Roselle Park	$44,845	$97,769	13,964	5,100
369	08620	Trenton, Hamilton	$44,759	$111,141	12,913	4,265
370	07012	Allwood	$44,693	$94,615	14,870	5,389
371	08518	Florence	$44,681	$102,548	5,660	2,123
372	08065	Palmyra	$44,593	$84,866	7,437	3,200
373	07621	Bergenfield	$44,580	$121,738	28,223	9,306
374	08805	Bound Brook	$44,550	$82,200	14,173	5,374
375	07601	Hackensack	$44,428	$79,133	45,758	19,770
376	07416	Franklin	$44,397	$88,557	5,736	2,576
377	08083	Somerdale, Hi-Nella	$44,356	$89,964	9,464	3,843
378	08106	Audubon	$44,311	$93,670	9,726	3,872
379	08094	Williamstown	$44,260	$96,741	41,089	14,910
380	08835	Manville	$44,248	$85,925	10,892	4,391
381	08821	Flagtown	$44,220	$118,333	514	166
382	08084	Stratford	$44,077	$89,200	6,962	2,612
383	08071	Pitman	$44,001	$92,067	9,356	3,825
384	08317	Dorothy	$43,871	$78,992	1,184	569
385	08755	Toms River	$43,854	$76,355	28,586	10,400
386	08879	South Amboy	$43,852	$93,243	22,514	9,209
387	08096	Deptford	$43,830	$91,275	35,573	13,660
388	08037	Hammonton	$43,830	$79,671	23,392	9,163
389	08319	Estell Manor	$43,815	$115,781	1,343	463
390	08210	Cape May Court House	$43,790	$86,366	17,377	7,285
391	08075	Riverside	$43,683	$85,504	30,359	11,810
392	08075	Riverside	$43,683	$85,504	30,359	11,810
393	07065	Rahway	$43,300	$86,557	29,664	12,079
394	08554	Roebling	$43,131	$95,078	4,184	1,533
395	07095	Woodbridge	$43,125	$103,481	20,927	7,812
396	08089	Waterford Works	$43,096	$104,100	4,152	1,398
397	08090	Wenonah	$43,040	$111,058	9,843	3,089
398	08740	Ocean Gate	$42,958	$67,788	1,682	743
399	08045	Lawnside	$42,951	$74,250	3,059	1,146
400	08872	Parlin	$42,904	$91,596	19,613	7,415
401	08005	Barnegat	$42,861	$84,425	25,578	10,385
402	08009	Berlin	$42,823	$94,351	14,483	5,523
403	08004	Atco	$42,755	$97,821	10,966	4,014
404	07064	Port Reading	$42,718	$140,104	4,031	1,210
405	07307	Jersey City	$42,709	$76,664	42,184	17,132
406	07660	Ridgefield Park	$42,695	$94,047	13,161	5,070
407	08757	Toms River	$42,623	$53,877	35,419	18,015
408	08817	Edison	$42,617	$105,419	48,140	16,297
409	08032	Grenloch	$42,576	$185,288	226	64
410	08016	Burlington	$42,545	$88,691	34,710	12,907
411	07650	Palisades Park	$42,538	$93,250	20,331	7,119
412	08332	Millville	$42,466	$64,973	35,292	14,498
413	07643	Little Ferry	$42,435	$72,722	10,954	4,334
414	08609	Trenton, Hamilton	$42,335	$46,849	12,799	4,607
415	08759	Manchester Township	$42,285	$49,455	33,979	19,956
416	07057	Wallington	$42,203	$79,270	11,838	4,994
417	07880	Vienna	$42,150	$107,235	357	101
418	08555	Roosevelt	$41,976	$101,339	1,037	335
419	08026	Gibbsboro	$41,960	$93,103	2,278	782
	–	United States of America	$41,804	$74,755	333,287,550	129,870,930
420	07721	Cliffwood	$41,788	$105,302	3,958	1,466
421	07508	Haledon	$41,769	$95,711	23,631	8,064
422	07029	Harrison	$41,669	$71,750	21,935	9,377
423	08562	Wrightstown	$41,591	$86,797	3,976	1,527
424	08854	Piscataway	$41,562	$123,236	60,233	17,079
425	08027	Gibbstown	$41,524	$90,345	4,921	1,958
426	08007	Barrington	$41,340	$87,761	5,560	2,528
427	08012	Blackwood	$41,327	$86,872	40,320	15,487
428	07823	Belvidere	$41,006	$75,104	7,644	3,558
429	07644	Lodi	$40,888	$80,044	25,969	9,279
430	08068	Pemberton	$40,679	$79,741	7,033	2,711
431	08049	Magnolia	$40,666	$83,528	5,216	2,117
432	08322	Franklinville	$40,535	$102,243	10,355	3,483
433	08330	Mays Landing	$40,298	$83,663	29,895	11,768
434	08205	Galloway	$40,261	$83,247	28,491	11,068
435	08882	South River	$40,055	$95,981	16,081	5,555
436	07847	Kenvil	$39,925	$77,519	1,685	701
437	08107	Oaklyn	$39,891	$68,627	13,568	5,740
438	08880	South Bound Brook	$39,845	$92,625	4,838	1,951
439	08318	Elmer	$39,807	$83,227	12,069	4,372
440	08244	Somers Point	$39,722	$67,300	10,631	4,791
441	07606	South Hackensack	$39,716	$87,813	2,820	918
442	07002	Bayonne	$39,629	$80,044	70,497	27,198
443	08328	Malaga	$39,531	$93,313	1,528	577
444	07865	Port Murray	$39,459	$128,558	2,533	755
445	08865	Phillipsburg, Alpha	$39,434	$73,519	30,561	13,261
446	07420	Haskell	$39,378	$99,375	5,185	1,857
447	08070	Pennsville	$39,374	$74,518	12,468	5,121
448	07740	Long Branch	$39,312	$72,520	32,091	12,876
449	07047	North Bergen	$39,248	$76,053	62,066	23,959
450	08511	Cookstown	$39,216	$76,094	880	329
451	08201	Absecon	$39,166	$67,100	10,078	4,086
452	08081	Sicklerville	$39,153	$97,931	50,604	17,361
453	07088	Vauxhall	$38,993	$86,556	3,056	1,145
454	07093	West New York	$38,876	$70,683	64,203	25,581
455	08038	Hancocks Bridge	$38,864	$87,083	380	157
456	08349	Port Norris	$38,841	$57,050	2,450	845
457	07306	Jersey City	$38,823	$74,610	54,779	22,582
458	08234	Egg Harbor Township	$38,804	$92,681	46,462	16,186
459	08215	Egg Harbor City	$38,800	$74,838	13,789	5,482
460	07109	Belleville	$38,799	$85,374	37,893	13,715
461	08344	Newfield	$38,797	$69,449	4,752	1,887
462	08066	Paulsboro	$38,645	$55,147	7,859	3,416
463	08059	Mount Ephraim	$38,632	$85,313	5,521	2,231
464	08270	Woodbine	$38,564	$90,000	8,231	3,186
465	07205	Hillside	$38,490	$89,804	22,262	7,248
466	08093	Westville	$38,197	$65,283	9,690	4,304
467	08091	West Berlin	$38,124	$87,593	5,881	2,266
468	08052	Maple Shade	$38,109	$71,748	19,885	8,680
469	07801	Dover, Victory Gardens	$37,775	$70,942	26,548	8,899
470	08312	Clayton	$37,650	$88,963	8,460	3,080
471	08109	Pennsauken	$37,508	$80,527	23,747	8,796
472	08031	Bellmawr	$37,352	$71,935	11,677	4,834
473	07203	Roselle	$37,208	$75,264	22,500	8,223
474	07203	Roselle	$37,208	$75,264	22,500	8,223
475	08015	Browns Mills	$37,127	$75,040	19,164	7,131
476	08561	Windsor	$37,084	$54,318	328	138
477	08046	Willingboro	$36,957	$88,552	31,812	10,679
478	08353	Shiloh	$36,910	$87,917	305	115
479	08063	National Park	$36,896	$82,639	3,070	1,062
480	07305	Jersey City	$36,803	$73,735	70,738	25,628
481	08078	Runnemede	$36,751	$82,750	8,005	3,061
482	08072	Quinton	$36,679	$62,738	249	104
483	07407	Elmwood Park	$36,519	$84,578	21,261	7,220
484	07036	Linden	$36,343	$85,748	44,996	15,976
485	07734	Keansburg	$36,222	$84,508	13,540	5,101
486	08350	Richland	$36,103	–	518	156
487	08029	Glendora	$36,017	$83,857	5,850	2,307
488	07022	Fairview	$35,932	$59,359	14,935	5,823
489	08314	Delmont	$35,817	–	587	217
490	08610	Trenton, Hamilton	$35,616	$82,945	32,324	11,672
491	07032	Kearny	$35,585	$81,307	41,157	14,703
492	08021	Clementon	$35,482	$63,881	47,946	20,321
493	08028	Glassboro	$35,462	$79,810	24,360	7,921
494	08010	Beverly	$35,449	$80,663	11,458	4,229
495	07844	Hope	$35,138	$75,833	104	46
496	08326	Landisville	$35,073	$92,778	1,063	370
497	07062	Plainfield	$34,978	$90,477	14,253	4,593
498	07304	Jersey City	$34,739	$65,504	50,805	19,122
499	08014	Bridgeport	$34,716	–	294	91
500	08346	Newtonville	$34,601	$76,938	430	185
501	08340	Milmay	$34,451	$70,536	939	385
502	07026	Garfield	$34,418	$72,026	32,472	11,544
503	08345	Newport	$34,335	$60,268	709	337
504	07001	Avenel	$34,181	$84,549	17,211	5,394
505	07074	Moonachie	$33,568	$90,263	3,093	950
506	08311	Cedarville	$33,262	$72,083	1,601	549
507	08079	Salem	$32,400	$50,975	10,426	4,168
508	07011	Clifton	$32,369	$71,489	40,042	13,784
509	07008	Carteret	$31,881	$79,081	25,170	8,162
510	08638	Trenton, Ewing	$31,647	$66,194	23,804	8,698
511	08327	Leesburg	$31,626	$76,190	3,836	198
512	08733	Lakehurst	$31,152	$79,025	2,855	1,033
513	07087	Union City	$31,030	$59,967	67,258	25,610
514	07018	East Orange	$30,978	$57,482	29,216	11,276
515	08629	Trenton, Hamilton	$30,700	$79,724	13,075	4,260
516	07208	North Elizabeth	$30,601	$59,085	32,632	12,119
517	08341	Minotola	$30,452	$73,750	2,286	811
518	08042	Juliustown	$30,394	–	33	19
519	08360	Vineland	$30,389	$61,484	43,784	15,527
520	07017	East Orange	$30,216	$60,137	39,557	15,026
521	07608	Teterboro	$29,955	–	91	27
522	08890	Zarephath	$29,797	–	74	8
523	07060	Plainfield	$29,780	$66,761	47,883	15,678
524	08030	Gloucester City	$29,598	$68,325	13,251	4,868
525	07063	Plainfield	$29,345	$82,188	14,849	4,237
526	08110	Pennsauken	$29,217	$77,585	19,465	6,162
527	08641	Trenton, McGuire AFB	$28,792	$82,480	4,886	1,433
528	07102	Newark	$28,639	$35,515	13,506	6,288
529	08069	Penns Grove	$28,370	$62,911	13,402	5,229
530	08329	Mauricetown	$28,311	$61,221	321	144
531	07050	Orange	$27,648	$50,498	33,523	12,306
532	08324	Heislerville	$27,565	$71,196	327	118
533	07112	Newark	$27,468	$49,966	27,122	10,823
534	07504	Paterson	$27,421	$64,810	13,781	4,163
535	07111	Irvington	$27,378	$57,293	60,268	22,178
536	08832	Keasbey	$27,279	$61,200	2,745	892
537	08352	Rosenhayn	$26,909	$79,226	388	85
538	08861	Perth Amboy	$26,815	$58,221	58,136	19,610
539	07107	Newark	$26,749	$46,916	41,907	15,112
540	07202	Elizabeth	$26,725	$63,032	44,673	14,985
541	08039	Harrisonville	$26,706	–	17	5
542	07106	Newark	$26,530	$48,983	36,538	12,682
543	08232	Pleasantville	$26,452	$49,701	20,241	6,438
544	08316	Dorchester	$26,385	$35,217	163	96
545	07201	Elizabeth	$26,374	$60,377	27,996	9,545
546	07503	Paterson	$26,083	$60,431	19,625	6,291
547	07104	Newark	$26,053	$51,511	55,412	20,197
548	08302	Bridgeton	$25,874	$58,185	47,487	14,417
549	08611	Trenton, Hamilton	$25,834	$48,542	31,660	10,738
550	07513	Paterson	$25,303	$71,023	11,069	3,161
551	08618	Trenton, Ewing	$24,757	$45,334	39,047	13,813
552	07502	Paterson	$24,478	$72,036	17,328	4,561
553	08608	Trenton	$24,234	–	786	460
554	08401	Atlantic City	$24,108	$35,279	38,726	16,514
555	07055	Passaic	$23,832	$57,832	70,048	20,182
556	08901	New Brunswick	$23,707	$57,138	56,870	15,626
557	07105	Newark	$23,479	$51,927	56,696	19,484
558	07514	Paterson	$23,434	$56,686	18,461	6,167
559	07206	Elizabethport	$22,470	$54,206	30,364	8,839
560	07524	Paterson	$22,400	$47,889	15,139	4,471
561	08023	Deepwater	$22,110	$50,833	282	98
562	07103	Newark	$21,850	$40,653	35,318	12,793
563	07108	Newark	$21,730	$32,739	27,830	11,130
564	07501	Paterson	$21,039	$38,776	35,492	12,172
565	08701	Lakewood	$20,885	$58,949	134,008	30,816
566	08102	Camden	$20,736	$30,679	8,418	3,058
567	07522	Paterson	$20,350	$46,711	22,377	7,140
568	08105	Camden	$18,984	$41,742	26,615	8,200
569	08104	Camden	$18,553	$32,637	21,656	8,272
570	07114	Newark	$17,376	$32,591	13,154	4,205
571	08103	Camden	$17,050	$34,434	12,682	4,179
572	08640	Trenton, Fort Dix	$16,726	$91,250	7,781	891
573	07505	Paterson	$14,927	$23,780	4,592	1,552
