= Scientific Advisory Committee on the Medical Implications of Less-Lethal Weapons =

The Scientific Advisory Committee on the Medical Implications of Less-Lethal Weapons (SACMILL) is an advisory non-departmental public body of the British Ministry of Defence set up to advise the British government in regard to the medical implications of less-lethal weapons. Set up in 2009, it was previously a sub-committee of the Defence Scientific Advisory Council, known as the Defence Scientific Advisory Council Sub-committee on the Medical Implications of Less-lethal Weapons (DOMILL). It reports to the Surgeon General.
