= Toms River, New Jersey =

Township in Ocean County, New Jersey, US

- Township
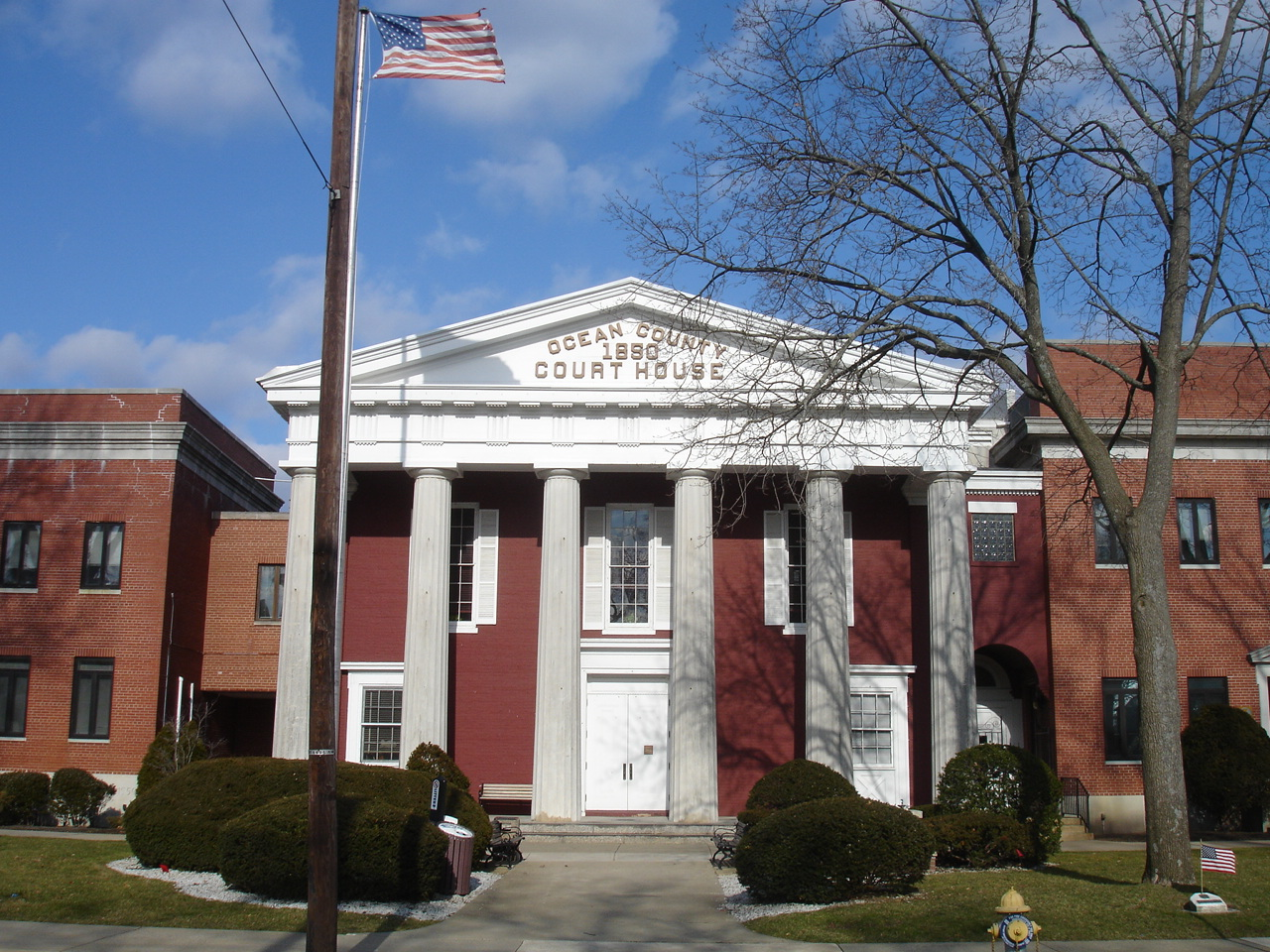
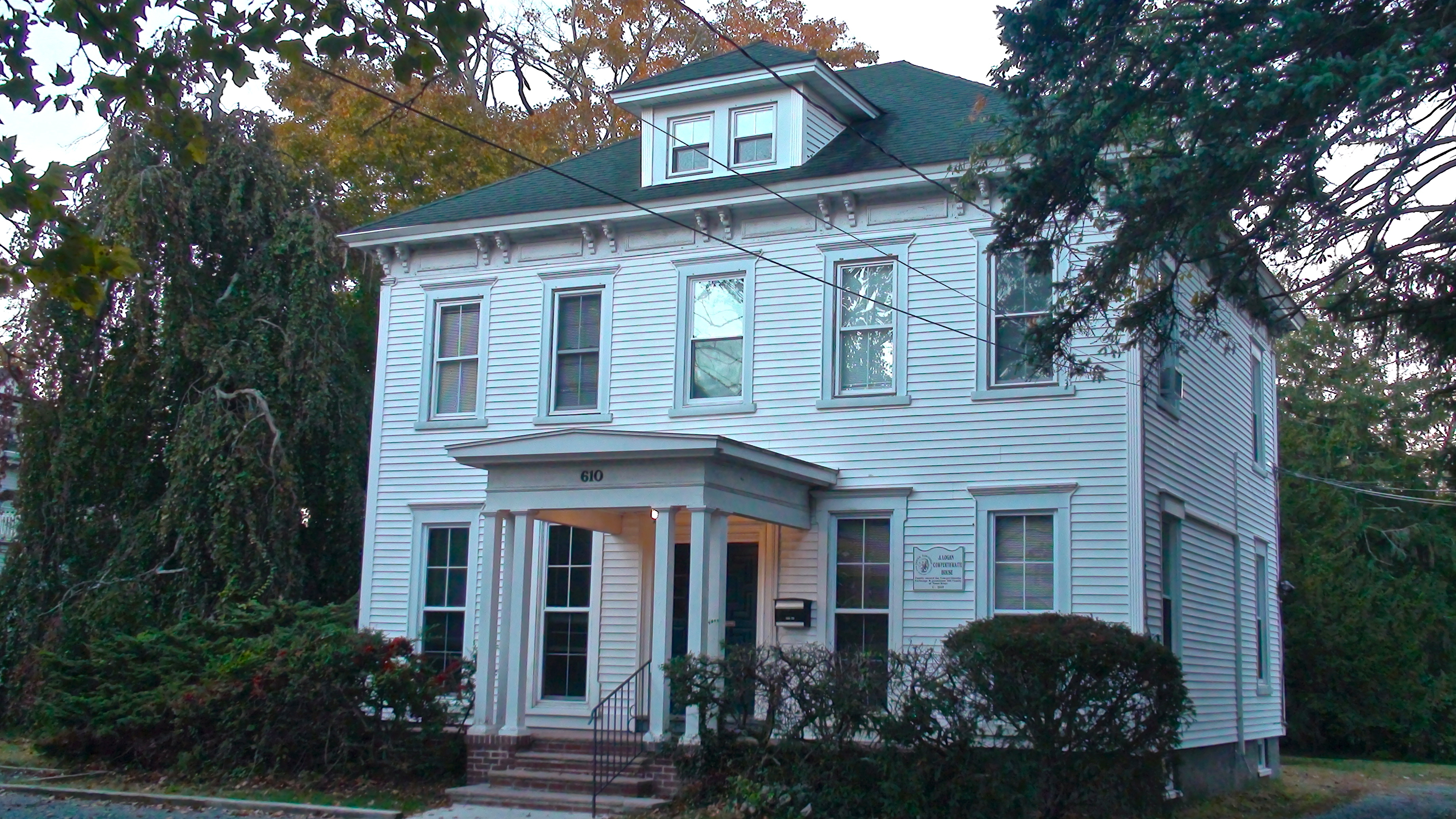
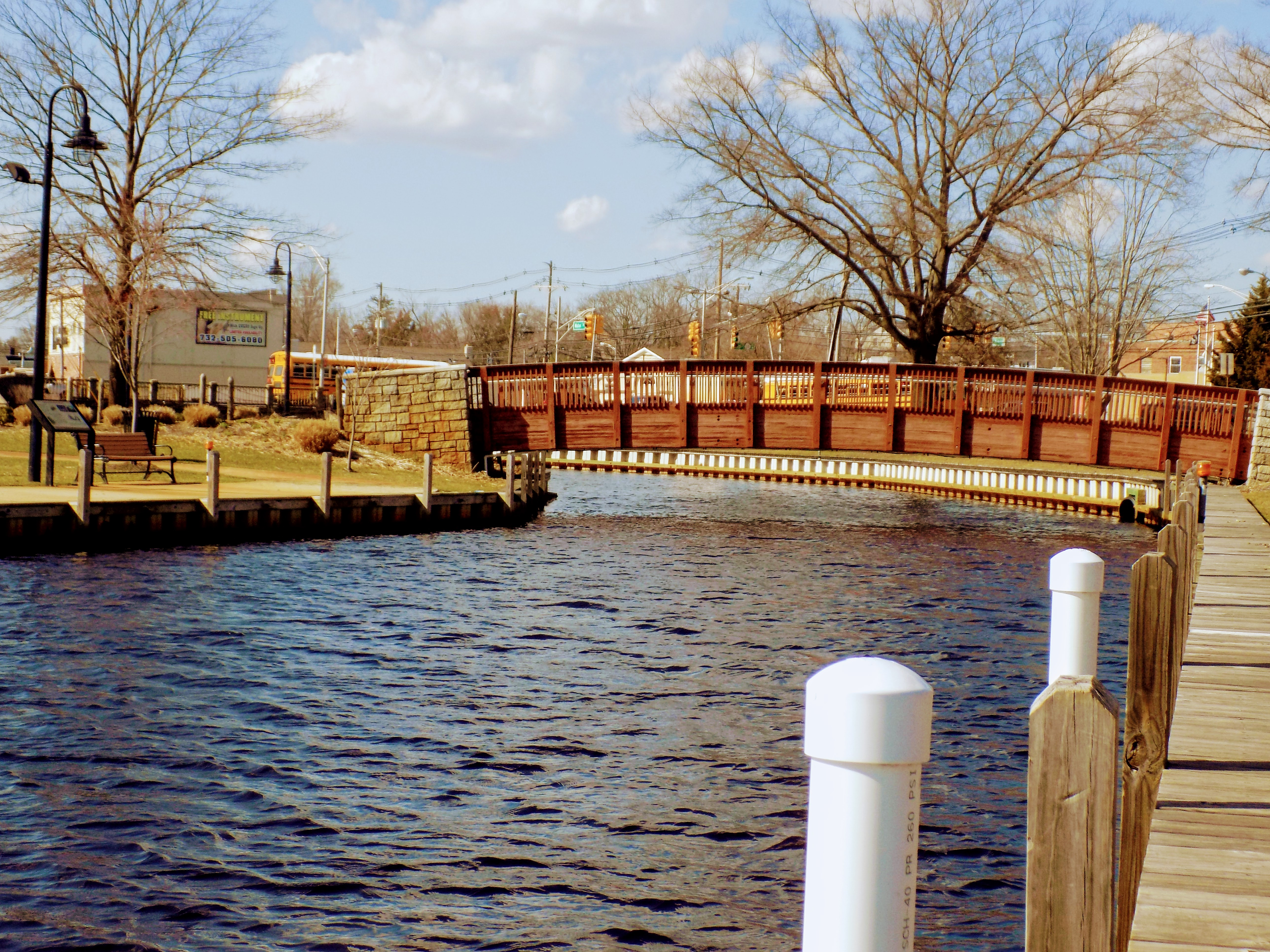
- Ocean County Courthouse Last address of architect Sergey Padyukov at 610 Main Street Luker Bridge over the Toms River in Huddy Park

- Seal
- Motto: "Great Places. Familiar Faces."
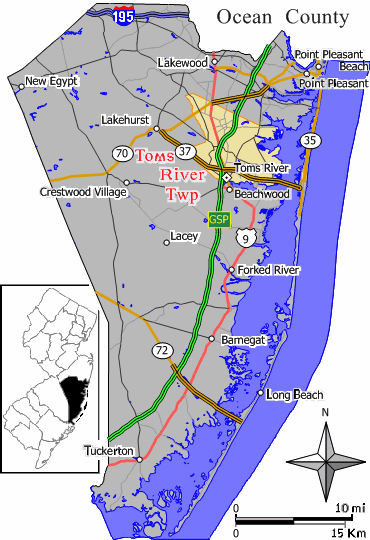
- Location of Toms River in Ocean County highlighted in yellow (right). Inset map: Location of Ocean County in New Jersey highlighted in black (left).

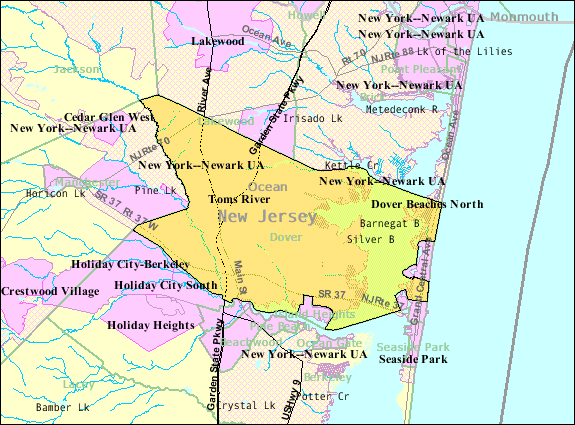
- Census Bureau map of Toms River Township, NJ
- Interactive map of Toms River, New Jersey
- Location in Ocean County Location in New Jersey Location in the United States
- Coordinates: 39.994264°N 74.166154°W
- Country: United States
- State: New Jersey
- County: Ocean
- Royal charter: March 1, 1768 (as Dover Township)
- Incorporated: February 21, 1798
- Renamed: November 14, 2006 (as Toms River Township)

Government
  - Type: Faulkner Act (mayor–council)
  - Body: Township Council
  - Mayor: Daniel T. Rodrick (R, term ends December 31, 2027)
  - Administrator: Jon Salonis
  - Municipal clerk: Stephen Hensel

Area
  - Total: 52.89 sq mi (136.98 km^{2})
  - Land: 40.55 sq mi (105.03 km^{2})
  - Water: 12.34 sq mi (31.95 km^{2}) 23.32%
  - Rank: 32nd of 565 in state 7th of 33 in county
- Elevation: 26 ft (7.9 m)

Population (2020)
  - Total: 95,438
  - Estimate (2025): 100,899 ▲
  - Rank: 8th of 565 in state 2nd of 33 in county
  - Density: 2,488/sq mi (961/km^{2})
  - Rank: 263rd of 565 in state 12th of 33 in county
- Time zone: UTC−05:00 (Eastern (EST))
  - Summer (DST): UTC−04:00 (Eastern (EDT))
- ZIP Codes: 08753–08757
- Area codes: 732/848
- FIPS code: 3402973125
- GNIS feature ID: 0882074
- Website: www.tomsrivertownship.com

Toms River is a township located on the Jersey Shore in Ocean County, in the U.S. state of New Jersey. Its mainland portion is also a census-designated place of the same name, which serves as the county seat of Ocean County. Formerly known as the Township of Dover, voters in a 2006 referendum approved a change of the official name to the Township of Toms River, adopting the name of the largest unincorporated community within the township. The township is a bedroom suburb of New York City in the New York metropolitan area, and a regional commercial hub in central New Jersey.

As of the 2020 United States census, the township was the state's eighth-most-populous municipality, with a population of 95,438, its highest decennial count ever and an increase of 4,199 (+4.6%) from the 2010 census count of 91,239, which had in turn reflected an increase of 1,533 (+1.7%) from the 89,706 counted in the 2000 census.

Toms River is featured in various TV and news media, including MTV's Made and Jersey Shore (seasons 1, 3, and 5), HBO's Boardwalk Empire, and the original The Amityville Horror movie. In 1998, Toms River East Little League won the Little League World Series. The township has what is said to be the second-largest Halloween parade in the world.

In 2006, Toms River was ranked by Morgan Quitno Press as the 15th safest city in the United States, of 369 cities nationwide. In 2007, Toms River was again ranked as the 14th-safest city in the United States of 371 cities nationwide.

== History ==
=== Founding and early history ===
Much of the early history of the settlement of Toms River is obscured by conflicting stories. Various sources list the eponym of the township as either English captain William Tom, or farmer and ferryman Thomas Luker. In 1992, as part of celebrations commemorating the township's 225th anniversary, official recognition was granted to the tradition that the "Tom" in "Toms River" was for Thomas Luker, who ran a ferry across Goose Creek (now the Toms River). During the 19th century, Toms River became a center for shipbuilding, whaling, fishing, and iron and lumber production. The settlement and the river were usually spelled "Tom's River" in its early days, though its current spelling has been standard since the middle of the 19th century.

Located in the southern section of the Shrewsbury Township, a royal charter was granted on March 1, 1768, and Dover Township was formed. During the American Revolutionary War, Toms River was home to a strategically important salt works that supplied colonial militias, as well as a base for privateer vessels that plundered British and Tory ships off the coast. In March 1782, a group of British and loyalist soldiers attacked a blockhouse along the river that housed the colonial militia and captured Captain Joshua Huddy, who was later hanged at Sandy Hook. Also destroyed were the salt works and most of the houses in the village. The incident greatly complicated the tense relationship between the British, loyalists, and colonists, and was a factor in prolonging the peace negotiations that were then in progress in Paris until 1783.

Dover Township was incorporated as one of New Jersey's first 104 townships by the Township Act of 1798 of the New Jersey Legislature on February 21, 1798. The township's original name was for Dover, England.

The village of Toms River is listed on both the national and state registers of historic places.

=== Mid-19th and early 20th centuries ===
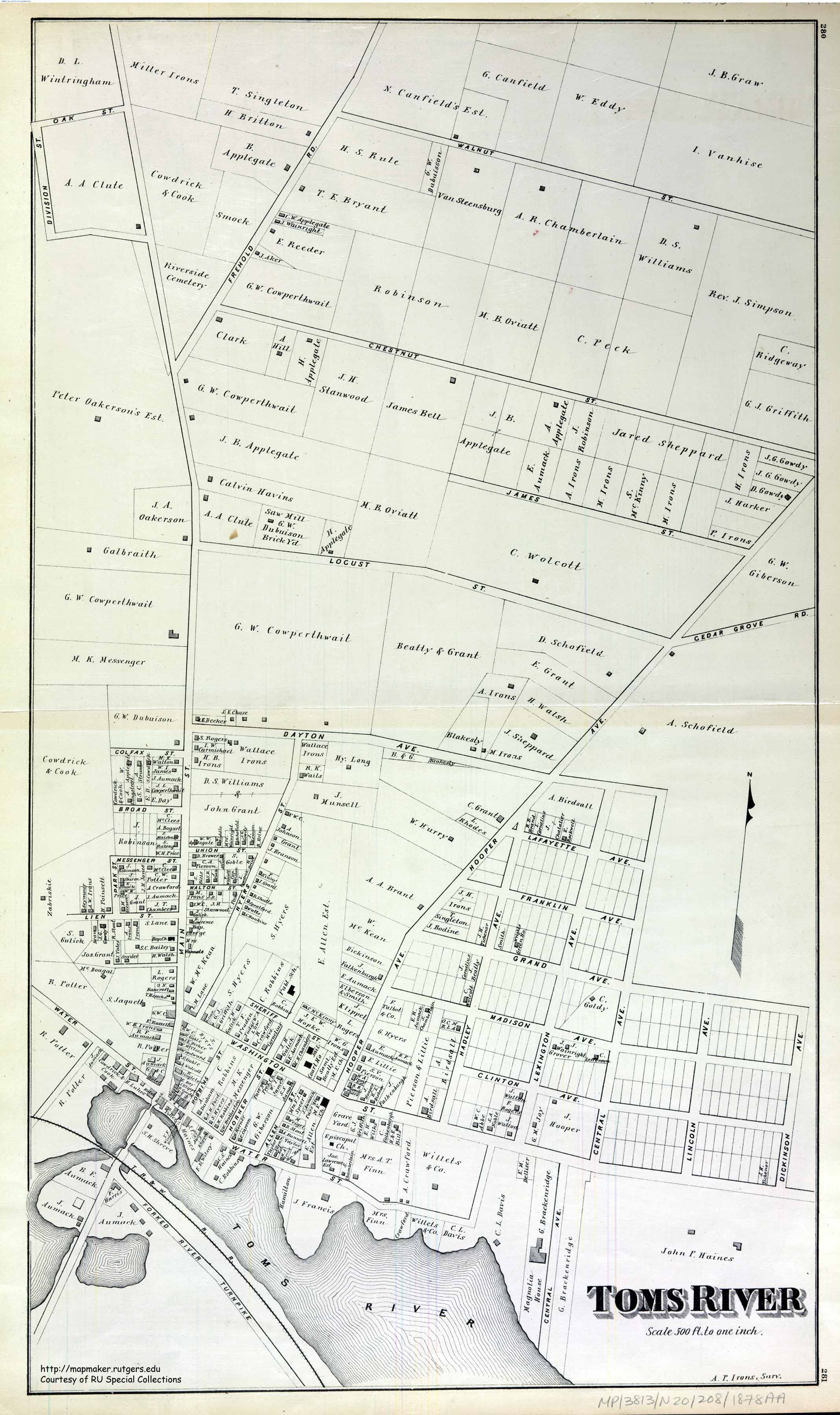
Map of Toms River in 1878

In 1850, Toms River became the county seat of the newly created Ocean County when it was formed out of southern Monmouth County. During the second half of the 19th century and the early decades of the 20th, many new towns were carved out of Dover Township, including Brick, Jackson, Lakewood, and Berkeley. The Village of Toms River attempted twice—in 1914 and 1926—to secede from Dover Township, but residents were unsuccessful. The part of Toms River on the south side of the river stretching down to Berkeley Township incorporated as South Toms River in 1927, but the core of the original village on the north side remains part of the wider township to this day.

Portions of the township were taken to form Jackson Township (March 6, 1844), Union Township (March 10, 1846, now Barnegat Township), Brick Township (February 15, 1850), Manchester Township (April 6, 1865), Berkeley Township (March 31, 1875), Island Heights (May 6, 1887), Lavallette (December 21, 1887), and Seaside Heights (February 26, 1913).

=== Mid and late 20th century ===
In the last two decades of the twentieth century, the demographics of the township changed substantially, adding over 20,000 residents just in the 1990s alone. While the village is still the center of municipal and county government, the population in the area exploded in the decades after World War II, due in part to the completion of the Garden State Parkway. Whereas the village was the largest and most densely populated section of the township for over two centuries, the vast majority of residents now shop and work in other sections of the town.

==== Superfund site ====
In the mid-1990s, state and federal health and environmental agencies identified an increased incidence of childhood cancers in Toms River from the 1970–1995 period. Multiple investigations by state and federal environmental and health agencies indicated that the likely source of the increased cancer risk was contamination from Toms River Chemical Plant (then operated by Ciba-Geigy), which had been in operation since 1952. The area was designated a United States Environmental Protection Agency Superfund site in 1983, after an underground plume of toxic chemicals was identified. The following year, a discharge pipe was shut down after a sinkhole at the corner of Bay Avenue and Vaughn Avenue revealed that it had been leaking. The plant ceased operation in 1996.

A follow-up study from the 1996–2000 period indicated that while there were more cancer cases than expected, rates had significantly fallen and the difference was statistically insignificant compared to normal statewide cancer rates.

Since 1996, the Toms River water system has been subject to the most stringent water testing in the state and is considered safe for consumption. Dan Fagin's Toms River: A Story of Science and Salvation, the 2014 Pulitzer Prize winning book, examined the issue of industrial pollution in detail.

=== Toms River Township ===
"Toms River" at one time referred only to the rural farming community of Toms River, a small part of the vast Township of Dover that included several other distinct settlements. With the United States Postal Service's adoption of Toms River mailing addresses for Dover Township, coupled with demographic changes in the other sections, those inside and outside began referring to all of mainland Dover Township as Toms River. In the 1990 census, the census-designated place called "Toms River" only included the downtown village area that included fewer than 8,000 residents in 1990. Due to complaints of confusion, the CDP was broadened to include all of mainland Dover Township to better reflect the more common usage for the area.

Over the years, confusion over the name of the township had become an issue for many residents. A movement organized around the Dover Township Name Change Committee, founded by Mayor Paul Brush and supported by the Ocean County Chamber of Commerce, collected signatures to put a name change question on the ballot in November 2006. On Election Day, November 7, 2006, over 60% of residents voted to approve changing the name from the Township of Dover to the Township of Toms River. The name change campaign featured the slogan "Toms River YES", signifying a yes vote for the name change, and the name was officially changed on November 14, 2006.

== Geography ==
According to the United States Census Bureau, the township had a total area of 52.89 square miles (136.98 km^{2}), including 40.55 square miles (105.03 km^{2}) of land and 12.34 square miles (31.95 km^{2}) of water (23.32%). Toms River is 70 miles (110 km) south of New York City and 55 miles (89 km) east of Philadelphia.

While most of Toms River is on the mainland, Dover Beaches North and South are situated on the Barnegat Peninsula, a long, narrow barrier peninsula that separates Barnegat Bay from the Atlantic Ocean. Dover Beaches South adjoins the independent municipalities of Lavallette to the north and Seaside Heights to the south.

Dover Beaches North (2020 Census population of 1,277), Dover Beaches South (1,331) and Toms River CDP (92,830) are census-designated places and unincorporated communities located within Toms River Township. Other unincorporated communities, localities and place names located partially or completely within the township include Andrew Point, Andrews, Bay Shore, Cattus Island, Cedar Grove, Chadwick, Coates Point, East Dover, Gilford Park, Gilmores Island, Green Island, Long Point, Normandy Beach, Ocean Beach, Ortley Beach, Pelican Island, Pine View, Pleasant Plains, Shelter Cove, Silverton, Tilton Point, West Dover, and White Oak Bottom.

Toms River includes the ZIP Codes 08753, 08754, 08755, 08756, 08757, and 08739. Ortley Beach (Dover Beaches South) shares ZIP Code 08751 with Seaside Heights. Manchester does not have its own post office, and parts of Manchester use a Toms River mailing address under ZIP Code 08757.

Toms River borders the Ocean County municipalities of Berkeley Township, Brick, Island Heights, Jackson, Lakewood, Lavallette, Manchester, Seaside Heights, and South Toms River.

The township is one of 11 municipalities in Ocean County that are part of the Toms River watershed.

=== Climate ===
Toms River has a humid subtropical climate, with significant rainfall throughout the year. The Köppen climate classification of the area is Cfa.

The township was severely affected by Superstorm Sandy in October 2012. Many low-lying areas of the township, including Silverton and the downtown area, saw their worst flooding ever when the storm surge overwhelmed the Barnegat Bay up and down the Jersey Shore. The barrier islands, just across the bridge, suffered even worse devastation from the storm surge brought by the hurricane. Extremes range from a record high of 105 °F on both July 19, 1999, and August 9, 1896, to a low of −24 °F on January 16, 1988.

Climate data for Toms River
Month	Jan	Feb	Mar	Apr	May	Jun	Jul	Aug	Sep	Oct	Nov	Dec	Year
Record high °F (°C)	75 (24)	75 (24)	87 (31)	97 (36)	99 (37)	102 (39)	105 (41)	105 (41)	103 (39)	91 (33)	85 (29)	75 (24)	105 (41)
Mean daily maximum °F (°C)	41 (5)	44 (7)	51 (11)	61 (16)	71 (22)	80 (27)	85 (29)	83 (28)	77 (25)	67 (19)	57 (14)	46 (8)	64 (18)
Mean daily minimum °F (°C)	22 (−6)	24 (−4)	30 (−1)	39 (4)	49 (9)	59 (15)	64 (18)	62 (17)	55 (13)	43 (6)	35 (2)	27 (−3)	42 (6)
Record low °F (°C)	−24 (−31)	−24 (−31)	−4 (−20)	12 (−11)	27 (−3)	37 (3)	43 (6)	38 (3)	31 (−1)	20 (−7)	9 (−13)	−12 (−24)	−24 (−31)
Average precipitation inches (mm)	3.92 (100)	3.30 (84)	4.79 (122)	4.07 (103)	3.73 (95)	3.80 (97)	4.60 (117)	4.69 (119)	3.79 (96)	3.90 (99)	4.11 (104)	4.51 (115)	49.8 (1,260)
Average snowfall inches (cm)	7.01 (17.8)	5.99 (15.2)	5.00 (12.7)	0.98 (2.5)	0 (0)	0 (0)	0 (0)	0 (0)	0 (0)	0 (0)	0.98 (2.5)	4.02 (10.2)	23.98 (60.9)
Average precipitation days	11	10	11	11	11	10	9	9	8	8	10	10	118
Average snowy days	4	3	2	.5	0	0	0	0	0	0	.2	2	11.7
Mean monthly sunshine hours	155.0	155.4	201.5	216.0	244.9	270.0	275.9	260.4	219.0	204.6	156.0	136.4	2,495.1
Source: weather.com

== Demographics ==
Historical population
Census	Pop.	Note	%±
1790	910		—
1810	1,882		—
1820	1,916		1.8%
1830	2,898		51.3%
1840	2,752		−5.0%
1850	2,385	*	−13.3%
1860	2,378		−0.3%
1870	3,044	*	28.0%
1880	2,489	*	−18.2%
1890	2,609	*	4.8%
1900	2,618		0.3%
1910	2,452		−6.3%
1920	2,198	*	−10.4%
1930	3,970		80.6%
1940	5,165		30.1%
1950	7,707		49.2%
1960	17,414		126.0%
1970	43,751		151.2%
1980	64,455		47.3%
1990	76,371		18.5%
2000	89,706		17.5%
2010	91,239		1.7%
2020	95,438		4.6%
2025 (est.)	100,899	▲	5.7%
Population sources: 1790–1920; 1850–2000 1850–1870 1850; 1870 1880–1890 1890–1910; 1910–1930 1940–2000; 2000 2010 2020 * = Lost territory in previous decade.

=== 2020 census ===
Toms River Township, New Jersey – Racial and ethnic composition Note: the US Census treats Hispanic/Latino as an ethnic category. This table excludes Latinos from the racial categories and assigns them to a separate category. Hispanics/Latinos may be of any race.
Race / Ethnicity (NH = Non-Hispanic)	Pop 1990	Pop 2000	Pop 2010	Pop 2020	% 1990	% 2000	% 2010	% 2020
White alone (NH)	72,592	81,093	77,241	73,671	95.05%	90.40%	84.66%	77.19%
Black or African American alone (NH)	613	1,490	2,213	3,155	0.80%	1.66%	2.43%	3.31%
Native American or Alaska Native alone (NH)	98	72	83	65	0.13%	0.08%	0.09%	0.07%
Asian alone (NH)	1,097	2,198	3,237	3,780	1.44%	2.45%	3.55%	3.96%
Pacific Islander alone (NH)	N/A	15	15	11	N/A	0.02%	0.02%	0.01%
Other race alone (NH)	27	51	138	445	0.04%	0.06%	0.15%	0.47%
Mixed race or Multiracial (NH)	N/A	717	1,081	2,718	N/A	0.80%	1.18%	2.85%
Hispanic or Latino (any race)	1,944	4,070	7,231	11,593	2.55%	4.54%	7.93%	12.15%
Total	76,371	89,706	91,239	95,438	100.00%	100.00%	100.00%	100.00%

=== 2010 census ===
The 2010 United States census counted 91,239 people, 34,760 households, and 24,367 families in the township. The population density was 2,253.5 per square mile (870.1/km^{2}). There were 43,334 housing units at an average density of 1,070.3 per square mile (413.2/km^{2}). The racial makeup was 89.91% (82,035) White, 2.70% (2,465) Black or African American, 0.17% (156) Native American, 3.58% (3,266) Asian, 0.02% (17) Pacific Islander, 1.96% (1,785) from other races, and 1.66% (1,515) from two or more races. Hispanic or Latino residents of any race were 7.93% (7,231) of the population.

Of the 34,760 households, 28.2% had children under the age of 18; 54.4% were married couples living together; 11.7% had a female householder with no husband present and 29.9% were non-families. Of all households, 25.1% were made up of individuals and 12.1% had someone living alone who was 65 years of age or older. The average household size was 2.58 and the average family size was 3.10.

21.3% of the population were under the age of 18, 7.9% from 18 to 24, 23.8% from 25 to 44, 29.7% from 45 to 64, and 17.3% who were 65 years of age or older. The median age was 43.0 years. For every 100 females, the population had 92.3 males. For every 100 females ages 18 and older there were 89.6 males.

The Census Bureau's 2006–2010 American Community Survey showed that (in 2010 inflation-adjusted dollars) median household income was $71,934 (with a margin of error of +/− $2,094) and the median family income was $83,924 (+/− $2,842). Males had a median income of $59,860 (+/− $2,733) versus $42,192 (+/− $2,081) for females. The per capita income for the township was $33,423 (+/− $926). About 4.5% of families and 5.7% of the population were below the poverty line, including 7.4% of those under age 18 and 4.6% of those age 65 or over.

=== 2000 census ===
As of the 2000 United States census there were 89,706 people, 33,510 households, and 24,428 families residing in the township. The population density was 2,189.5 inhabitants per square mile (845.4/km^{2}). There were 41,116 housing units at an average density of 1,003.5 per square mile (387.5/km^{2}). The racial makeup of the township was 93.57% White, 1.75% African American, 0.13% Native American, 2.46% Asian, 0.02% Pacific Islander, 0.95% from other races, and 1.12% from two or more races. Hispanic or Latino of any race were 4.54% of the population.

There were 33,510 households, out of which 31.2% had children under the age of 18 living with them, 59.1% were married couples living together, 10.5% had a female householder with no husband present, and 27.1% were non-families. 22.7% of all households were made up of individuals, and 11.0% had someone living alone who was 65 years of age or older. The average household size was 2.62 and the average family size was 3.09.

In the township the population was spread out, with 23.3% under the age of 18, 7.2% from 18 to 24, 27.2% from 25 to 44, 25.1% from 45 to 64, and 17.2% who were 65 years of age or older. The median age was 40 years. For every 100 females, there were 92.7 males. For every 100 females age 18 and over, there were 89.1 males.

The median income for a household in the township was $54,776, and the median income for a family was $62,561. Males had a median income of $47,390 versus $30,834 for females. The per capita income for the township was $25,010. About 4.0% of families and 5.7% of the population were below the poverty line, including 6.7% of those under age 18 and 6.1% of those age 65 or over.

== Economy ==
Downtown Toms River

Toms River has many shopping malls including Ocean County Mall (the only enclosed mall in Ocean County) and Seacourt Pavilion, located across Bay Avenue from the Ocean County Mall. It is home to the corporate headquarters of EGM Green, as well as the headquarters for OceanFirst Bank.

== Arts and culture ==
The RWJBarnabas Health Arena (formerly Pine Belt Arena), a 3,500-seat public arena connected to Toms River High School North, is used for concerts, sporting events, and some small local events throughout the year to raise money for the school district. Starting in January 2018, the name was officially changed to the "RWJBarnabas Health Arena" after the district signed a five-year deal with RWJBarnabas Health under which the district would be paid a total of $637,500 for the naming rights.

Toms River Fest was an annual event held during the summer in Toms River, bringing many people from in and out of the area, with 25,000 attendees at the 2008 event.

== Sports ==
Toms River made national headlines in the 1990s when their Little League Baseball team, nicknamed "Beast from the East", competed in the Little League World Series three times in five years. The team won in 1998, after defeating Japan by a score of 12–9. More than 40,000 people lined Route 37 for a parade following their victory.

Toms River Little League made it back to the 2010 World Series, giving the town its record fourth Mid-Atlantic championship, returning as regional runners up in 2021. In 2022, the team again took the New Jersey State title, but lost to Massapequa in the Metro Region championship, in Bristol, Connecticut.

In 2026, the Toms River Little League Softball All-Stars made their debut in the Little League Softball World Series in Greenville, North Carolina, representing New Jersey and the Mid-Atlantic Region. The team finished in fourth place overall.

Toms River is also home to many National Champion Pop Warner Cheerleading titles, with the Toms River Angels taking home championships in several divisions in 1995, 1998–2003, 2007, 2008, 2016, 2018, and 2019; the Toms River Indians winning in 1999, 2003, and 2007; and the Toms River Little Indians taking titles in 1993, 1994, 1997, 1998, and 2005–2009. The Toms River Raiders won the Division 1 Jr., Pee Wee football title in 1996.

=== Sports complexes ===
==== John Bennett Indoor Athletic Center ====
Known locally as "The Bubble", the center is one of three indoor athletic complex's in Ocean County and one of the largest in New Jersey. It is located just south of Intermediate School East, and named after John Bennet, TRSD superintendent from 1960 to 1977. It was severely damaged as a result of Hurricane Sandy, reopening in January 2013, after repairs were completed.

The facility was damaged again in 2022, when over a foot of ice and snow fell during a January nor'easter, causing portions of the dome to collapse in on itself.

In May 2022, the complex was rebranded as part of a multiyear naming rights agreement. The facility is now called the Rothman Orthopaedic Sports Complex at the John Bennett Athletic Center.

==== RWJBarnabas Health Arena ====
A 3,204-seat multi-use center was opened to the public in 2004, attached to Toms River High School North. The sports, music, and convention center has gone by a number of different names, including: the Ritacco Center, Poland Spring Arena, and Pine Belt Arena.

The facility has hosted the NJSIAA boys and girls basketball Tournament of Champions, WWE NXT Live!, and musical acts in association with Toms River Fest, including: Gavin DeGraw, Daughtry, Avril Lavigne, Carrie Underwood, Meat Loaf, and Joan Jett, among others.

The building also serves as the location for HS North graduation ceremonies, with the inaugural event held for the Class of 2004.

== Parks and recreation ==
There are 13 parks located within and maintained by Toms River Township. Two of the newest recreational areas include the Toms River Skatepark, a 7,000 square feet (650 m^{2}) outdoor skatepark completed in 2021, and Field of Dreams Playground, a 3.5 acres (1.4 ha) gated playground opened in 2022 and designed for children with varying physical or developmental disabilities.

Joshua Huddy Park, which opened in 1905, is located in Downtown Toms River and is host to a replica constructed in 1931 of the Revolutionary War fort that was once standing near the site. The town played host to a short skirmish during the Revolution in which Captain Joshua Huddy was captured by a group of Loyalists while defending the Toms River Blockhouse and hanged without trial. The trail of Captain Huddy can be followed throughout the town.

In 1992, improvements to the park were made to mark the 225th anniversary of the township, during which time Luker Bridge was dedicated, named for Thomas Luker, the 17th century ferryman who is believed to be the river's namesake. In 2017, a $1.6 million renovation of the park was completed to commemorate the township's 250th anniversary.

In May 2025, Mayor Daniel T. Rodrick initiated plans to seize by eminent domain and raze the township's Christ Episcopal Church, established in 1865, for use as part of a nautical-themed public park, which would include a soccer field and eight pickleball courts. The plan was announced shortly after the church had requested approval to establish a homeless shelter with 17 beds. The parish and the parent Episcopal Diocese of New Jersey, which owns the 11-acre (4.5 ha) property valued at around $4 million, have stated that they will contest the seizure.

== Government ==
=== Local government ===
Since 2002, Toms River Township has operated within the Faulkner Act (formally known as the Optional Municipal Charter Law) under the Mayor-Council form of New Jersey municipal government. The township is one of 71 municipalities (of the 564) statewide that use this form of government. The governing body is composed of the Mayor and seven-member Township Council. The council includes four members who each represent one of four wards of the township and three who are chosen at-large. The mayor and the seven council members are chosen on a partisan basis as part of the November general election in odd-numbered years to serve four-year terms of office on a staggered basis, with the mayor and three at-large seats elected together and the four ward seats chosen simultaneously two years later.

In December 2017, the Township Council appointed Don Guardian, the former Mayor of Atlantic City to replace Paul J. Shives; Guardian was given an annual salary of $175,000, while Shives had been paid $223,000.

As of 2024, the Mayor of Toms River is Republican Daniel T. Rodrick, whose term of office expires December 31, 2027. Township Council members are Council President Craig Coleman (R, at-large, 2027), Council Vice President Lynne O'Toole (R, at-large, 2027), Thomas Nivison (at-large, 2027), Justin Lamb (R, Ward 1, 2025), George Lobman (R, Ward 2, 2027), James Quinlisk (R, Ward 3, 2025), and David Ciccozzi (R, Ward 4, 2025).

=== Federal, state, and county representation ===
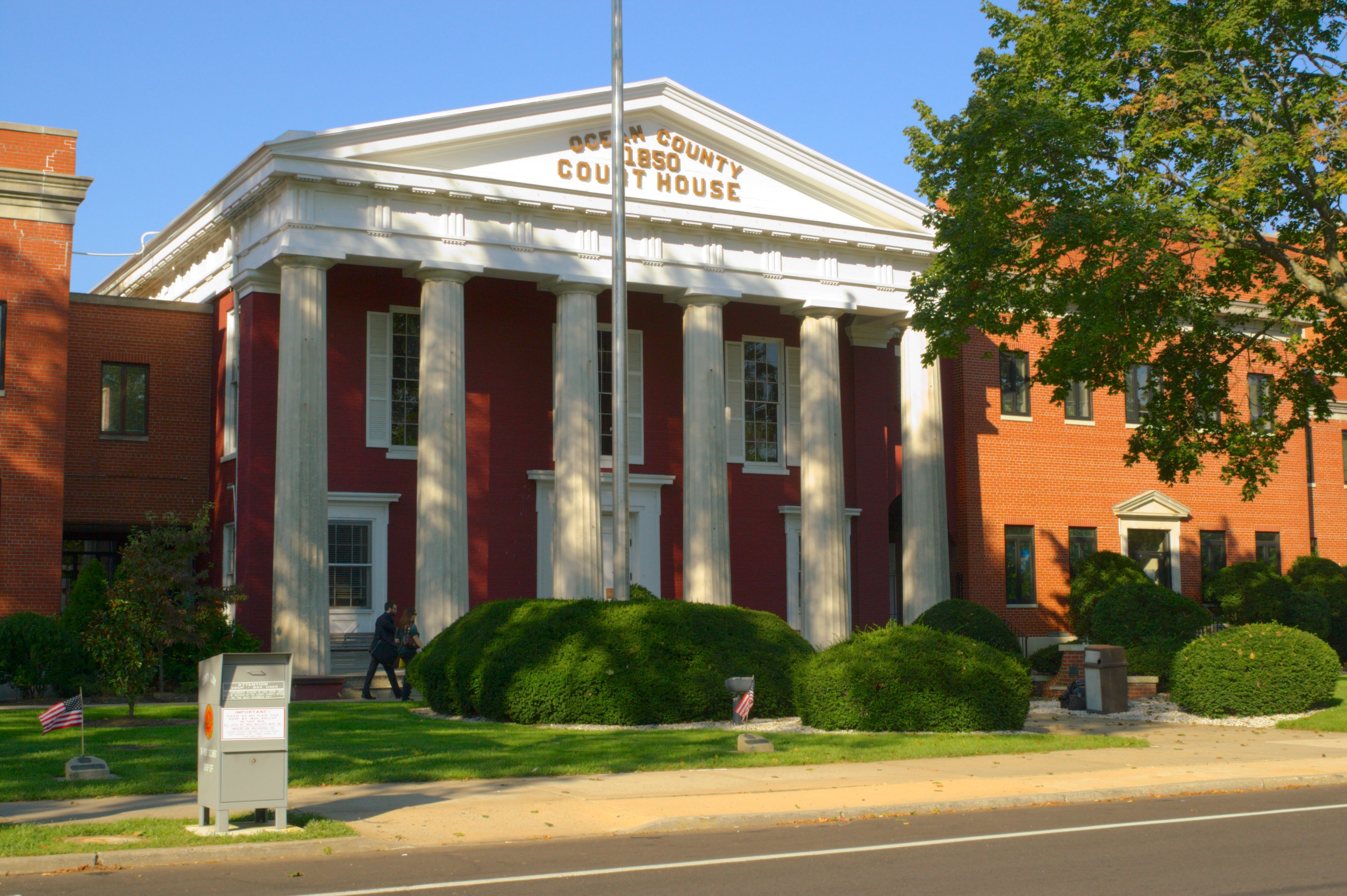
The Ocean County Courthouse in the mainland portion of Toms River was built in 1851.

Toms River is located in the 4th Congressional District and is part of New Jersey's 10th state legislative district.

For the 119th United States Congress, New Jersey's 4th congressional district is represented by Chris Smith (R, Manchester Township). New Jersey is represented in the United States Senate by Democrats Cory Booker (Newark, term ends 2027) and Andy Kim (Moorestown, term ends 2031).

For the 2026–2027 session, the 10th legislative district of the New Jersey Legislature is represented in the State Senate by James W. Holzapfel (R, Toms River) and in the General Assembly by Paul Kanitra (R, Point Pleasant Beach) and Gregory P. McGuckin (R, Toms River).

Ocean County is governed by a Board of County Commissioners composed of five members who are elected on an at-large basis in partisan elections and serving staggered three-year terms of office, with either one or two seats coming up for election each year as part of the November general election. At an annual reorganization held in the beginning of January, the board chooses a director and a deputy director from among its members. As of 2025, Ocean County's Commissioners (with party affiliation, term-end year and residence) are:

John P. Kelly (R, 2025, Eagleswood Township), Virginia E. Haines (R, 2025, Toms River), Robert Arace (R, Manchester Township, 2027) Jennifer Bacchione (R, Berkeley Township, 2027) and Frank Sadeghi (R, 2026, Toms River).

Constitutional officers elected on a countywide basis are: Clerk Scott M. Colabella (R, 2025, Barnegat Light), Sheriff Michael G. Mastronardy (R, 2025; Toms River) and Surrogate Jeffrey Moran (R, 2028, Beachwood).

=== Politics ===
As of November 2023, there were a total of 71,672 registered voters in Toms River Township. Among the township's 2010 Census population, 65.7% (vs. 63.2% in Ocean County) were registered to vote, including 83.6% of those ages 18 and over (vs. 82.6% countywide).

Gubernatorial election results for Toms River
Year	Republican		Democratic		Third party(ies)	
Year	No.	%	No.	%	No.	%
2025	25,319	64.12%	13,987	35.42%	178	0.45%
2021	22,728	69.53%	9,732	29.77%	226	0.69%
2017	15,744	62.31%	8,929	35.34%	593	2.35%
2013	19,317	74.54%	6,269	24.19%	330	1.27%
2009	19,906	67.46%	7,948	26.93%	1,655	5.61%
2005	15,454	56.60%	10,779	39.47%	1,073	3.93%

In the 2016 presidential election, Republican Donald Trump received 64.7% of the vote (28,545 cast), ahead of Democrat Hillary Clinton with 32.4% (14,287 votes), and other candidates with 3.0% (1,315 votes), among the 44,147 ballots cast by the township's voters. In the 2012 presidential election, Republican Mitt Romney received 57.0% of the vote (22,773 cast), ahead of Democrat Barack Obama with 42.0% (16,776 votes), and other candidates with 1.0% (408 votes), among the 40,235 ballots cast by the township's 62,614 registered voters (278 ballots were spoiled), for a turnout of 64.3%. In the 2008 presidential election, Republican John McCain received 57.2% of the vote (25,881 cast), ahead of Democrat Barack Obama with 40.8% (18,439 votes) and other candidates with 1.3% (600 votes), among the 45,215 ballots cast by the township's 62,909 registered voters, for a turnout of 71.9%. In the 2004 presidential election, Republican George W. Bush received 60.7% of the vote (26,203 ballots cast), outpolling Democrat John Kerry with 38.1% (16,467 votes) and other candidates with 0.6% (360 votes), among the 43,170 ballots cast by the township's 59,544 registered voters, for a turnout percentage of 72.5.

Presidential Elections Results
Year	Republican	Democratic	Third Parties
2024	65.4% 33,212	33.0% 13,768	1.6% 683
2020	60.9% 32,778	37.4% 20,142	1.7% 730
2016	64.7% 28,545	32.4% 14,287	3.0% 1,315
2012	57.0% 22,773	42.0% 16,776	1.0% 408
2008	57.2% 25,881	40.8% 18,439	1.3% 600
2004	60.7% 26,203	38.1% 16,467	0.6% 360

In the 2013 gubernatorial election, Republican Chris Christie received 74.5% of the vote (19,317 cast), ahead of Democrat Barbara Buono with 24.2% (6,269 votes), and other candidates with 1.3% (330 votes), among the 26,470 ballots cast by the township's 61,593 registered voters (554 ballots were spoiled), for a turnout of 43.0%. In the 2017 gubernatorial election, Republican Kim Guadagno received 62.3% of the vote (15,744 cast), ahead of Democrat Phil Murphy with 35.3% (8,929 votes), and other candidates with 2.3% (593 votes), among the 25,266 ballots cast by Township's voters. In the 2021 gubernatorial election, of the 32,686 ballots cast by Township voters, Republican Jack Ciattarelli received 69.5% of the vote (22,728 cast), ahead of incumbent Democrat Phil Murphy with 29.8% (9,732 votes), and other candidates with 0.7% (226 votes).

United States Senate election results for Toms River1
Year	Republican		Democratic		Third party(ies)	
Year	No.	%	No.	%	No.	%
2024	29,226	61.97%	17,463	37.03%	471	1.00%
2018	21,841	63.05%	11,665	33.68%	1,133	3.27%
2012	21,326	56.72%	15,600	41.49%	676	1.80%
2006	16,020	59.00%	10,327	38.03%	806	2.97%

United States Senate election results for Toms River2
Year	Republican		Democratic		Third party(ies)	
Year	No.	%	No.	%	No.	%
2020	31,437	60.45%	19,556	37.60%	1,014	1.95%
2014	12,216	59.37%	7,906	38.42%	454	2.21%
2013	9,873	64.01%	5,429	35.20%	123	0.80%
2008	23,535	56.99%	16,961	41.07%	800	1.94%

== Education ==
Students in pre-kindergarten through twelfth grade attend the Toms River Regional Schools, a regional public school system (centered primarily in Toms River Township) that is the largest suburban school district in New Jersey. In addition to students from Toms River, the district also serves the adjoining boroughs of Beachwood, Pine Beach and South Toms River. It is the largest suburban school district in the state, and the fourth largest school district in New Jersey (after Newark, Jersey City and Paterson). It is also the largest school district in the state that is not an Abbott District. As of the 2023–24 school year, the district, composed of 18 schools, had an enrollment of 14,654 students and 1,078.7 classroom teachers (on an FTE basis), for a student–teacher ratio of 13.6:1. Schools in the district (with 2023–24 enrollment data from the National Center for Education Statistics) are Beachwood Elementary School (with 481 students; in grades K–5), Cedar Grove Elementary School (957; PreK–5), Joseph A. Citta Elementary School (522; K–5), East Dover Elementary School (601; PreK–5), Hooper Avenue Elementary School (697; K–5), North Dover Elementary School (386; K–5), Pine Beach Elementary School (384; K–5), Silver Bay Elementary School (604; PreK–5), South Toms River Elementary School (310; K–5), Walnut Street Elementary School (718; K–5), Washington Street Elementary School (337; K–5), West Dover Elementary School (409; K–5), Toms River Intermediate East (1,278; 6–8), Toms River Intermediate North (932; 6–8), Toms River Intermediate South (1,095; 6–8), Toms River High School East (1,444; 9–12), Toms River High School North (1,962; 9–12) and Toms River High School South (1,371; 9–12).

Seats on the district's nine-member board of education are allocated based on the population of the constituent municipalities, with six seats assigned to Toms River.

Donovan Catholic High School, Ocean County's only Catholic high school, operates under the auspices of the Roman Catholic Diocese of Trenton. The diocese also operates St. Joseph's Grade School for students in Kindergarten through 8th grade.

Ocean County College, a two-year college that offers four-year options in cooperation with other New Jersey colleges and universities, is located on Hooper Avenue in Toms River. In May 2014, The Jay and Linda Grunin Foundation announced a $5.7 million donation (equivalent to $8 million in 2025) to establish The Jay and Linda Grunin Center for the Arts, the largest single donation received in OCC's 50-year history.

== Media ==
The Asbury Park Press provides daily news coverage of Toms River Township, as does WOBM-FM radio. The township's government provides columns and commentary to The Toms River Times, which is one of seven weekly papers distributed for free by Micromedia Publications.

WOBM-FM radio started broadcasting from the Bayville section of Berkeley Township in March 1968. The station relocated to studios in Toms River in 2013.

== Infrastructure ==
=== Transportation ===
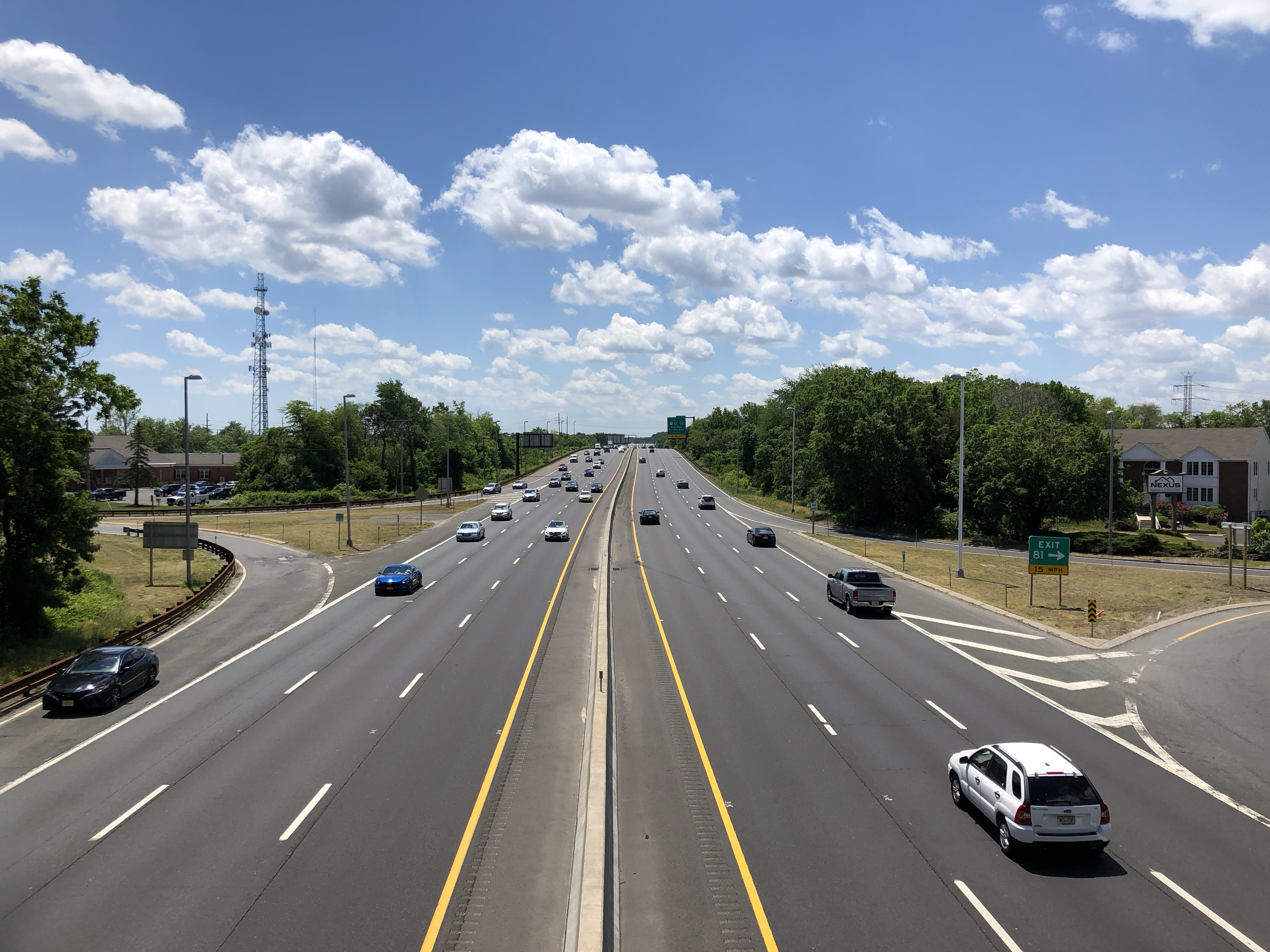
The southbound Garden State Parkway and U.S. Route 9 in Toms River

==== Roads and highways ====
As of May 2010, the township had a total of 453.89 miles (730.47 km) of roadways, of which 351.13 miles (565.09 km) were maintained by the municipality, 72.45 miles (116.60 km) by Ocean County, 24.04 miles (38.69 km) by the New Jersey Department of Transportation and 6.27 miles (10.09 km) by the New Jersey Turnpike Authority.

Toms River is crisscrossed by several major roadways, including the Garden State Parkway and US 9, as well as Route 35, Route 37, Route 70, Route 166, CR 527, CR 530, CR 549 (as well as its spur), and CR 571.

Two of the most congested roads are Hooper Avenue (CR 549) and Route 37, which sees extra traffic from travelers to the Jersey shore during the summertime, due to it being a main artery to the shore from the Garden State Parkway at interchange 82. The township is also home to one of the state's only at-grade cloverleafs, at the intersection of Hooper Avenue (CR 549) and Bay Avenue (CR 571).

The New Jersey Turnpike Authority proposed in 1971 to build the Driscoll Expressway which was to start from exit 80 of the parkway and end 3 miles (4.8 km) north of exit 8A of the New Jersey Turnpike in South Brunswick. This project was killed in 1980.

==== Public transportation ====
Toms River Park & Ride

The major bus station in Toms River is located downtown, off exit 81 of the Garden State Parkway. The township is served by NJ Transit bus routes 67 (to Newark), 137 (to the Port Authority Bus Terminal in Midtown Manhattan), 319 (Port Authority Bus Terminal in New York City and the Atlantic City Bus Terminal), and 559 (to the Atlantic City Bus Terminal). Bus service to the Financial District in Lower Manhattan is also made available via the Academy Bus Lines. Toms River Park & Ride is located in the township off of the Garden State Parkway at exit 81. It is an express route to New York City during peak rush-hour.

Ocean Ride local service is provided on the OC1 Whiting, OC1A Whiting Express, OC2 Manchester, OC3 Brick – Lakewood – Toms River, OC3A Brick – Point Pleasant and the OC10 Toms River Connection routes.

The Central Railroad of New Jersey and Pennsylvania Railroad ended service to the township in the late 1940s. The nearest rail station is the terminus of the North Jersey Coast Line in Bay Head. Service is currently being evaluated to nearby Lakehurst on the proposed Monmouth Ocean Middlesex Line.

The Robert J. Miller Air Park, a public-use airport, is located in Berkeley Township, 5 miles (8.0 km) southwest of the central business district.

=== Health care ===
Community Medical Center, with 587 beds, had been the state's largest non-teaching hospital. Community Medical Center became a teaching hospital in 2021, after being approved by the Accreditation Council for Graduate Medical Education and beginning with a group of 27 residents.

== Community ==
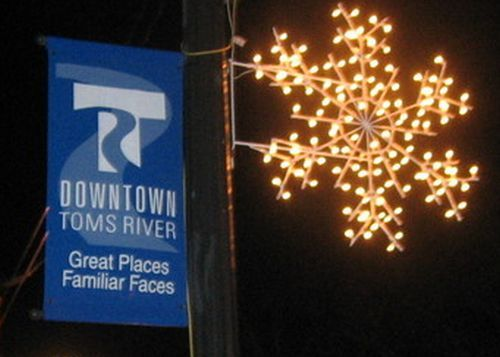
Downtown Toms River during Wintertime

- Toms River has been featured in television, including MTV which filmed three episodes of the show Made and scenes from MTV's Jersey Shore there.
- The toxic dumping that occurred in Toms River in 2001 was the subject of the 2013, Pulitzer Prize winning book Toms River: A Story of Science and Salvation by Dan Fagin.
- Toms River is home to many beaches located along the Jersey Shore, including Ortley Beach, Normandy Beach, Monterey Beach, Ocean Beach, Chadwick Beach, and Silver Beach.
- The New Jersey Chili and Salsa Cook-Off, as well as the New Jersey Ice Cream Festival are held in Toms River.
- The Toms River Branch of Ocean County Library is the headquarters of the Ocean County Library system and the largest public library in Ocean County. In January 2006, a renovation project was completed that doubled the size of the facility.
- Toms River is home to Artisan's Brewery.
- The 1979 movie The Amityville Horror was filmed in Toms River, rather than Amityville on Long Island. Local police and ambulance workers played extras. The Toms River Volunteer Fire Company Number One was used to provide the "rain" during one of the exterior scenes. If you look closely, you can see that it is sunny and not "raining" in the background, the next street over.
- Downtown Toms River hosts many community events, including festivals such as Toms River Pride and the second largest Halloween parade in the world. The official logo is a 'T' with a river, forming an 'R', through it. The slogan is "Great Places. Familiar Faces."
- Toms River gained some notoriety in 1984 when local businessman Robert O. Marshall was charged with (and later convicted of) the contract killing of his wife, Maria. The case attracted the attention of true crime author Joe McGinniss, whose bestselling book on the Marshall case, Blind Faith, was published in 1989 and adapted into an Emmy-nominated 1990 television miniseries starring Robert Urich and Joanna Kerns.
- The Toms River post office also serves South Toms River, parts of Manchester, and parts of Berkeley.

== Notable people ==
People who were born in, residents of, or otherwise closely associated with Toms River include:

- Platt Adams (1885–1961), athlete who won a gold medal in the standing high jump and a silver medal in the standing long jump at the 1912 Summer Olympics in Stockholm
- Corey Albano (born 1975), former professional basketball player
- Rich Alercio (born 1965), college football coach who was head coach of the Castleton Spartans football team
- Casey Bahr (born 1948), soccer defender who played one season in the North American Soccer League and Major Indoor Soccer League, and was a member of the U.S. soccer team at the 1972 Summer Olympics
- Darian Barnes (born 1980), former NFL fullback
- Alex Blackwell (born 1970), former NBA forward for the Los Angeles Lakers
- Carolyn Blank (born 1988), retired soccer player who played for Sky Blue FC
- Rachel Bolan (born 1966), bass guitar player and main songwriter of the metal band Skid Row
- Tom Brown Jr. (1950–2024), naturalist, tracker, survivalist and author
- Don Browne (1943–2023), media executive who was president of Telemundo following a tenure at NBC News
- Mike Bucci (born 1972), semi-retired professional wrestler best known for his appearances in Extreme Championship Wrestling as Nova, Super Nova, and "Hollywood" Nova, and in World Wrestling Entertainment as Simon Dean
- Andrew Campbell (born 1984), yachtsman who represented the United States in Laser sailing competition at the 2008 Summer Olympics
- Sean Cashman (born 1987), baseball coach in the Texas Rangers organization who was head coach of the Saint Peter's Peacocks during the 2013 season
- Michael Chack (born 1971), former competitive figure skater who finished third at the U.S. Figure Skating Championships in 1993
- Syma Chowdhry, television news reporter in Philadelphia at KYW-TV
- Danny Clinch (born 1964), photographer
- Chris Connor (1927–2009), jazz singer
- Christopher J. Connors (born 1956), member of the New Jersey Senate since 2008, where he represents the 9th Legislative District
- John Cudia (born 1970), Broadway actor and singer
- Marguerite de Angeli (1889–1987), writer and illustrator of children's books including the 1950 Newbery Award winning book The Door in the Wall
- Jerry Dipoto (born 1968), former professional baseball player and an executive who is the general manager of the Seattle Mariners
- Ryan Doherty (born 1984), professional beach volleyball player who had been the first seven-foot-tall player in Minor League Baseball history
- Kyle Driscoll (born 1994), professional baseball coach and former pitcher who is an assistant pitching coach for the St. Louis Cardinals
- Howard Dvorkin (born 1965), chairman of debt.com, author and businessman
- Frankie Edgar (born 1981), former UFC Lightweight Champion
- Lew Elverson (1912–1997), college football player and coach, track and field coach, and college athletics administrator
- JP Flavin (born 1998) long-distance runner
- Jazmyn Foberg (born 2000), artistic gymnast who was the 2014 US Junior National All-Around and Uneven Bars Champion
- Marlene Lynch Ford (born 1954), politician, prosecutor and jurist who served in the New Jersey General Assembly
- Jeff Frazier (born 1982), former professional baseball player for the Detroit Tigers and Chicago Cubs, brother of Todd Frazier
- Todd Frazier (born 1986), professional baseball player for the New York Mets, 34th overall draft pick in the 2007 Major League Baseball draft, brother of Jeff Frazier, Olympic silver medalist
- Julio M. Fuentes (born 1946), Senior United States circuit judge of the United States Court of Appeals for the Third Circuit, who is the first Hispanic judge to serve the Third Circuit
- Mia Galeotalanza, contestant on Survivor: Vanuatu
- Brian Geraghty (born 1974), actor, We Are Marshall (2006), The Guardian (2006), Bobby (2006) Jarhead (2005) and Chicago P.D. (2014)
- Jared Gertner, stage actor who played a co-starring role in the first touring and London productions of The Book of Mormon
- Frank Giannetti (born 1968), defensive tackle who played in the NFL who played for the Indianapolis Colts
- Ted Gillen (born 1968), former professional soccer player
- Erin Gleason (born 1977), short track speed skater who competed in three events at the 1998 Winter Olympics
- Melissa Gorga (born 1979), reality television personality, author, singer, designer and businesswoman, who joined the cast of The Real Housewives of New Jersey in its third season
- Alf Goullet (1891–1995), Australian-born cyclist who won more than 400 races on three continents, including 15 six-day races
- Bob Grant (1929–2013), radio host
- Sheree Gray (born 1985), soccer defender who represents Sky Blue FC of Women's Professional Soccer
- Lori Grifa, attorney who served as Commissioner of the New Jersey Department of Community Affairs from 2010 to 2012
- Tom Guiry (born 1981), actor who is best known for his lead performance in the cult coming-of-age film The Sandlot
- Virginia E. Haines (born 1946), politician who serves on the Ocean County Board of Chosen Freeholders and had served in the New Jersey General Assembly from 1992 to 1994 and as executive director of the New Jersey Lottery from 1994 to 2002
- Brian Hanlon, master sculptor and founder of Hanlon Sculpture Studio, specializing in bronze sculptures
- Judith Hird (c. 1946), ordained as the pastor of the Holy Cross Lutheran Church in Toms River in 1972, making her the first woman pastor of a Lutheran church
- James W. Holzapfel (born 1944), member of the New Jersey State Senate from the 10th Legislative District
- Anthony W. Ivins (1852–1934), an apostle of the Church of Jesus Christ of Latter-day Saints (LDS Church) and a member of the church's First Presidency from 1921 until his death
- Jeff Janiak (born 1976), vocalist of the punk rock band Discharge
- Marty Jannetty (born 1962), professional wrestler, best known as one-half of The Rockers in the World Wrestling Federation
- Gary Jobson (born c. 1951, class of 1969), sailor, television commentator and author who is editor at-large of Sailing World and Cruising World magazines and president of the National Sailing Hall of Fame
- Pavle Jovanovic (born 1977), Olympic bobsled competitor
- Chris Konopka (born 1985), MLS player for the Philadelphia Union
- Stephenie LaGrossa Kendrick (born 1979), contestant on Survivor: Palau, Survivor: Guatemala and Survivor: Heroes vs. Villains, under the Heroes tribe
- Al Leiter (born 1965), former Major League Baseball player who pitched for both the New York Mets and New York Yankees
- Mark Leiter (born 1963), former Major League Baseball player
- Mark Leiter Jr. (born 1991), pitcher for the New York Yankees
- Shulem Lemmer (born 1990), singer and entertainer
- Leonard Lomell (1919–2011), U.S. Army Ranger who destroyed German gun emplacements on D-Day
- Tom MacArthur (born 1960), businessman and politician who was the member of the United States House of Representatives for New Jersey's 3rd congressional district from 2015 to 2019
- Gia Maione (1941–2013), singer and wife of singer Louis Prima
- Ron Marinaccio (born 1995), professional baseball pitcher for the New York Yankees
- Robert O. Marshall (1939–2015), businessman whose 1980s conviction for the contract murder of his wife was the subject of a controversial 1989 book and 1990 television miniseries
- Demetri Martin (born 1973), comedian, featured on The Daily Show and Comedy Central Presents
- Thomas A. Mathis (1869–1958), politician who served in the New Jersey Senate and was the Secretary of State of New Jersey from 1931 to 1941
- W. Steelman Mathis (1898–1981), politician who served in the New Jersey Senate from 1941 to 1942 and again from 1947 to 1966
- Gregory P. McGuckin (born 1961), politician and former Toms River council member who has served in the New Jersey General Assembly, representing the 10th Legislative District since 2012
- Robert and Michael Meeropol (born 1947 and 1943, respectively), sons of convicted spies Julius and Ethel Rosenberg
- Tony Meola (born 1969), former soccer goalkeeper who represented the United States men's national soccer team at the 1990, 1994, and 2002 World Cups, and from 1996 to 2006 played in Major League Soccer
- Andy Messersmith (born 1945), former MLB pitcher who played for the California Angels (1968–1972), Los Angeles Dodgers (1973–1975 and 1979), Atlanta Braves (1976–1977) and the New York Yankees (1978)
- Kurt Metzger (born 1977), stand-up comedian, actor, writer, producer known for on Inside Amy Schumer
- Annette Meyers (born 1934), mystery novelist
- Joe Michelini (born 1988) musician, singer, songwriter and frontman for the indie/folk rock band River City Extension
- Jane Moffet (1930–2018), former utility player who played from 1949 through 1952 in the All-American Girls Professional Baseball League
- Steve Mormando (born 1955), fencer who competed in the individual and team sabre events at the 1984, 1988 and 1992 Summer Olympics
- Rocco Neri (1919–2011), politician who represented the 28th Legislative District in the New Jersey General Assembly from 1974 to 1976
- Beth Simone Noveck (born 1971), New Jersey's first Chief Innovation Officer
- Sergey Padyukov (1922–1993), architect, engineer, sculptor and human rights activist, best known for his work designing churches and other houses of worship
- Scott Palguta (born 1982), head men's soccer coach at Colorado College who played for the Colorado Rapids of Major League Soccer
- Piper Perabo (born 1976), stage, film, and television actress who has her breakthrough role in the 2000 film Coyote Ugly
- Ruth Polsky (1954–1986), pioneering booker and music promoter
- Sam Porcello (c. 1936–2012), food scientist who developed the Oreo cookie's creme filling
- Christie Raleigh Crossley (born 1987), Paralympic swimmer who will represent the United States at the 2024 Summer Paralympics
- Maria Ressa, Filipino-American journalist, author, 2021 Nobel Peace Prize winner, and co-founder of Rappler
- Charles E. Rosendahl (1892–1977), Admiral in the United States Navy, who was commanding officer of Lakehurst Naval Air Station
- John F. Russo (1933–2017), former politician who served in the New Jersey Senate and was Senate President
- Norton A. Schwartz (born 1951), retired United States Air Force general who served as the 19th Chief of Staff of the Air Force from 2008 until his retirement in 2012
- Joe Scott (born 1965), former men's head basketball coach for the United States Air Force Academy and Princeton University; current head coach at University of Denver
- Jason Snelling (born 1983), NFL running back for the Atlanta Falcons
- Mike Solana, American writer and conservative commentator.
- Cheryl Spector (1958–2007), LGBT activist
- William N. Stape (born 1968), storywriter and magazine writer who devised two story ideas for Star Trek: The Next Generation and Star Trek: Deep Space Nine
- Keith Stokes (born 1978), professional Canadian and American football wide receiver
- Noël Valis (born 1945), writer, scholar and translator who is a professor of Spanish at Yale University
- Albert W. Van Duzer (1917–1999), bishop of the Episcopal Diocese of New Jersey, serving from 1973 to 1982
- Nick Werkman, former basketball player for the Seton Hall Pirates who set the team record for career points with 2,273

== See also ==
- Toms River CDP, New Jersey
- Dover Beaches North, New Jersey
- Dover Beaches South, New Jersey
- USS Randolph (CV-15) § Decommissioning
