= Ocean County Mall =

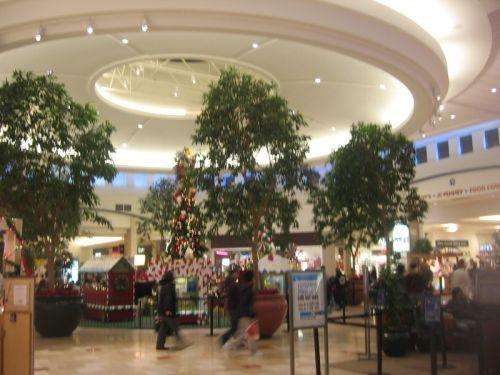
- Center court during Christmas 2006
- Location: Toms River, New Jersey, United States
- Coordinates: 39.98054°N 74.17780°W
- Opened: July 28, 1976
- Developer: Edward J. DeBartolo Corporation and Corporate Property Investors
- Manager: Simon Property Group
- Owner: Simon Property Group
- Num. of stores: 105
- Num. of anchor tenants: 5
- Floor area: 791,125 sq ft (73,497.9 m^{2})
- Floors: 1 (2 in anchors)
- Parking: Parking lot
- Public transit: NJ Transit bus: 67; Ocean Ride bus: OC 10, OC 1, OC 1A, OC 2, OC 3A
- Website: simon.com/mall/ocean-county-mall

Ocean County Mall is a super-regional mall, opened On July 28, 1976, by the Edward J. DeBartolo Corporation and Corporate Property Investors, located in Toms River, New Jersey on Hooper Avenue (County Route 549). The mall is accessible from Exit 82 of the Garden State Parkway via Route 37 East. The mall is managed by Simon Property Group. The mall has a gross leasable area of 791,125 sq ft (73,497.9 m^{2}).

The mall is anchored by Boscov's, JCPenney, and Macy's. The center went under development in 2019 bringing national retail and restaurant tenants like ULTA Beauty, On The Border, P.F. Chang's, HomeSense, and more. It also contains several eateries and a food court. Ocean County Mall is the only enclosed mall in Ocean County. It is a popular destination for tourists in the Toms River area during the summer season.

== History ==
In the 1970s, the Toms River area, although growing quickly, was still relatively rural. The closest malls were Monmouth Mall in Eatontown, and Shore Mall in Egg Harbor Township. With the growing need for an enclosed mall, the mall was originally planned to be at the intersection of Route 37 and the Garden State Parkway. Ocean County Mall was a joint-venture between the Edward J. DeBartolo Corporation and Corporate Property Investors, of New York. Sears opened on July 19, 1976. Ocean County Mall opened for business on July 28, 1976. The mall opened with 55 of the 92 stores and 2 of the 3 anchors. Open anchors at the time included JCPenney and Sears. Bamberger's opened on March 10, 1977, before being converted to Macy's in 1986. General Cinema, which joined the mall as Cinemagic Theatres in January 1998, closed on October 24, 2002. It sat vacant until 2007 when it was replaced by a Japanese restaurant.

In 1988, a small expansion was built which included a Stern's. The store closed in 2001, when the chain was folded. The space was taken over by Boscov’s. Around the same time, the General Cinema quietly closed down due to competition from the AMC-Loews across the street at Seacourt Pavilion. The Cinema's main mall entrance near Applebee's was sealed off for years (now a Japanese restaurant, Ichiban), while the small side hallway near Sears remained locked and dark.

In 2003, the mall received a complete renovation, which added new signage, flooring, lighting, seating areas, and lighting in the parking lot. The renovation was partially sponsored by the Deborah Heart and Lung Center, which donated seating & lounge areas, in part to encourage mall walking. To accommodate, there is a stretch of discolored tile around the perimeter of the mall with numbers engraved marking walking distance.

On January 4, 2018, it was announced that the Sears would be closing in early April of that year as part of a plan to close 103 stores nationwide.

Sears closed on April 8, 2018. Simon redeveloped the space to include more retail, restaurants, and fitness by 2020. In December 2019, LA Fitness opened in part of the Sears space. Five Below opened in July 2020. In September 2020, Ulta Beauty opened. HomeSense opened in December 2020.

== Anchors ==
- Macy's – 2 floors, formerly Bamberger's
- Boscov's – 2 floors, formerly Stern's
- JCPenney – 2 floors, original anchor
