= Blind Faith (miniseries) =

- 1994 VHS cover
- Genre: Thriller
- Based on: Blind Faith by Joe McGinniss
- Screenplay by: John Gay
- Story by: Joe McGinniss
- Directed by: Paul Wendkos
- Starring: Robert Urich; Joanna Kerns; David Barry Gray; Jay Underwood; Johnny Galecki
- Theme music composer: Laurence Rosenthal
- Country of origin: United States
- Original language: English

Production
- Executive producers: Susan Baerwald; Dan Wigutow
- Cinematography: Chuck Arnold
- Editors: Christopher Cooke; James Galloway
- Running time: 190 minutes
- Production company: NBC Productions

Original release
- Network: NBC
- Release: February 11 – February 13, 1990

Blind Faith is a 1990 NBC miniseries based on the 1989 true crime book of the same name by Joe McGinniss. It follows the 1984 case in which American businessman Robert O. Marshall was charged with (and later convicted of) the contract killing of his wife, Maria. Adapted by John Gay and directed by Paul Wendkos, the miniseries was originally broadcast in two parts with a total runtime of 190 minutes.

The cast includes Robert Urich, Joanna Kerns, Doris Roberts, Johnny Galecki, William Forsythe and Dennis Farina.

== Plot ==
In Toms River, New Jersey, the Marshalls — Rob (Urich) and Maria (Kerns), and their three sons, 18-year-old Roby (David Barry Gray), 17-year-old Chris (Jay Underwood) and 12-year-old John (Johnny Galecki) — are a seemingly happy family living the American Dream. But in September 1984, Maria is shot and killed, and Rob claims she was murdered by a robber while he was changing a flat tire. When the police commence their investigation, however, they discover unsettling truths about the Marshalls: Rob has secretly accumulated an enormous debt and secured a second mortgage of $100,000 in Maria's name, and is having an affair with a married neighbor, Felice Richmond (Robin Strasser). Maria had known of the affair and had considered divorce, but decided to work on their marriage shortly before she was killed.

Felice gives the police a statement that Rob wanted to get rid of his wife to collect on her life insurance, and he immediately becomes the prime suspect. At first, Rob's friends and family support him. But they begin to notice that he does not seem to be in mourning over Maria's death, and Rob's best friend Sal (Joe Spano) is angry that he is more interested in building a future with Felice. Rob is advised by his lawyer not to contact Felice because it could influence his image; this troubles Rob, who is deeply in love with her. Meanwhile, the police have expanded their list of suspects to include Andrew Meyers (Jake Dengel), a Louisiana shop clerk who had contact with Rob concerning his financial problems, and Arnie Eggers, a rumored hitman.

As evidence mounts against Rob, Felice breaks off their relationship, which leads him to unsuccessfully attempt suicide in a motel. By this point, Chris admits that he suspects his father might be guilty. Roby and John are both shocked to hear this, strongly believing in his innocence. Rob admits to Sal that he hired Ferlin L'Heureux (William Forsythe), a private detective, on the night his wife was killed to find out how he lost all of his money. Roby, upset with a recent newspaper article in which his mother's personal life has been attacked, is almost involved in a car accident. The police find an audiotape Rob recorded shortly before his suicide attempt in which he talks about L'Hereux, who in turn claims that Ricky Dunlap (David Andrews) was the man hired to murder Maria. On Christmas Eve, Rob is arrested. Roby visits him in jail and is assured by his father that he is not guilty.

The trial begins at the Atlantic County courthouse in 1986. L'Hereux gives detailed testimony in which he claims that Rob hired him to murder Maria so that he could collect on her insurance. L'Hereux states that he found her too beautiful to kill, and contacted Dunlap to finish the job. Under extreme pressure from the trial, Roby and John are unable to hide their emotions, and Chris turns into an angry young man wanting justice to be served. When the moment comes that Rob asks Roby to give false testimony which would provide him an alibi, it becomes clear to Roby that his father is not the person he thought him to be.

Dunlap is found not guilty. The entire blame goes to Rob, disparaged by prosecuting attorney Kelly (Dennis Farina) as "a legend in his own mind" whom he considers many times worse than Dunlap, even if he was not the one who performed the actual murder. Rob is sentenced to death by lethal injection. The narration reveals that, as of 1990, Rob is on death row waiting for appeal; Roby finished college; Chris became a varsity swim coach; and John, who married at age 17, never stopped believing in his father's innocence.

== Cast ==
- Robert Urich as Robert O. Marshall
- Joanna Kerns as Maria Marshall
- David Barry Gray as Roby Marshall
- Jay Underwood as Chris Marshall
- Johnny Galecki as John Marshall
- Dennis Farina as Prosecutor Kelly
- Joe Spano as Sal Caccaro
- Doris Roberts as Tessie McBride
- Robin Strasser as Felice Richmond
- William Forsythe as Ferlin L'Hereux
- Guy Boyd as Seely
- Dakin Matthews as Uncle Gene
- David Andrews as Ricky Dunlap
- Gordon Clapp as Detective O'Brien
- Jake Dengel as Andrew "Andy" Meyers
- Kevin Dunn as Lieutenant Gladstone
- Mary-Joan Negro as Paula Caccaro
- Toad Bunglegreen as Carl O'Brien
- Jack Angeles as Hall

== Production and release ==
Based on the 1989 true crime book Blind Faith by Joe McGinniss, production for the miniseries was announced in October 1989. The miniseries was initially broadcast in two parts, premiering on February 11, 1990. It was adapted by John Gay and directed by Paul Wendkos, with a total runtime of 190 minutes.

Blind Faith was nominated in 1990 for a Primetime Emmy Award for Outstanding Miniseries, Outstanding Art Direction for a Miniseries or a Special (for part II), Outstanding Achievement in Hairstyling for a Miniseries or a Special (for part I) and Outstanding Editing for a Miniseries or a Special - Single Camera Production (for part II). It was also nominated in 1991 for an ACE Eddie award for Best Edited Episode from a Television Mini-Series (for part II).

During filming, Joanna Kerns became very close with Robert and Maria Marshall's eldest son, Roby Marshall, who served as a consultant on the miniseries. It was through that relationship that Roby met actress Tracey Gold, who had costarred with Kerns on the TV series Growing Pains. Marshall and Gold married in 1994 and are currently raising four sons together.

A 185 minute version was released on VHS in 1992. As of June 2025, there has been no DVD or Blu-ray release.

== See also ==
- Robert O. Marshall
- Fatal Vision (miniseries)
- Cruel Doubt
