= Toms River (CDP), New Jersey =

Populated place in Ocean County, New Jersey, US

Toms River, New Jersey
- Census-designated place
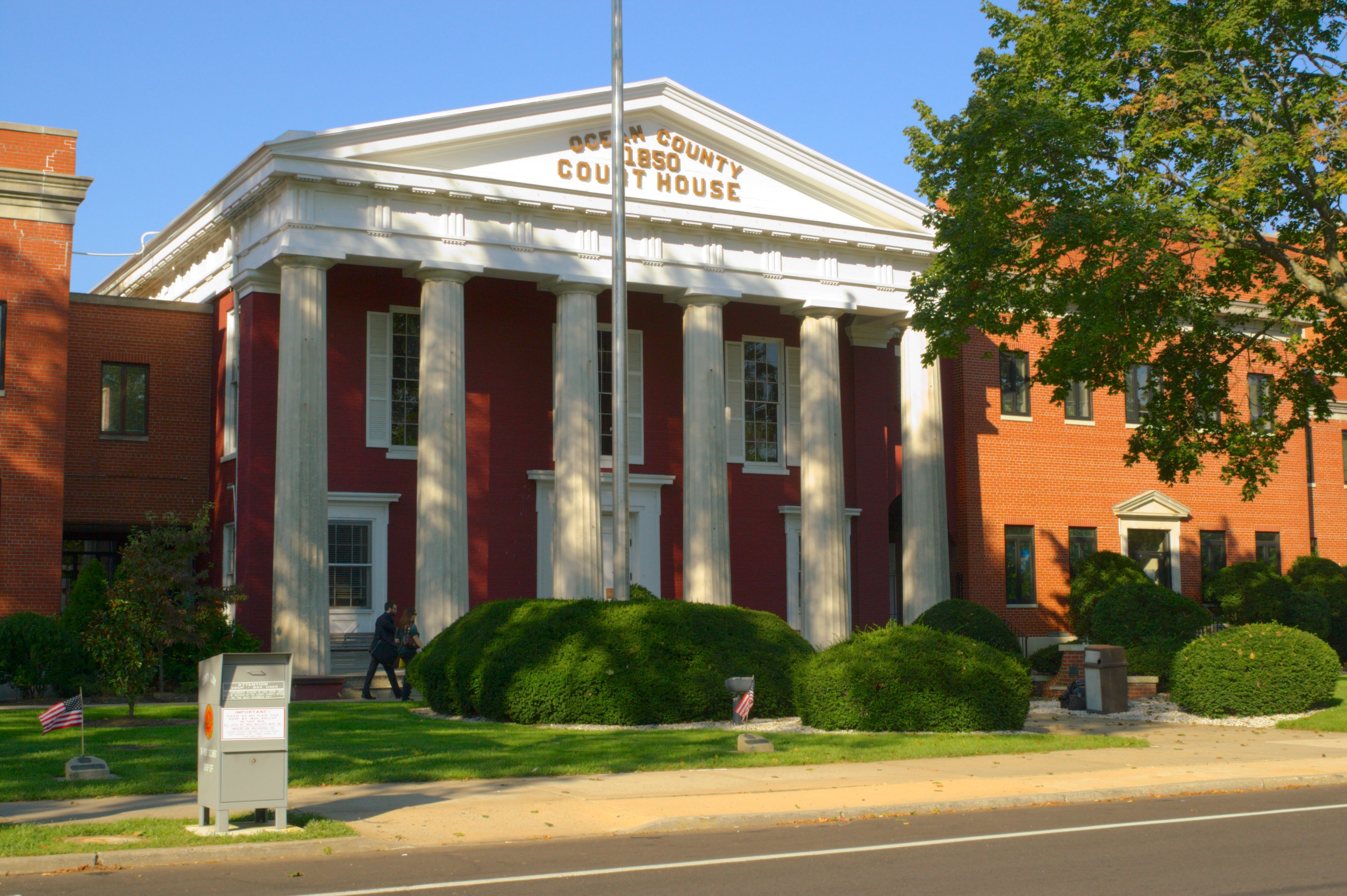
- The Ocean County Courthouse in Toms River was built in 1851.

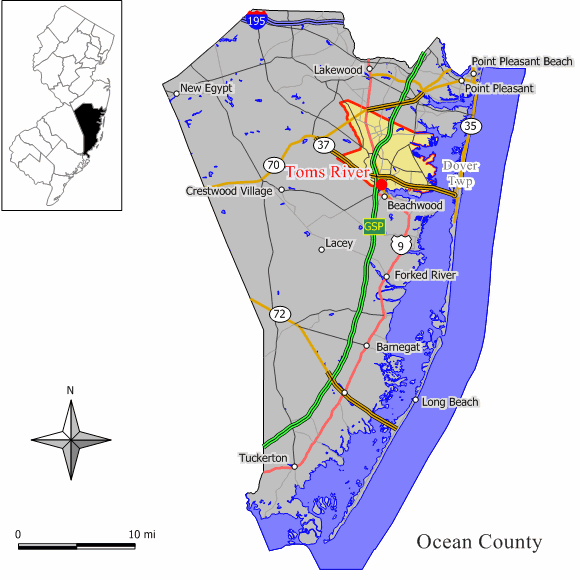
- Map of Toms River CDP in Ocean County. Inset: Location of Ocean County in New Jersey.

- Location in Ocean County Location in New Jersey Location in the United States
- Coordinates: 39.994856°N 74.187754°W
- Country: United States
- State: New Jersey
- County: Ocean
- Township: Toms River

Area
  - Total: 40.54 sq mi (105.00 km^{2})
  - Land: 39.00 sq mi (101.00 km^{2})
  - Water: 1.54 sq mi (4.00 km^{2}) 4.40%
- Elevation: 62 ft (19 m)

Population (2020)
  - Total: 92,830
  - Density: 2,380.7/sq mi (919.2/km^{2})
- Time zone: UTC−05:00 (Eastern (EST))
  - Summer (DST): UTC−04:00 (Eastern (EDT))
- ZIP Codes: 08753-08757
- Area codes: 732/848
- FIPS code: 34-73110
- GNIS feature ID: 02390394

Toms River is an unincorporated community and census-designated place (CDP) located within and constituting the mainland portion of Toms River Township (formerly Dover Township), in Ocean County, in the U.S. state of New Jersey. As of the 2020 United States census, the CDP's population was 92,830, its highest decennial count ever and an increase of 4,039 (+4.5%) from the 88,791 recorded at the 2010 census, which in turn reflected an increase of 2,464 (+2.9%) from the 86,327 counted in the 2000 census. The Toms River CDP is the county seat of Ocean County. The area is named for Toms River, whose estuary flows through the community and empties into Barnegat Bay.

Toms River Township and its fully contained census-designated place are not co-extensive. In addition to the census-designated place, which includes all of mainland Toms River Township and is home to the vast majority of the township's population, Toms River Township includes two small CDPs: Dover Beaches North (2020 Census population of 1,277) and Dover Beaches South (1,331), both of which are located on the Barnegat Peninsula. As defined by the Census Bureau based on 2010 Census data, more than 96% of Toms River Township's area and of its population of 95,438 was located in Toms River CDP.

== Geography ==
According to the United States Census Bureau, the CDP had a total area of 40.738 square miles (105.51 km^{2}), including 38.947 square miles (100.87 km^{2}) of land and 1.791 square miles (4.64 km^{2}) of water (4.40%).

== Demographics ==
Historical population
Census	Pop.	Note	%±
1950	2,517		—
1960	6,062		140.8%
1970	7,303		20.5%
1980	7,465		2.2%
1990	7,524		0.8%
2000	86,327		1,047.4%
2010	88,791		2.9%
2020	92,830		4.5%
Population sources: 1950; 1960-1970 1960-1980 1990-2010; 2000 2010 2020

Toms River was listed as an unincorporated community in the 1950 U.S. census; and then as a census designated place in the 1980 U.S. census.

=== 2010 census ===
The 2010 United States census counted 88,791 people, 33,394 households, and 23,643 families in the CDP. The population density was 2,279.8 people per square mile (880.2 people/km^{2}). There were 36,605 housing units at an average density of 939.9 units per square mile (362.9 units/km^{2}). The racial makeup was 89.71% (79,653) White, 2.77% (2,459) Black or African American, 0.17% (151) Native American, 3.67% (3,260) Asian, 0.02% (17) Pacific Islander, 1.98% (1,760) from other races, and 1.68% (1,491) from two or more races. Hispanic or Latino of any race were 8.04% (7,136) of the population.

Of the 33,394 households, 29.0% had children under the age of 18; 54.9% were married couples living together; 11.9% had a female householder with no husband present and 29.2% were non-families. Of all households, 24.3% were made up of individuals and 11.7% had someone living alone who was 65 years of age or older. The average household size was 2.62 and the average family size was 3.12.

21.7% of the population were under the age of 18, 8.0% from 18 to 24, 24.1% from 25 to 44, 29.5% from 45 to 64, and 16.7% who were 65 years of age or older. The median age was 42.5 years. For every 100 females, the population had 92.4 males. For every 100 females ages 18 and older there were 89.6 males.

=== 2000 census ===
As of the 2000 United States census there were 86,327 people, 31,674 households, and 23,470 families living in the CDP. The population density was 846.6 people/km^{2} (2,193 people/mi^{2}). There were 34,375 housing units at an average density of 337.1 units/km^{2} (873 units/mi^{2}). The racial makeup of the CDP was 93.36% White, 1.81% African American, 0.13% Native American, 2.54% Asian, 0.02% Pacific Islander, 0.98% from other races, and 1.15% from two or more races. Hispanic or Latino of any race were 4.65% of the population.

There were 31,674 households, out of which 32.3% had children under the living with them, 60.1% were married couples living together, 10.7% had a female householder with no husband present, and 25.9% were non-families. 21.5% of all households were made up of individuals, and 10.4% had someone living alone who was 65 years of age or older. The average household size was 2.66 and the average family size was 3.11.

In the CDP the population was spread out, with 23.8% under the age of 18, 7.3% from 18 to 24, 27.4% from 25 to 44, 24.8% from 45 to 64, and 16.6% who were 65 years of age or older. The median age was 40 years. For every 100 females, there were 92.7 males. For every 100 females age 18 and over, there were 89.0 males.

The median income for a household in the CDP was $55,659, and the median income for a family was $62,971. Males had a median income of $47,448 versus $30,763 for females. The per capita income for the CDP was $24,831. 5.6% of the population and 4.0% of families were below the poverty line. 6.6% of those under the age of 18 and 6.2% of those 65 and older were living below the poverty line.
