= Toms River =

Freshwater river and estuary in New Jersey, US

Toms River Goose Neck Creek, Goose Creek, Toms Creek
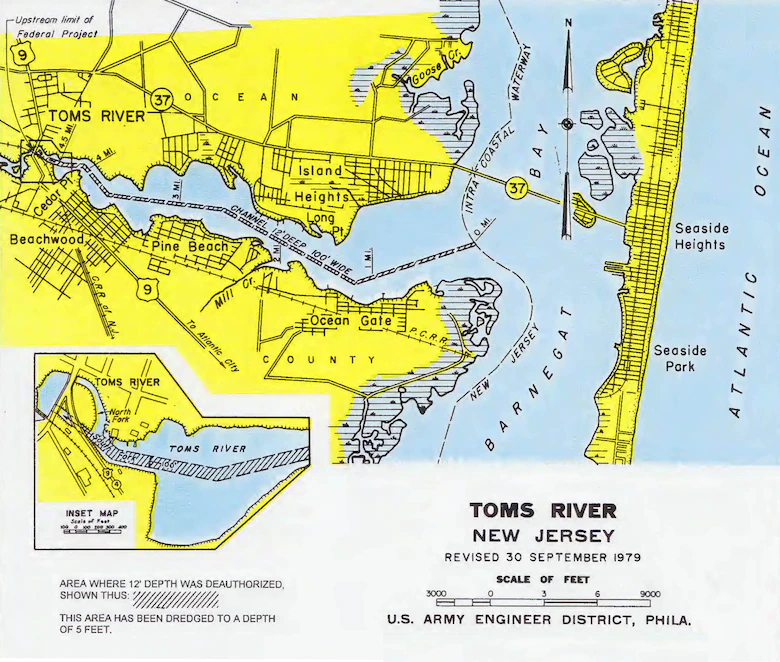
- Toms River Project, US Army Corps of Engineers, 1979

- Location within New Jersey

Location
- Country: United States
- State: New Jersey
- Municipality: Toms River, New Jersey

Physical characteristics
- Source
  - location: Millstone Township, New Jersey
  - coordinates: 40.19746°N 74.41973°W
  - elevation: 226 feet (69 m)
- Mouth
  - location: Toms River, New Jersey
  - coordinates: 39.93880°N 74.11201°W
- Width
  - maximum: 1.08 miles (1.74 km) at mouth
- Discharge
  - location: 39.987°N 74.223°W
  - average: 191 cu ft/s (5.4 m^{3}/s)
  - minimum: 37 cu ft/s (1.0 m^{3}/s)
  - maximum: 3,940 cu ft/s (112 m^{3}/s)

Basin features
- Cities: Millstone Township, Freehold Township, Jackson Township, Manchester Township, Berkeley Township, Toms River, South Toms River, Beachwood, Pine Beach, Island Heights, Ocean Gate
- Waterbodies: Lake Hohenstein, Barnegat Bay

The Toms River is a 41.7-mile-long (67.1 km) freshwater river and estuary in Ocean County, New Jersey, United States. The river rises in the Pine Barrens of northern Ocean County, then flows southeast and east, where it is fed by several tributaries, and flows in a meandering course through wetlands. The river empties into Barnegat Bay—an inlet of the Atlantic Ocean—and the Intracoastal Waterway at Mile 14.6.

== Geography ==
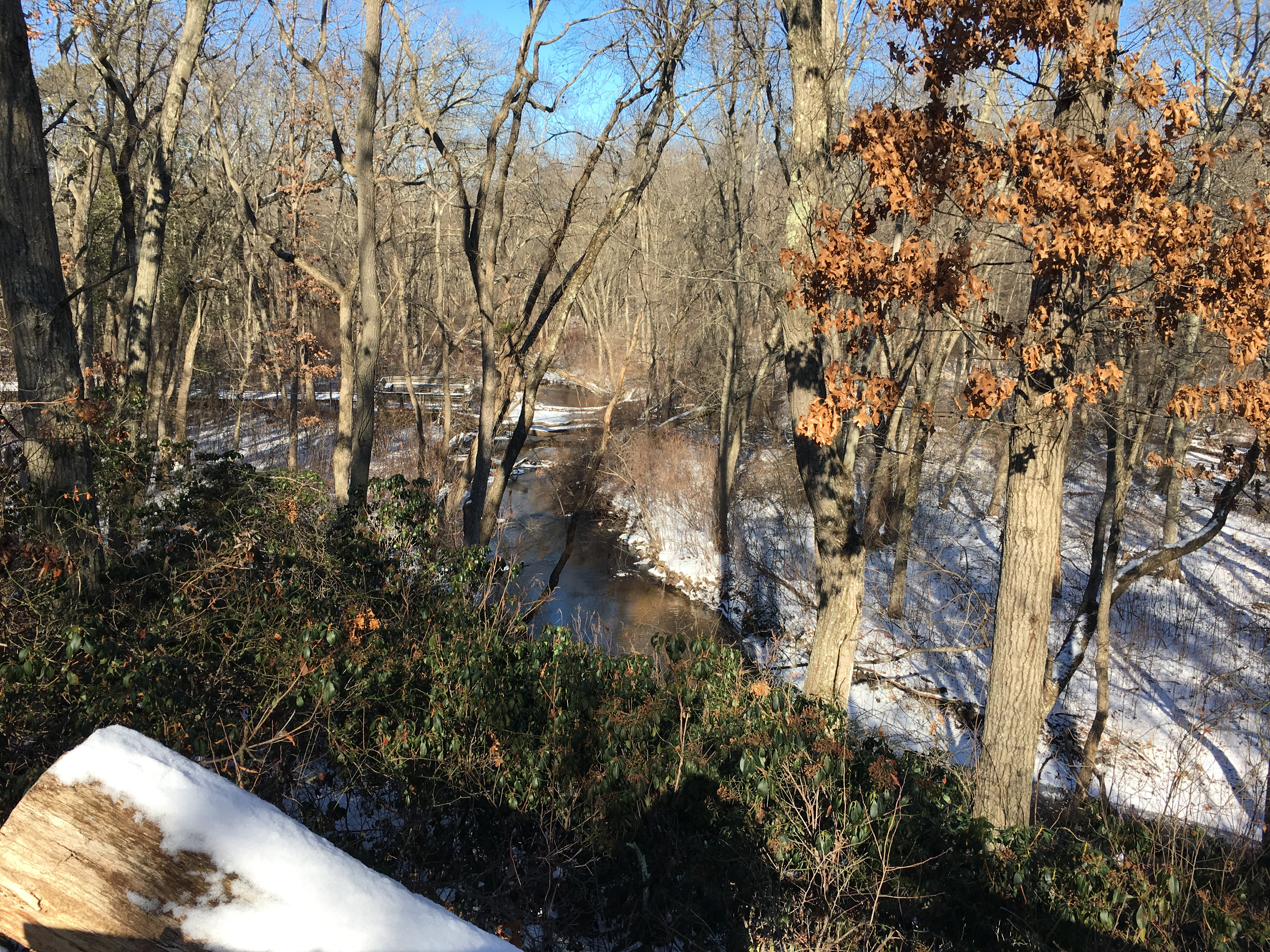
The Toms River as it appears upstream in Jackson Township

Much of the headwaters of the Toms River are in the New Jersey Pine Barrens. The lower 5 miles (8.0 km) of the river is a broad tidal estuary that is navigable within the community of Toms River. The river empties into the western side of Barnegat Bay, with mid-channel depths of 3.5 to 5 feet (1.1 to 1.5 m).

At 124 sq mi (320 km^{2}), the Toms River subwatershed is the largest drainage area of any river in the Barnegat Bay watershed. It includes 11 municipalities in Ocean County and portions of southwestern Monmouth County. The lowest sections of the river provide convenient locations for marinas and yacht clubs, and bases for fishing and crabbing. Canoeing and kayaking are also popular on the river, which can be paddled for 21.7 miles (34.9 km) from Don Connor Boulevard, below County Route 528 to Barnegat Bay.

== History ==
The Toms River has appeared on maps of the region since the New Netherland colony, although it has not always been named. The earliest-known written reference to it is from 1687. Into the late 1700s, it was most-often referred to as Goose Creek or Goose Neck Creek. Post-colonial cartographers switched between 'Goose Creek—as seen on Thomas Jefferys' 1776 map and Aaron Arrowsmith's 1804 map— and Toms Creek, as in Mathew Carey's 1795 State Map of New Jersey. The cartographers Henry Charles Carey and Isaac Lea attempted to address any confusion by choosing "Goose or Toms Cr." in their 1814 map.

In 1822, Carey and Lea co-published another map that entirely removed the name Goose Creek. Subsequent maps would use the name Toms River.

== Etymology ==
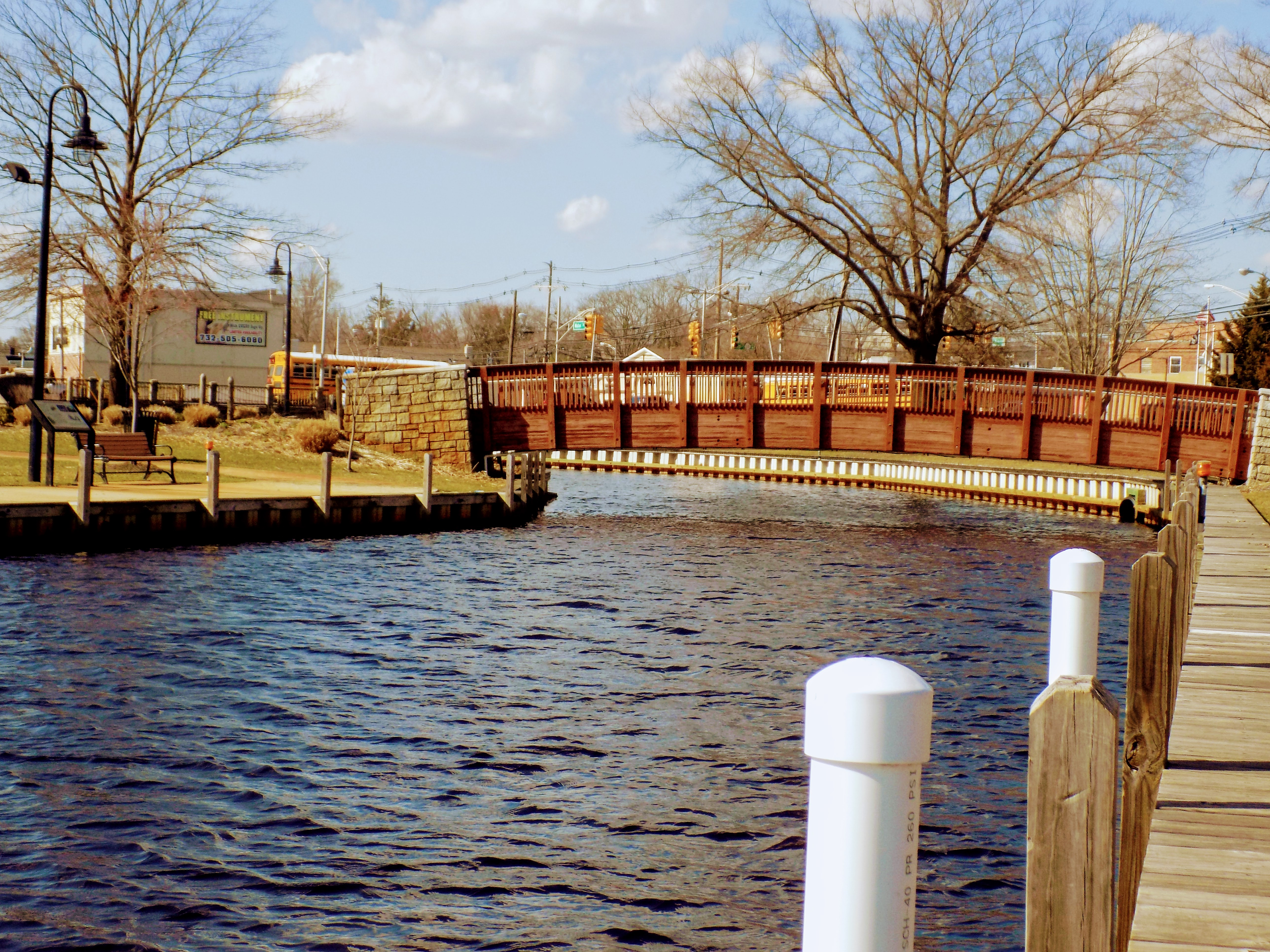
Luker Bridge, in Huddy Park, downtown Toms River, New Jersey

The origin of the name Toms River is unknown but there are several theories. According to historical author Edwin Salter, these are:

- A noted Native American called either "Indian Tom" or "Thomas Pumha", who lived on the river's north bank, in present-day Island Heights, assisted during the American Revolutionary War. Salter said:

A map or sketch made in 1740 of Mosquito Cove and mouth of Toms River (probably by Surveyor Lawrence), has marked on it "Barnegatt [sic] Tom's Wigwam," located upon north point of Mosquito Cove. (This map is in possession of S. H. Shreve, Esq., Toms River.) Indian Tom, it is stated on seemingly good authority, resided on Dillon's Island, near the mouth of Toms River, during the Revolution. As the name ."Toms River," is found about fifty years before (1727,) it throws some doubt upon the statement that the name was derived from him.

— Edwin Salter, A History of Monmouth and Ocean Counties... (1890), pp. 125-126

- Local farmer and ferryman Thomas Luker, who came to the area in the late 1600s. Luker married the daughter of a local Lenape chief in 1695 and they established a homestead on the north bend, near the site of the downtown Toms River Post Office.
- Captain William Tom, an English civil officer for West Jersey from 1664 to 1674, who, during an exploratory expedition, visited the stream and the surrounding region. The river was named in his honor "because he first brought it to the notice of the whites" and persuaded them to settle there. According to Salter, the evidence to support this origin is inconclusive, but this was his preferred origin.

In 1992, during the town's 225th anniversary, the township government and local historians officially recognized Thomas Luker as the Tom in the river's name. During the celebration, a footbridge spanning the river in downtown Huddy Park was named in his honor.

== Pollution incidents ==
In the mid-to-late 20th century, the Toms River river and surrounding township experienced several contamination incidents that lead to the addition of at least two major areas to the United States Environmental Protection Agency's (EPA) list of Superfund sites.

=== Ciba-Geigy ===
Beginning in the early 1900s, Ciba-Geigy Chemical Corporation established a site in Dover Township—now Toms River Township—where it manufactured pigments and dyes. The manufacturing process created a large amount of sludge and toxic waste, which was initially disposed of in unlined pits located on-site. In the 1960s, the company built a 10-mile (16 km)-long pipeline to disposing of nearly two billion gallons of wastewater into the Atlantic Ocean.

In 1980, New Jersey Department of Environmental Protection (NJDEP) issued an order requiring the removal of approximately 15,000 drums from an on-site landfill dump and to initiate groundwater monitoring throughout the 1,400 acres (5.7 km^{2}) property, which included portions of the Pine Barrens and coastal wetlands. That same year, the United States Environmental Protection Agency (EPA) completed a preliminary assessment under the Potential Hazardous Waste Site Program. In 1983, the EPA placed the site on the Superfund National Priorities List.

The EPA has been cleaning up the site since the early 1980s. In September 2000, the agency ordered the excavation and bioremediation of about 150,000 cu yd (110,000 m^{3}) of contaminated soil. Cleanup of the on-site source areas began in October 2003, with off-site processing and treatment finishing in 2010.

According to the department's website, the following milestones have been met so far:

Milestone	Date(s)
Initial Assessment Completed	01/01/1980
Proposed to the National Priorities List	12/30/1982
Finalized on the National Priorities List	09/08/1983
Remedial Investigation Started	03/30/1984
Remedy Selected	04/24/1989
Remedial Action Started	09/14/1989
Final Remedy Selected	09/29/2000
Final Remedial Action Started	09/30/2003
Construction Completed	09/26/2012
Most Recent Five-Year Review	05/07/2018
Deleted from National Priorities List	Not Yet Achieved
Most Recent Five-Year Review	02/22/2023
Achieved Sitewide Ready for Anticipated Reuse	Estimated Apr - Jun 2025

The EPA ordered the site to undergo five reviews, each to be performed every five years. The first sitewide review was conducted in September 2003, and the final review is estimated to be completed in June 2025.

=== Reich Farm ===
In August 1971, the Reich family leased a large portion of their 3-acre (1.2 ha) farm off Route 9 to independent waste hauler Nicholas Fernicola. The lease was to allow Fernicola to temporarily store used 55-US-gallon (210 L) drums on the property, located approximately 1,000 ft (300 m) from an intermittent stream draining into the Toms River.

In December 1971, the Reichs discovered nearly 4,500 waste-filled drums from Union Carbide's Bound Brook, New Jersey, plant, the source of which they identified by the labels on many of the drums. The labels also indicated the contents, which included "blend of resin and oil", "tar pitch", and "lab waste solvent". Evidence of the waste being dumped was found on the property, in the form of trenches that had not existed before the land was rented. The full drums were leaching their contents into the soil and the nearby water table.

The Reichs sued Fernicola and Union Carbide, and in 1972, the court ordered an end to the dumping and the removal of the drums and contaminated soil. In early 1974, residents commented on an unusual smell and taste of their well water. The NJEPA inspected the site and found the groundwater was heavily contaminated with organic compounds, such as phenol and toluene.

The Reich Farm site was included on the EPA's National Priorities List (NPL) in September 1983. After over two decades of remediation and testing, it was removed from the Superfund list in June 2021. The site was ordered to undergo five reviews to be conducted every five years by the EPA. The first sitewide review was performed in September 2003, and the final review was estimated to be completed between September and November 2023.

=== Cancer cluster ===
The Ciba-Geigy and Reich Farms sites resulted in the contamination of an overlapping area of groundwater during a coinciding period. In September 1997, the New Jersey Department of Health (NJDOH), at the request of the Agency for Toxic Substances and Disease Registry, evaluated childhood cancer incidences in Toms River. The NJDOH reviewed data from the State Cancer Registry (SCR) from 1979 to 1991. According to the summary report the NJDOH released: "The results of the 1995 NJDHSS cancer evaluation indicated that Ocean County as a whole and the Toms River section of Dover ... had an excess of childhood brain and central nervous system (CNS) cancer relative to the entire State". The NJDOH reviewed the entire county but found Toms River, which was then known as Dover Township, was "the only statistically significantly elevated town in the county".

As a result of the findings, the NJDOH ordered a case–control study of the area to examine and identify risks factors. The results of this study were made available in January 2003; according to the primary hypothesis, the cancer rates were related to the "environmental exposure pathways" reported over the previous 30 years. The study reported: "No consistent patterns of association were seen between the environmental factors of primary interest and any of the cancer groupings during the postnatal exposure period" and "No consistent patterns of association were seen between the other environmental factors and any of the cancer groupings evaluated". The report acknowledged the findings could be easily biased due to the small sample size, and recommended the continuation of clean-up efforts at the Reich Farm and Ciba-Geigy sites. It was also recommended an additional five-year incidence evaluation be made once the data from 1996 to 2000 was available from the SCR.

A 2014 Pulitzer Prize-winning book, Toms River: A Story of Science and Salvation, examined the cancer cluster in detail. Recent public-private coalitions to restore the river and to preserve the wetland areas near its source in the Pinelands, as well as the EPA stage assessments, have resulted in an increase in water quality.

== Flood events ==
Because the Toms River is tidal with a direct feed into Barnegat Bay and a substantial subwatershed area, it is prone to flooding, particularly at the mouth. The United States Geological Survey (USGS) tracks and reports on significant flood events, and the National Oceanic and Atmospheric Administration (NOAA) tracks daily tide levels. The official USGS flood stage for the river is considered water levels at and above 12 feet (3.7 m), and major flood events occur at and above 14 feet (4.3 m).

=== 2010 Nor'easter ===
From March 12–15, 2010, a Nor'easter hit the New Jersey coastline. The Toms River USGS station (01408500) recorded its highest water level to that point since 1929, before which records were not tracked, and a record discharge of 2,360 cubic feet (67 m^{3}) per second on March 15; the predicted discharge prior to the storm was only 300 cubic feet (8.5 m^{3}) per second.

=== Hurricane Irene ===
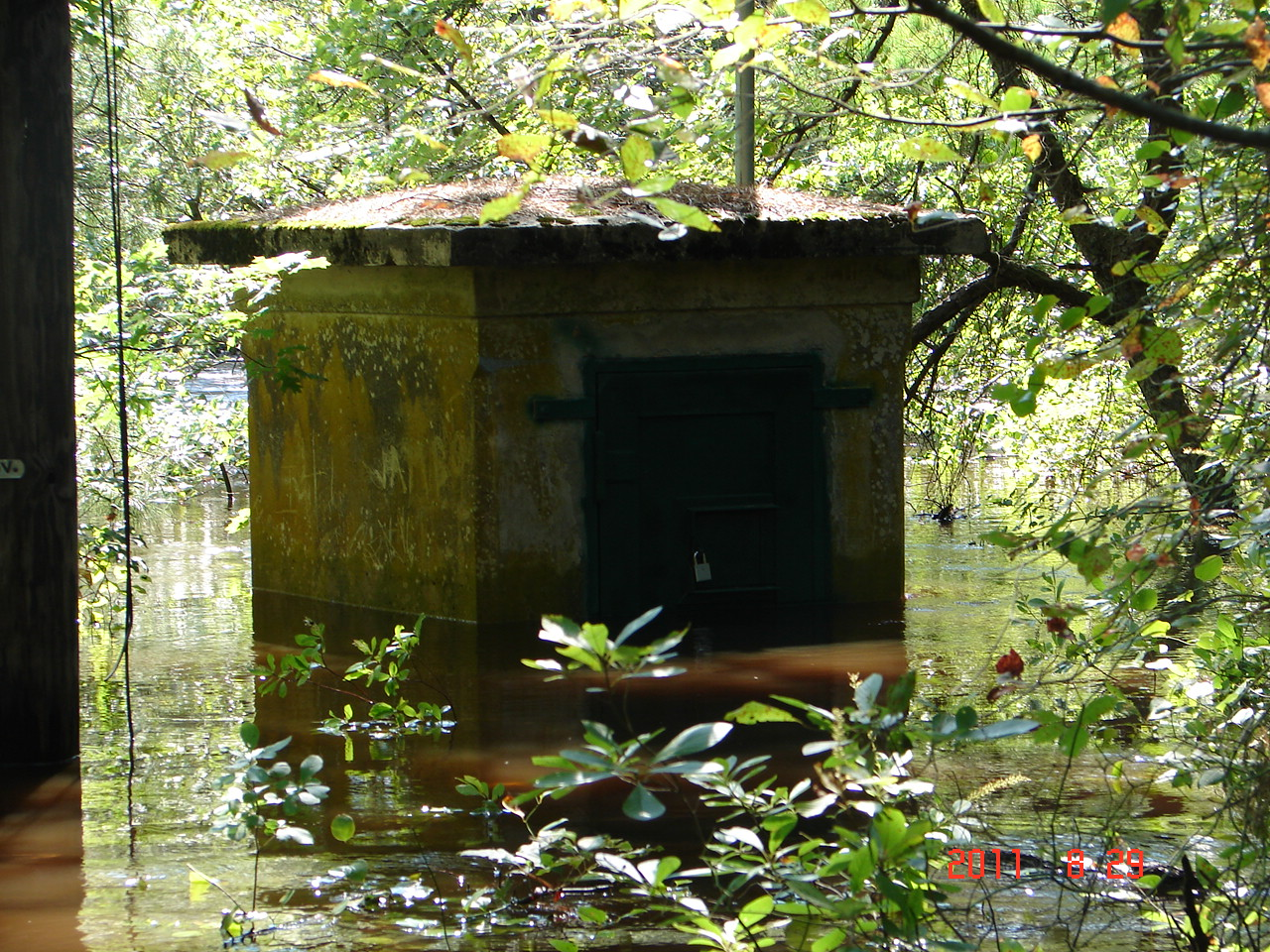
Flooding at streamflow-gaging station on the Toms River, after the peak on August 29, 2011

On August 28, 2011, Hurricane Irene hit the eastern coast of the US for a second time, making landfall near the Little Egg Inlet, about 25 miles (40 km) south of the Toms River's mouth. Irene was the first hurricane to make landfall in New Jersey since 1903. The storm surge that followed, combined with the rainfall from the hurricane and the wet conditions in the weeks prior, led to record USGS gage readings for over 40% of all stations with at least 20 years of data. The highest-recorded flood crest of the Toms River was recorded on August 29, 2011, at 13.62 ft (4.15 m). The previous record was 12.5 ft (3.8 m), set on September 23, 1938, after the 1938 New England hurricane. The river also saw significant water levels in November 2018 (11.74 ft (3.58 m)), October 2005 (11.64 ft (3.55 m)), and May 1984 (11.71 ft (3.57 m)).

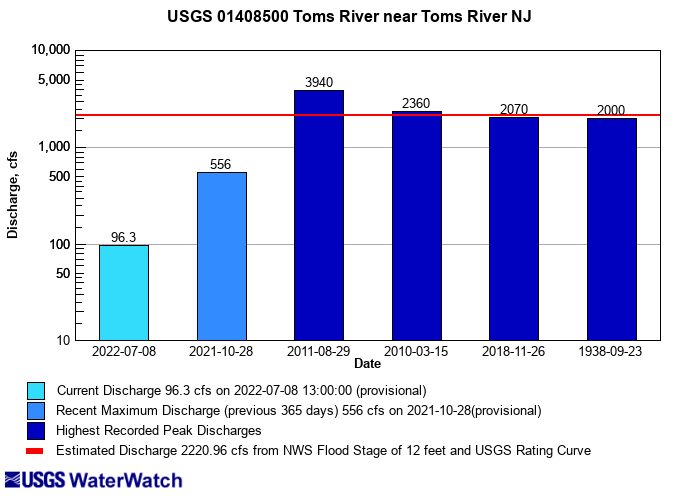
Peak streamflow through the Toms River (July 2022, USGS Water Watch)

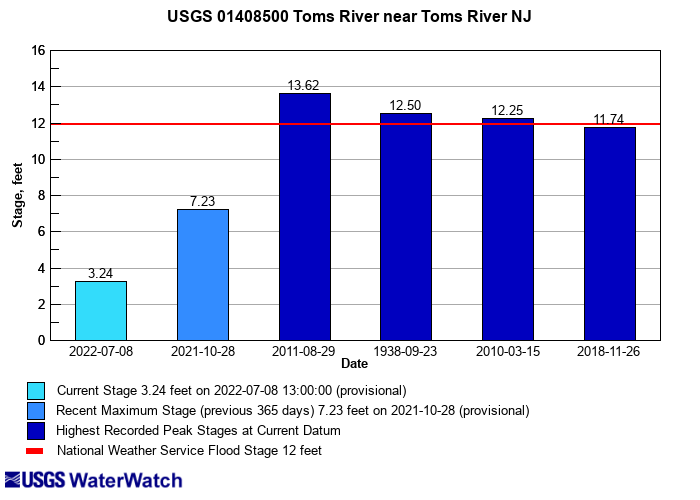
Highest recorded staging of the Toms River (July 2022, USGS Water Watch)

== Tributaries ==
- Davenport Branch
- Ridgeway Branch
- Union Branch
- Wrangle Brook

== See also ==
- List of New Jersey rivers
- List of cancer clusters
- Toms Canyon impact crater
