= Toms River Fest =

Festival in Toms River Township, New Jersey

Coordinates: 39.98260°N 74.19360°W

Toms River Fest logo.

Toms River Fest was a major festival event held at the campus of Toms River High School North in Toms River Township, New Jersey, during the summers of 2005, 2006 and 2008. It was selected by the American Bus Association as one of the Top 100 Events in North America for Group Travel 2006. The festival, originally conceived as an annual event, has not been held since the last one in 2008.

== Low Attendance in 2006 ==
The festival attracted over 70,000 people in its first year. For 2006, over 100,000 people were expected to attend each day, however, estimates showed that only 45,000 attended over the four days. Officials blamed the low attendance rate on a dangerous heat wave, which struck the area with near-record temperatures during the four days of the festival. The revenue for the event was $60,000, down substantially from $394,000 in its previous year.

== Acts ==
In 2005, Maroon 5, Kelly Clarkson, Clay Aiken, Jesse McCartney, Keith Urban, Fuel, Phantom Planet, and others performed.

In 2006, Rihanna, Hilary Duff, Lonestar, Joan Jett and the Blackhearts, Meat Loaf, KC and the Sunshine Band, Martina McBride, Rick Springfield, Live, Alexa Ray Joel, and LeAnn Rimes performed. Hilary Duff was the most successful act in 2006, selling over ten thousand seats.

In 2008, Daughtry, Carrie Underwood, Avril Lavigne, Lifehouse, Live, Collective Soul, Gavin DeGraw, Push Play, The Lost Trailers, Marie Digby, Day of Fire and children's musician Mr. Ray performed.

== Inside Toms River Fest ==
The festival offers free carnival rides, a large food court, free BMX stunt shows, free fireworks, the Millennium Radio Marketplace, a flea market and area for attendees to learn more about local businesses and services, and concerts inside the Poland Spring Arena, which is located on campus, the Lester Glenn Day Stage, and the Pine Belt Night Stage.

Since there is no parking allowed near the festival, free shuttle services are provided by Wachovia and Toms River Regional Schools at the Toms River schools. Meridian Health sponsored the 2008 transportation program, paying for the diesel fuel for the district's large fleet of school buses.

== Toms River Fest 2008 ==
Toms River Fest returned in the Summer of 2008. The official announcement, made May 1, 2008, revealed the headliners to be Carrie Underwood and Daughtry, and that the festival itself would be held for just two days instead of four, August 2–3, 2008. Other artists featured the in lineup include Lifehouse, Live, Collective Soul, Push Play, Gavin DeGraw, The Lost Trailers, and Avril Lavigne.

Other attractions included a "retro arcade" featuring video games and pinball machines in the Poland Spring Arena along with local bands performing, inflatable rides, a food court, and the Hell on Wheels BMX Bike Tour.

While attendance numbers for the festival have yet to be released, the official website claims over 15,000 people attended Daughtry's concert on Sunday night.

Attendance on opening day, Saturday, was noticeably lower than the second day of the festival due to severe weather that passed through the Toms River area on Saturday. Sunny skies hovered over the festival with beautiful temperatures and low humidity on the second day, bringing in thousands of patrons.
