= Robert O. Marshall =

American businessman and criminal (1939–2015)

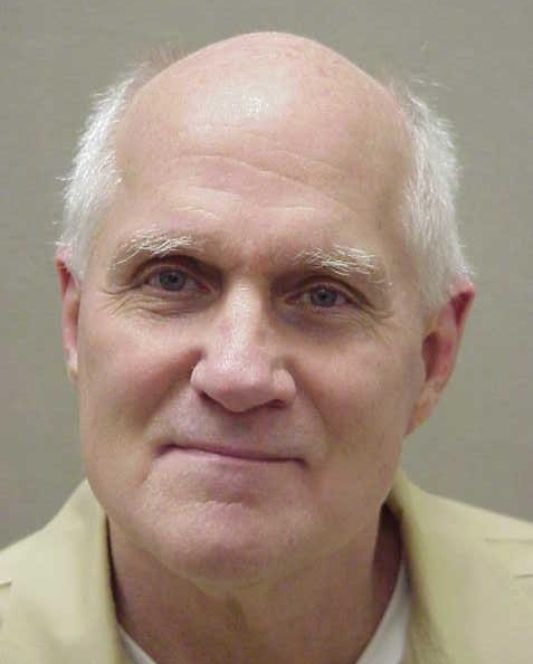
- 2014 mug shot (N.J. Dept of Corrections)
- Born: Robert Oakley Marshall; December 16, 1939; Queens, New York, U.S.
- Died: February 21, 2015 (aged 75); South Woods State Prison, Bridgeton, New Jersey, U.S.
- Occupation: Insurance broker
- Spouse: Maria P. Marshall
- Children: 3
- Motive: $1.5M insurance policy/Affair
- Convictions: Conspiracy to commit murder; Capital murder
- Penalty: Death; commuted to life imprisonment
- Accomplices: Larry Thompson; Robert Cumber; Billy Wayne McKinnon

Details
- Victims: Maria P. Marshall
- Date: September 7, 1984
- Country: United States
- State: New Jersey
- Locations: Garden State Parkway; Oyster Creek picnic area Lacey Township
- Weapon: Gun

Robert Oakley Marshall (December 16, 1939 – February 21, 2015) was an American businessman who in 1984 was charged with (and later convicted of) the contract killing of his wife Maria.

The case attracted the attention of true crime author Joe McGinniss, whose bestselling book on the Marshall case, Blind Faith, was published in 1989. The book was adapted into an Emmy-nominated 1990 TV miniseries of the same name starring Robert Urich and Joanna Kerns.

In 2002 Marshall wrote the book Tunnel Vision: Trial & Error, in which he challenged the conclusions McGinniss drew in Blind Faith. While pointing out flaws in the judicial process he believed failed him, Marshall also alleged that his trial was contaminated by police misconduct and compromised testimony and evidence.

Originally sentenced to death, in 2006, Marshall was resentenced to life in prison, with eligibility for parole in 2014. With a March 2015 parole hearing pending, Marshall died in South Woods State Prison in Bridgeton, New Jersey on February 21, 2015.

== Incident ==
On the night of September 7, 1984, Robert O. Marshall of Toms River, New Jersey, an insurance broker and chairman of the Ocean County Chapter of the United Way fund, and his wife Maria were traveling north on the Garden State Parkway from Harrah's in Atlantic City when, according to Marshall, he felt a vibration in one of the car's tires. He claimed that when he and his wife pulled over at the Oyster Creek picnic area in Lacey Township (which was closed at the time), he noticed the right rear tire was flat. Marshall alleged that he was then knocked unconscious by a blow to the back of his head, and approximately $15,000 worth of casino winnings was stolen. He stated that he awoke to find his wife with two gunshot wounds, dead across the front seat.

After a police investigation, Marshall was arrested on December 19, 1984. The prosecution theorized that Marshall had hired two men to kill his wife so that he could collect on a $1.5 million insurance policy. Also arrested were 47-year-old Robert Cumber of Bossier City, Louisiana, 49-year-old James Davis of Shreveport, Louisiana and 42-year-old Billy Wayne McKinnon of Greenwood, Louisiana, who was a former Caddo Parish, Louisiana deputy officer.

== Trial ==
During the six-week trial, Marshall revealed that he was planning to leave his wife and had hired a private investigator to determine if Maria was consulting with a divorce lawyer, and to determine the whereabouts of over $15,000 of missing casino winnings. Marshall was involved in a 14-month affair with Sarann Kraushaar, a vice-principal at Pinelands Regional High School in Tuckerton, whom he told he wanted to "get rid of" his wife to use her insurance money to pay off his debt.

Marshall was convicted of capital murder for the murder-for-hire on March 5, 1986 and sentenced to death by lethal injection. Cumber, who had introduced Marshall to McKinnon, was convicted as an accomplice and sentenced to life in prison (he was released in 2006). McKinnon pleaded guilty to the charge of conspiracy and was sentenced to five years in prison (he served one). He testified that he was hired by Marshall to kill his wife and that he and the gunman, Larry Thompson, had lain in wait for the Marshalls at the rest stop, where Thompson had committed the murder. Thompson himself was acquitted of murder charges in 1986 due to testimony from family members that he was in Louisiana at the time of the killing. In April 2014, while incarcerated for other crimes, Thompson admitted to having committed the murder of Maria Marshall. Although double jeopardy precluded Thompson from being tried again, his earliest possible parole date under his current sentence was 2071.

== Blind Faith ==
The Marshall case attracted the attention of true crime author Joe McGinniss, whose book on the case, Blind Faith, was published in 1989 and became a bestseller. It was adapted into an Emmy-nominated 1990 TV miniseries of the same name starring Robert Urich as Marshall and Joanna Kerns as Maria.

During filming, Kerns became very close with the Marshalls' son Roby, who served as a consultant on the miniseries. She introduced Roby to actress Tracey Gold, who had costarred with Kerns on the TV series Growing Pains. Roby and Gold later married in 1994 and are currently raising four sons together.

== Incarceration and appeal ==
Though sentenced to death, Marshall remained on death row for many years (the State of New Jersey had not executed anyone since 1963). In 2002, he wrote the book Tunnel Vision: Trial & Error, in which he challenged the conclusions McGinniss drew in Blind Faith. While pointing out flaws in the judicial process he believed failed him, Marshall also alleged that his trial was contaminated by police misconduct and compromised testimony and evidence.

After a June 2003 U.S. Supreme Court decision raised the standard for a defense lawyer's duty in death penalty cases, many standing death sentences began to be overturned. Marshall filed a petition arguing that his lawyer had not met minimal constitutional standards. Though lower courts initially rejected his argument, U.S. District Court Judge Joseph E. Irenas ruled on April 8, 2004 in Camden, New Jersey that Marshall received ineffective assistance from his attorney during the death penalty phase of his trial. The 3rd Circuit Court of Appeals upheld the decision on November 2, 2005. On March 20, 2006, the U.S. Supreme Court declined to hear an appeal by the New Jersey Attorney General's Office. On May 12, 2006, Prosecutor Thomas F. Kelaher declined to retry the death-penalty phase of the case, citing as reasons the difficulty in presenting evidence more than 20 years after the crime, and the probability of many more legal appeals should Marshall be sentenced to death again. With resentencing pending, Marshall faced a minimum of 30 years in prison (in which case he would have been released in 2014) and a maximum of life in prison with no possibility for release on parole before serving 30 years. On August 18, 2006, Marshall was resentenced to life in prison, with the possibility of parole in eight years. This made Marshall, incarcerated since his arrest, eligible for parole in 2014. Until his removal from New Jersey's death row, Marshall had been the longest-serving inmate there since the state reinstated the death penalty in 1982.

In January 2015, a parole board hearing for Marshall — his first — was approved and scheduled for March. Marshall's elder two sons, Roby and Christopher, vowed to speak in front of the board against their father's release. People noted that their younger brother John had, conversely, always believed in Marshall's innocence. With his health reportedly failing in the months prior following a "debilitating stroke", Marshall died in South Woods State Prison in Bridgeton, New Jersey on February 21, 2015.
