= Seacourt Pavilion =

Regional shopping center

Coordinates: 39.97574°N 74.18089°W

The Seacourt Pavilion is a regional shopping center on Hooper Avenue in Toms River, New Jersey. It is right across the street from the Ocean County Mall. The mall has a gross leasable area of 253,000 sq ft (23,500 m^{2}).

The shopping center is split-level, with the parking lot on the east side higher than on the west side. Tenants include Marshalls, Pier 1 Imports (closing 2020), AMC/Loew's Cineplex (closing August 21, 2022), Ashley HomeStore, and HomeGoods. Former tenants include; Old Country Buffet, LA Fitness, (which has its own porte-cochere), Lionel Kiddie City, and Nobody Beats The Wiz.

== History ==
Ground was broken on the project in May 1988, with plans to build a two-level enclosed mall, 12,000 square feet (1,100 m^{2}) of office space and a 150-room hotel. However, the plans for offices and hotel rooms never came to fruition.

As part of a re-envisioning of the traditional shopping center, Seacourt Pavilion created an innovative farmers' market — similar to comparable facilities at Reading Terminal Market in Philadelphia, South Street Seaport in New York City and Quincy Market in Boston — in addition to its existing food court, offering shoppers options for both prepared and farm fresh foods.

The market and food court have since closed down and as of 2008, the majority of the complex houses what were intended to be the original anchor stores after their expansions into available storefronts.

Seacourt Pavilion was briefly featured in the 2009 MTV series Jersey Shore, where the female cast members go tanning at the Simply Sun Tanning salon.
