= Union Branch =

River in New Jersey, United States

Coordinates: 40.009497°N 74.29045°W

The Union Branch is a 6.9-mile-long (11.1 km) tributary of the Toms River in Ocean County, New Jersey in the United States.

== Tributaries ==
- Ridgeway Branch

== See also ==
- List of rivers of New Jersey
