= River City Extension =

American indie rock band

- Origin: Toms River, New Jersey, U.S.
- Genres: Indie folk, Alternative rock
- Years active: 2007–2015
- Labels: XOXO Records(former); Anchor & Hope Music(former); Asbestos Records
- Past members: Joe Michelini; Patrick O'brien; John Muccino; J.W. Gilman; Shane Luckenbaugh; Nick Cucci; Jenn Fantaccione; Dan Melius; James Ramirez; Sam Tacon; Steve Tambone; Desiree Hartman; Nicole Scorsone; Matt Goold; Mike Costaney
- Website: Official website

River City Extension was an American indie rock band based in Toms River, New Jersey. The band released their debut EP, Nautical Sabbatical in 2009. Following the release of a full-length album, The Unmistakable Man in 2010, the band was picked up by New Jersey independent record label XOXO Records. On September 8, 2015, the band announced via social media that they would be parting ways.

== Background ==
In 2007, prior to the formation of River City Extension, Joe Michelini had already established a local reputation as a solo act when he decided to assemble a small acoustic combo. It soon expanded to an eight-member lineup.

== Reception ==
The Unmistakable Man earned the band positive reviews from Paste magazine and NPR. The band's follow-up LP "Don't Let the Sun Go Down on Your Anger" was also well received by Paste magazine as well as Consequence of Sound.

== Festivals and tours ==
In 2011, the band toured heavily in support of The Unmistakable Man, becoming the first artist ever to perform at both the Newport Folk Festival and the Warped Tour. They additionally performed at the Bonnaroo Music Festival, Austin City Limits, B.O.M.B. Fest, South by Southwest, and The Bamboozle. They also toured in support of Brand New, The Get Up Kids, Steel Train, Max Bemis (of Say Anything), Kevin Devine, Alkaline Trio, The Apache Relay and The Avett Brothers. In conjunction with their tour supporting Kevin Devine, the band and Devine released a collaborative split 7-inch vinyl EP, including two new River City Extension songs, "Ballad of Oregon" and "Point of Surrender".

In October 2011, it was announced that River City Extension planned to record its second full-length album with producer Brian Deck that fall. The album, Don't Let The Sun Go Down On Your Anger was released June 5, 2012. The title paraphrases a quote from the Bible verse found at Ephesians 4:26, which speaks to believer's about righteous indignation or anger. "In your anger do not sin: Do not let the sun go down while you are still angry." (New International Version) Michelini's mother would often recite this verse when he was a child. The band supported the album with a five-week US tour, co-headlining with The Drowning Men. They continued touring through the summer, including stints supporting Blind Pilot and Manchester Orchestra.

In June 2012, it was announced that the band would perform at the October 2012 Austin City Limits Music Festival. As of November 2015 the band no longer plays together.

== Discography ==
- Nautical Sabbatical EP (2009)
- The Unmistakable Man (2010)
- Split 7-inch with Kevin Devine (2011)
- Don't Let The Sun Go Down On Your Anger (2012)
- Deliverance (2015)
