= Blind Faith (McGinniss book) =

1989 book by Joe McGinniss

- First edition (US)
- Author: Joe McGinniss
- Language: English
- Genre: True crime
- Publisher: G. P. Putnam's Sons
- Publication date: October 3, 1989
- Publication place: United States
- Media type: Print (hardcover)
- Pages: 464
- ISBN: 0-451-16218-8
- Preceded by: Fatal Vision (1983)
- Followed by: Cruel Doubt (1991)

Blind Faith is a 1989 true crime book by Joe McGinniss, based on the 1984 case in which American businessman Robert O. Marshall was charged with (and later convicted of) the contract killing of his wife, Maria. The book was adapted into a television miniseries of the same name in 1990.

== Overview ==
On the night of September 7, 1984, insurance broker Marshall and his wife, Maria, were traveling home from Atlantic City, New Jersey, when, according to Marshall, he pulled over at a picnic area with a flat tire. Marshall alleged that he was then knocked unconscious by a blow to the back of his head, and approximately $15,000 worth of casino winnings was stolen. He stated that he awoke to find his wife with two gunshot wounds, dead across the front seat. After a police investigation, Marshall was arrested on December 19, 1984. The prosecution theorized that Marshall had hired two men to kill his wife so that he could collect on a $1.5 million insurance policy. Marshall was convicted of capital murder for the murder-for-hire on March 5, 1986 and sentenced to death by lethal injection.

Blind Faith maintains that to the affluent residents of Toms River, New Jersey, Marshall was a devoted family man and respected member of the community. But soon after his wife's death, Marshall's perfect image began to unravel as the police investigation uncovered debt, infidelity and a $1.5 million insurance policy. McGinniss attended the Marshall trial, and used court transcripts, extensive interviews with family and friends and general research to recreate the events surrounding the murder of Maria Marshall, the subsequent trial and eventual conviction of her husband. McGinniss changed the names and some personal details of most of the real people involved in the case, except for the Marshall family themselves, Judge Manuel Greenberg, assistant prosecutor Kevin Kelly, and a handful of others. McGinniss wrote that by the time Marshall was convicted and sentenced to death in 1986, everyone who knew him, including two of his three sons, believed him guilty. The book concludes with a status update of key players (including the Marshalls' three sons) in 1987, a year after the conviction.

Blind Faith was a bestseller.

== Rebuttal ==
In 2002, Marshall wrote the book Tunnel Vision: Trial & Error, in which he challenged the conclusions McGinniss drew in Blind Faith. While pointing out flaws in the judicial process he believed failed him, Marshall also alleged that his trial was contaminated by police misconduct and compromised testimony and evidence.

== Adaptation ==
In 1990, Blind Faith was adapted by screenwriter John Gay into an Emmy Award-nominated TV miniseries starring Robert Urich, Joanna Kerns, Dennis Farina, Johnny Galecki, and Joe Spano.

== See also ==
- Robert O. Marshall
