= Dan Fagin =

American journalist (born 1963)

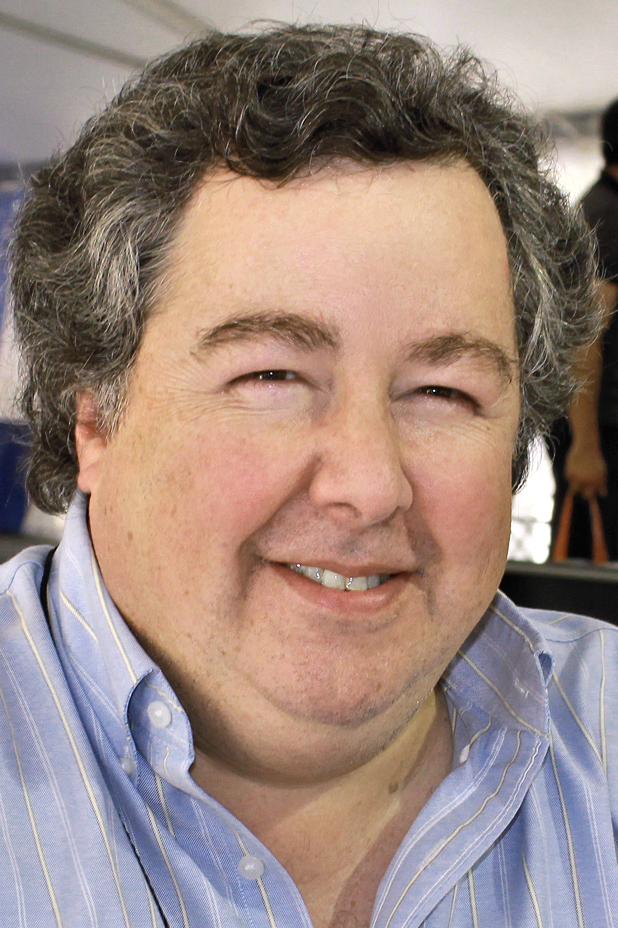
- Fagin at the 2015 Texas Book Festival
- Born: February 1, 1963 (age 63); Oklahoma City, Oklahoma, U.S.
- Education: Dartmouth College
- Occupations: Environmental journalist, New York University journalism professor
- Relatives: Lisa Fagin Davis (sister)
- Writing career
- Notable awards: Pulitzer Prize for General Nonfiction (2014)
- Website: DanFagin.com

Dan Fagin (born February 1, 1963) is an American journalist who specializes in environmental science. He won the 2014 Pulitzer Prize for General Nonfiction for his best-selling book Toms River: A Story of Science and Salvation. Toms River also won the Helen Bernstein Book Award for Excellence in Journalism, the National Academies Communication Award, and the Rachel Carson Environment Book Award of the Society of Environmental Journalists, among other literary prizes.

== Early life ==
Fagin was born in Oklahoma City and attended high school at Bishop McGuinness Catholic High School, where he was friends with another future author, Blake Bailey. Fagin graduated in 1985 from Dartmouth College, where he served as the editor-in-chief of The Dartmouth (the college's daily newspaper).

== Career ==
From 1991 to 2005, Fagin was the environmental writer at Newsday, where he was a principal member of two reporting teams that were finalists for the Pulitzer Prize. Fagin is a former president of the Society of Environmental Journalists. In 2003, his stories about cancer epidemiology won the Science Journalism Award of the American Association for the Advancement of Science, and also won the Science-in-Society Award of the National Association of Science Writers.

Fagin is a professor of journalism at the Arthur L. Carter Journalism Institute at New York University, and the director of the NYU Science, Health and Environmental Reporting Program. He is also the founder and director of the NYU Science Communication Workshops. His book Toms River: A Story of Science and Salvation was published March 19, 2013. In a review, Abigail Zuger in the New York Times called it "a new classic of science reporting." He is also the co-author with Marianne Lavelle of the book Toxic Deception: How the Chemical Industry Manipulates Science, Bends the Law and Endangers Your Health (1997). Fagin is currently working on a book about monarch butterflies and the future of biodiversity in the Anthropocene.

== Personal life ==
He is married to Alison Frankel, a senior legal writer at Thomson-Reuters; they have two children and live in Sea Cliff, NY.
