= Ocean County Courthouse =

- U.S. National Register of Historic Places
- New Jersey Register of Historic Places
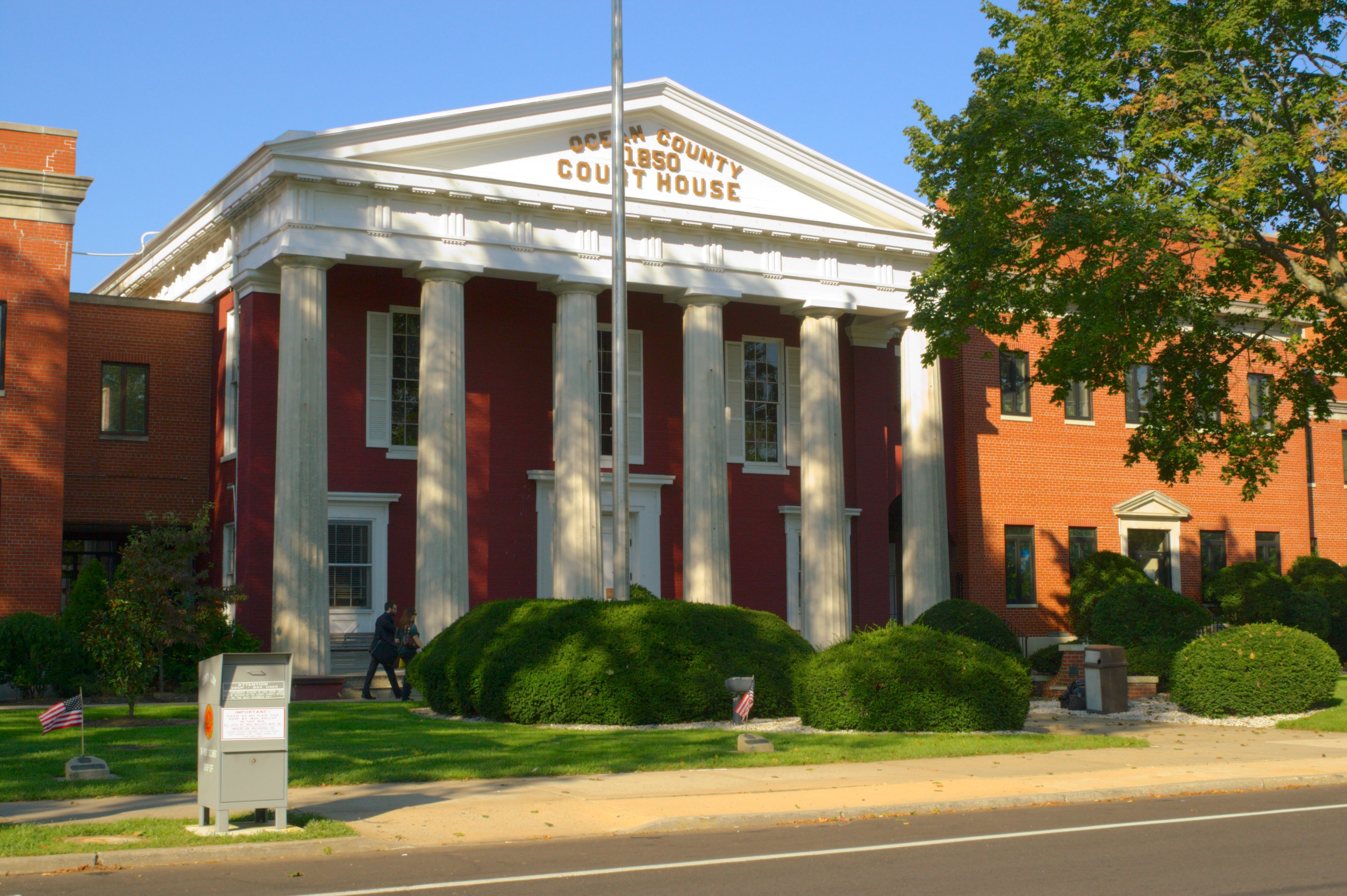

- Location within Ocean County, New Jersey Location within New Jersey Location within the United States
- Location: 118 Washington Street, Toms River, New Jersey, U.S.
- Coordinates: 39°57′11″N 74°11′41″W
- Area: 3.5 acres (1.4 ha)
- Built: 1850–1851
- Architectural style: Greek Revival
- MPS: Old Village of Toms River MRA
- NRHP reference No.: 83001610
- NJRHP No.: 2292

Significant dates
- Added to NRHP: August 16, 1983
- Designated NJRHP: June 17, 1981

The Ocean County Courthouse is located at 118 Washington Street in Toms River in Ocean County, New Jersey, United States. The historic brick courthouse was constructed from 1850 to 1851 and was added to the National Register of Historic Places on August 16, 1983, for its significance in architecture. It was listed as part of the Old Village of Toms River Multiple Property Submission (MPS).

The Greek Revival courthouse features six Doric columns and a portico with pediment. It was modeled after the old courthouse for Hudson County. Two wings were added in the early 1950s.

== See also ==
- County courthouses in New Jersey
- National Register of Historic Places listings in Ocean County, New Jersey
