= Ridgeway Branch =

River in New Jersey, United States

Coordinates: 40°01′27″N 74°17′10″W

The Ridgeway Branch is a 10.6-mile-long (17.1 km) tributary of the Union Branch in Ocean County, New Jersey in the United States.

== See also ==
- List of rivers of New Jersey
