= Toms River: A Story of Science and Salvation =

Book by Dan Fagin

- Author: Dan Fagin
- Language: English
- Subject: Environmental issues in the United States, environmental science, oncology
- Genre: Nonfiction
- Publisher: Bantam
- Publication date: March 2013
- Publication place: United States
- Media type: Print (Hardback)
- Pages: 560
- ISBN: 978-0-553-80653-3
- Dewey Decimal: 363.7209749/48
- LC Class: 2012-017030

Toms River: A Story of Science and Salvation is a 2013 nonfiction book by the American author Dan Fagin. It is about the dumping of industrial pollution by chemical companies including Ciba-Geigy, in Toms River, New Jersey, beginning in 1952 through the 1980s, and the epidemiological investigations of a cancer cluster that subsequently emerged there. The book won the 2014 Pulitzer Prize for General Nonfiction, the 2014 Helen Bernstein Book Award for Excellence in Journalism, and the 2014 National Academies Communication Award.

== Editions ==
- Dan Fagin (March 19, 2013). Toms River: A Story of Science and Salvation. Bantam. ISBN 978-0553806533.
- Audiobook narrated by Dan Woren, published by Random House Audio, March 19, 2013
- E-book editions
