= List of waterways forming and crossings of the Atlantic Intracoastal Waterway =

This is a list of waterways that form the Atlantic Intracoastal Waterway, sometimes called the Intracoastal Canal, and crossings (bridges, tunnels and ferries) of it.

== Florida ==
- Florida Bay
- Baker Cut (manmade)
- Buttonwood Sound
- Grouper Creek
- Tarpon Basin
- Dusenberg Creek
- Blackwater Sound
- Jewfish Creek
  - Jewfish Creek Bridge (U.S. 1 (SR 5))
- Barnes Sound
- Little Card Sound
  - Card Sound Bridge
- Card Sound
- Biscayne Bay
  - Rickenbacker Causeway (north approach is SR 913)
  - Dodge Island Bridge (SR 886)
  - MacArthur Causeway (SR A1A)
  - Venetian Causeway
  - Julia Tuttle Causeway (I-195 (SR 112))
  - John F. Kennedy Causeway (SR 934)
  - Broad Causeway (SR 922)
- Biscayne Creek
  - Sunny Isles Causeway (SR 826)
- Dumfoundling Bay
- Man-made canal
  - William Lehman Causeway (SR 856)
  - Hallandale Beach Bridge (SR 858)
  - SR 820
  - SR 822
  - SR A1A
- Stranahan River
  - 17th Street Causeway (SR A1A)
- New River
- New River Sound
  - SR 842
- Middle River
- Man-made canal
  - SR 838
  - SR 816
  - SR 870
  - SR 814
  - SR 844
- Hillsboro River
  - SR 810 (Hillsboro Blvd.)
- Man-made canal (Hillsboro Canal branches off it)
  - El Camino Real
- Lake Boca Raton
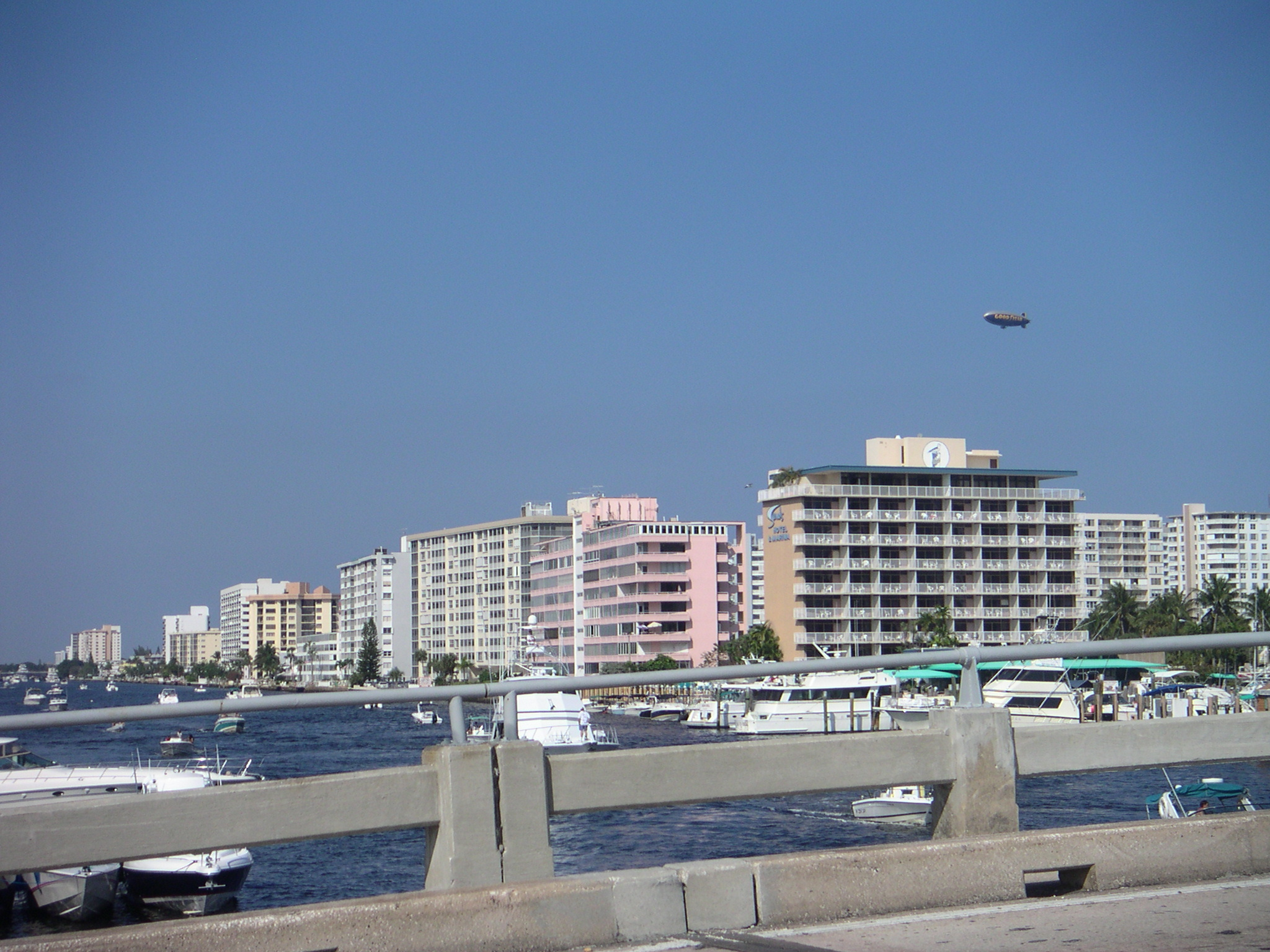
  The intracoastal waterway in Pompano Beach, Florida
  - Palmetto Park Road (CR 798)
- Man-made canal?
- Lake Wyman
- Lake Rogers, Boca Raton
  - SR 800
- Man-made canal
  - Linton Boulevard (CR 782)
  - SR 806
  - George Bush Boulevard (CR 806A)
  - Southeast 15th Avenue (CR 792)
  - SR 804
- Lake Worth
  - Lantana Bridge (Ocean Avenue)
  - Harris Bridge (SR 802)
  - Southern Boulevard Bridge (US 98 / SR 80)
  - Royal Palm Bridge (SR 704)
  - Flagler Memorial Bridge (SR A1A)
  - Riviera Beach Bridge (SR A1A)
- Lake Worth Creek
  - U.S. 1 (SR 5)
  - SR 786
  - Donald Ross Road
  - SR 706
- Loxahatchee River
  - U.S. 1 (SR 5)
- Jupiter Sound
  - CR 707

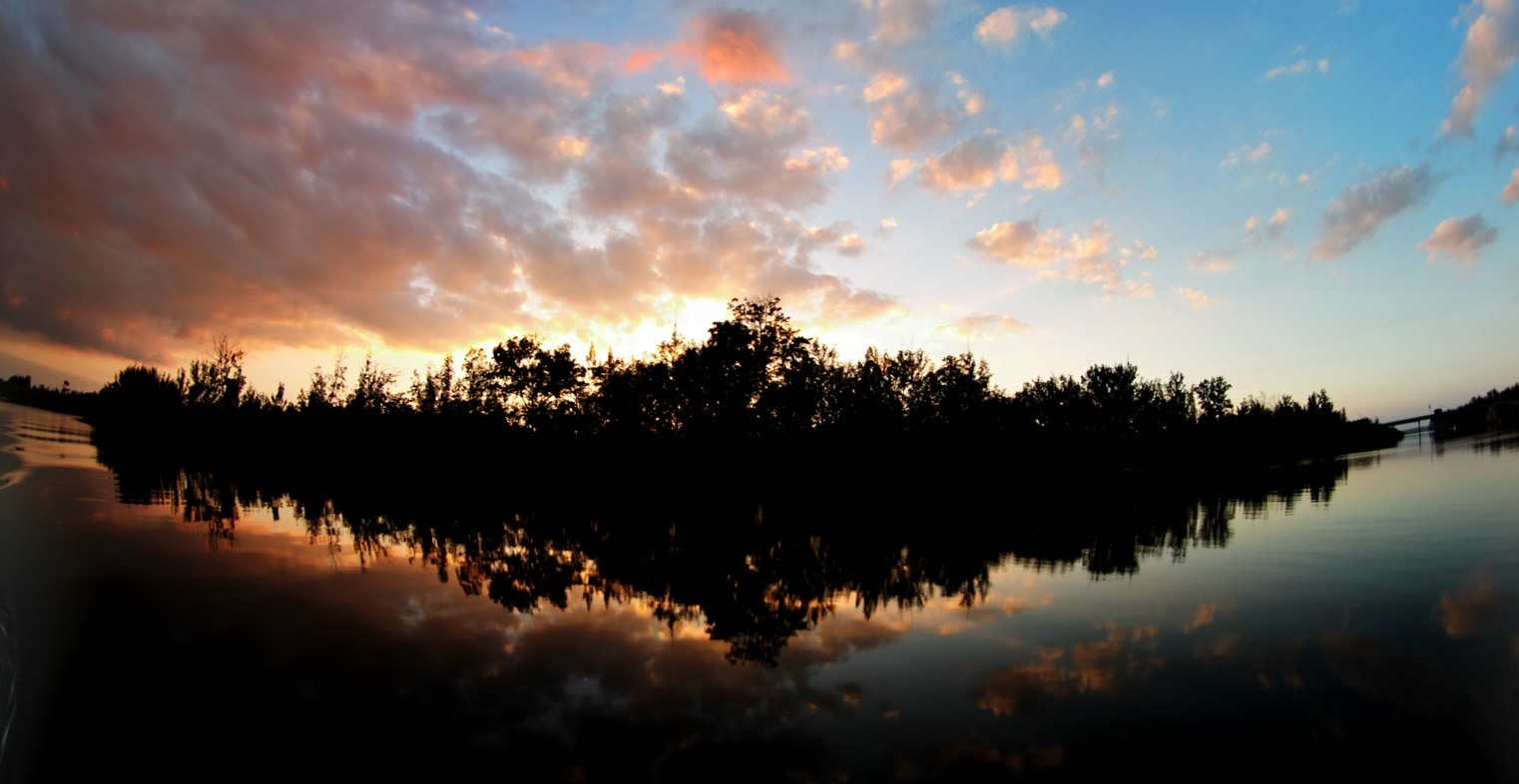
Sunset from the Intracoastal Waterway in Hobe Sound

- Hobe Sound
- Jupiter Narrows
  - CR 707
- Peck Lake
- Man-made canal
- Great Pocket
- Indian River
  - SR A1A
  - Frank A. Wacha Bridge (SR 732)
  - South Causeway Bridge (SR A1A)
  - North Causeway Bridge (SR A1A)
  - 17th Street Causeway (SR 656)
  - Merrill P. Barber Bridge (SR 60)
  - Wabasso Causeway (SR 510)
  - Ernest Kouwen-Hoven Bridge (Melbourne Causeway) (US 192 (SR 500))
  - Eau Gallie Bridge (Eau Gallie Causeway) (SR 518)
  - Pineda Bridge (Pineda Causeway) (SR 404)
  - Hubert H. Humphrey Bridge (Merritt Island Causeway) (SR 520)
  - Emory L. Bennett Causeway (SR 528)
  - NASA Parkway (SR 405)
  - A. Maxwell Brewer Memorial Causeway (CR 402)
  - U.S. Government Railroad
- Haulover Canal (manmade)
  - Former SR 3
- Indian River North
- Mosquito Lagoon
  - South Causeway (New Smyrna Beach) (SR A1A)
  - North Causeway (New Smyrna Beach) (SR 44)
- Ponce de Leon Cut (manmade)
- Halifax River
  - Port Orange Causeway (William V. Chappell Jr. Memorial Bridge or Dunlawton Bridge) (SR A1A)
  - Veterans Memorial Bridge (CR 4050)
  - Broadway Bridge (US 92 and SR 600)
  - Main Street Bridge (CR 4040)
  - Seabreeze Bridge (SR 430)
  - Granada Bridge (SR 40)
- Halifax Creek
- Smith Creek
  - Knox Memorial Bridge
  - SR 100
- Man-made canal
- Fox Cut (manmade)
- Man-made canal
  - Palm Coast Parkway
- Matanzas River
  - SR 206
  - SR 312
  - Bridge of Lions (SR A1A)
- Tolomato River
  - Vilano Beach Bridge (SR A1A)
- Man-made canal
- Tolomato River
- Man-made canal
  - Palm Valley Bridge (CR 210)
- Pablo Creek
  - SR 202 "Butler Blvd"
  - McCormick Bridge (US 90 "Beach Blvd." (SR 212))
  - SR 10 "Atlantic Blvd."
  - SR 116 "Wonderwood Bridge"
- Sisters Creek
  - SR 105
- Gunnison Cut (manmade)
- Sawpit Creek
- Man-made canal
- South Amelia River
- Man-made canal
- Kingsley Creek
  - SR A1A/SR 200
- Amelia River
- Cumberland Sound Florida/Georgia state line

== Georgia ==
- Cumberland Sound – USGS Feature Detail Report
  - Passenger ferry between St Marys and Cumberland Island
- Cumberland Dividings – USGS Feature Detail Report
- Cumberland River – USGS Feature Detail Report
- St. Andrew Sound – USGS Feature Detail Report
- Jekyll Sound – USGS Feature Detail Report
- Jekyll Creek (Jekyll River) – USGS Feature Detail Report
  - Jekyll Island Causeway, M. E. Thompson Bridge
- Brunswick River – USGS Feature Detail Report
- Saint Simons Sound – USGS Feature Detail Report
- Manhead Sound – USGS Feature Detail Report
- Mackay River – USGS Feature Detail Report
  - F. J. Torras Causeway
- Buttermilk Sound – USGS Feature Detail Report
- Altamaha Sound – USGS Feature Detail Report
- Little Mud River – USGS Feature Detail Report
- Back River (Georgia) – USGS Feature Detail Report
- North River – USGS Feature Detail Report
- Doboy Sound – USGS Feature Detail Report
- Old Teakettle Creek – USGS Feature Detail Report
- Crescent River – USGS Feature Detail Report
- Creighton Narrows – USGS Feature Detail Report
- Front River – USGS Feature Detail Report
- Sapelo River – USGS Feature Detail Report
- Sapelo Sound – USGS Feature Detail Report
- South Newport River – USGS Feature Detail Report
- Johnson Creek
- North Newport River – USGS Feature Detail Report
- Saint Catherines Sound – USGS Feature Detail Report
- Bear River
- Florida Passage – USGS Feature Detail Report
- Ogeechee River
- Hell Gate – USGS Feature Detail Report
- Ossabaw Sound – USGS Feature Detail Report
- Green Island Sound – USGS Feature Detail Report
- Vernon River – USGS Feature Detail Report
- Moon River
- Skidaway Narrows – USGS Feature Detail Report
- Skidaway River – USGS Feature Detail Report
- Wilmington River – USGS Feature Detail Report
- Saint Augustine Creek – USGS Feature Detail Report
- Elba Island Cut – USGS Feature Detail Report
- South Channel Savannah River – USGS Feature Detail Report
- Savannah River

== South Carolina ==
In South Carolina, the waterway is made of numerous natural and manmade waterways that wind among the sea islands. The Pine Island cut is the longest manmade section of the entire waterway. It was the last section of the waterway to be completed and was dedicated on April 11, 1936.

- Savannah River
- Fields Cut
- Wright River
- Watts Cut
- New River
- Ramshorn Creek
- Calibogue Sound
- Skull Creek
  - Fixed span to Hilton Head Island
- Port Royal Sound
- Beaufort River
  - Ladys Island Swing Bridge
- Brickyard Creek
- Coosaw River
- Ashepoo Coosaw Cutoff
- Rock Creek
- Ashepoo Coosaw Cutoff
- Ashepoo River
- Fenwick Cut
- South Edisto River
- Watts Cut
- North Creek
- Dawhoo River
  - McKinley Washington, Jr. Bridge (fixed span)
- Wadmalaw River
- Church Flats
- Stono River
  - John F. Limehouse Memorial Bridge (fixed span)
- Elliott Cut
- Wappoo Creek
  - Wappoo Creek Bridge
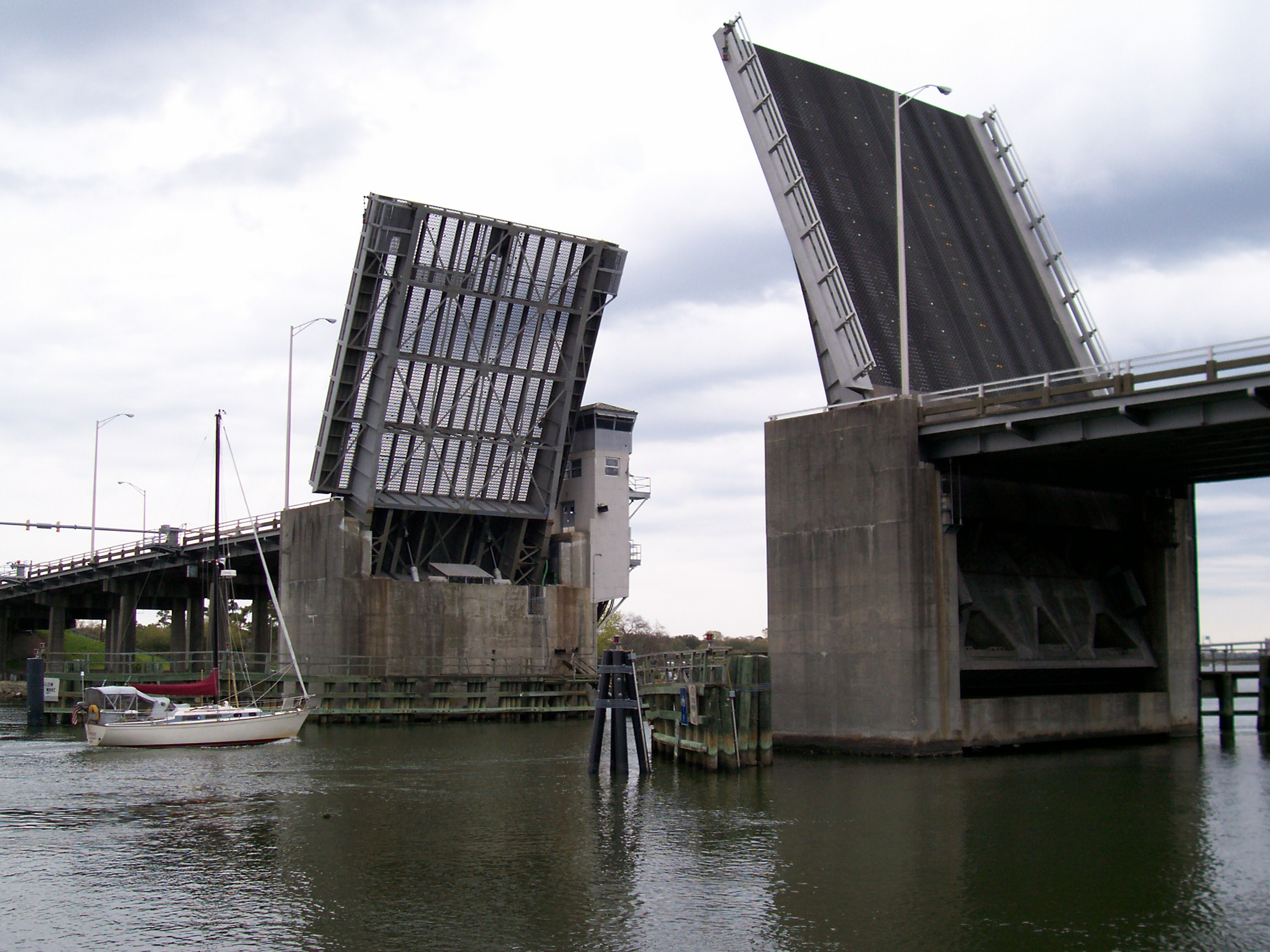
    The Wappoo Creek bascule bridge near Charleston, SC.
  - Cooper River (Charleston County, South Carolina)
- Charleston Harbor
- Jeanette Creek
- Sullivans Narrows
  - Ben Sawyer Bridge (swing span)
- Meeting Reach
  - Isle of Palms Connector Bridge (fixed span)
- Seven Reaches
- Copahee Sound
- Capers Creek
- Price Creek
- Seewee Bay
- manmade canal
- Graham Creek
- Awendaw Creek
- Harbor River
- Mathews Cut
- Casino Creek
- Fourmile Creek Canal (crosses South Santee River)
- North Santee River
- Estherville Minim Creek Canal
  - South Island Ferry
- Winyah Bay
- Waccamaw River
  - L. W. Siau Bridge (fixed span)
- Socastee Creek
  - Benjamin Thrailkill Bridge (fixed span)
  - Socastee Swing Bridge (Dick Pond Road)
- Pine Island cut (manmade canal, approximately 24 miles long)
  - US 501, Black Skimmer Trail (fixed span)
  - Pine Island bascule bridge, originally built as a combination rail and vehicle span
  - Robert M. Grissom Parkway (fixed span)
  - Grande Dunes Boulevard (fixed span)
  - S.C. 22/Future I-73 (fixed spans)
  - Barefoot Resort Bridge (swing bridge)
- Little River
  - Little River swing bridge
  - US 17 / SC 9 (fixed span)

== North Carolina ==
- manmade canal
  - Sunset Boulevard (Sunset Beach)
  - NC 904 (Ocean Isle Beach)
- Shallotte River
- manmade canal
  - NC 130 (Holden Beach)
- Lockwoods Folly River
- manmade canal
  - (Future Second Oak Island crossing)
  - NC 133
  - NC 211
  - NC 87
- Cape Fear River
- manmade canal
  - US 421
- Masonboro Sound
  - US 74 / US 76
- Middle Sound
- Topsail Sound
  - NC 50 / NC 210
- Stump Sound
  - NC 210
- New River
- White Oak River
- Bogue Sound
  - NC 58
  - Bay View Road
- Newport River
  - Future I-42 / US 70
- manmade canal
  - NC 101
- Adams Creek
- Neuse River
- Pamlico Sound
- manmade canal
  - NC 33 / NC 308
- Goose Creek
- Pamlico River
- Pungo River
- manmade canal
  - US 264 / NC 45
  - NC 94
- Alligator River
  - US 64
- Albemarle Sound
- North River
- Great Swamp
- manmade canal
  - US 158
- Currituck Sound
- North Landing River

== Virginia ==
- North Landing River
  - Pungo Ferry Road
  - VA 165
- manmade canal
  - Centerville Turnpike
  - VA 168/Chesapeake Expressway
- South Branch Elizabeth River
  - VA 168 Business/Battlefield Boulevard
  - US 17/Dominion Boulevard
  - High Rise Bridge (I-64/Hampton Roads Beltway)
  - Gilmerton Bridge (US 13/US 460/Military Highway)
  - Jordan Bridge (VA 337)
  - Downtown Tunnel (I-264/US 460 Alternate)
- Elizabeth River
  - Midtown Tunnel (US 58)
- Hampton Roads
- James River
  - Hampton Roads Bridge–Tunnel (I-64/Hampton Roads Beltway)

== Maryland ==
- Chesapeake Bay
  - Chesapeake Bay Bridge (US 50 / US 301)
- Chesapeake and Delaware Canal
  - Chesapeake City Bridge (MD 213)

== Delaware ==
- Chesapeake and Delaware Canal
  - Summit Bridge (DE 71 / DE 896)
  - Chesapeake & Delaware Canal Lift Bridge (Delmarva Central Railroad)
  - Senator William V. Roth Jr. Bridge (DE 1)
  - St. Georges Bridge (US 13)
  - Reedy Point Bridge (DE 9)
- Delaware Bay

== New Jersey ==
- New Jersey Intracoastal Waterway
- Cape May Canal
  - Route 162
  - Route 109
  - Middle Thorofare Bridge (CR 621 (Ocean Drive))
- Jarvis Sound
  - George Reading Wildwood Bridge (Route 47)
- Grassy Sound
  - Route 147
  - Grassy Sound Bridge (CR 619 (Ocean Drive))
- Great Channel
  - Stone Harbor Bridge (CR 657 (Stone Harbor Blvd))
- Great Sound
  - CR 601 (Avalon Blvd)
- Ingrams Thorofare
- Townsend Channel
- Ludlam Thoroughfare
  - CR 625 (Sea Isle Blvd)
- Ludlam Bay
- Crook Horn Creek
  - 34th Street Bridge (CR 623)
- Peck Bay
- Great Egg Harbor
  - Howard S. Stainton Memorial Causeway/Ninth Street Bridge (Route 52)
- Risley Channel
  - John F. Kennedy Memorial Bridge (Route 152)
  - Downbeach Express (CR 563)
- Lake's Bay
- West Canal
- Inside Thorofare
  - US 40/US 322
  - Atlantic City Expressway
  - US 30
- Clam Thorofare
- Reed's Bay
- Little Bay
- Great Bay
- Little Egg Harbor
  - Manahawkin Bay Bridge (Route 72)
- Manahawkin Bay
- Barnegat Bay
  - Thomas A. Mathis and J. Stanley Tunney Bridges (Route 37)
  - CR 528 (Mantoloking Rd)
- Point Pleasant Canal
  - Lovelandtown Bridge (Route 13)
  - Route 88
- Manasquan River

== New York ==
- The New York State Canal System is part of the Intracoastal Waterway
- Lower New York Bay
- The Narrows
  - Verrazzano–Narrows Bridge (I-278)
- Upper New York Bay
- East River
  - City Tunnel #1
  - Brooklyn–Battery Tunnel (unsigned I-478)
  - Joralemon Street Tunnel
  - Montague Street Tunnel
  - Clark Street Tunnel
  - Cranberry Street Tunnel
  - Brooklyn Bridge
  - Manhattan Bridge
  - Rutgers Street Tunnel
  - Williamsburg Bridge
  - 13th Street Pumping Station tunnel
  - 14th Street Tunnel
  - East River Tunnels
  - Queens Midtown Tunnel (I-495)
  - Steinway Tunnel
  - 53rd Street Tunnel
  - Queensboro Bridge (59th Street Bridge) (NY 25)
  - 60th Street Tunnel
  - 63rd Street Tunnel
  - Roosevelt Island Bridge (36th Ave)
  - City Tunnel #3
  - Triborough Bridge (East River Suspension Span) (I-278)
  - Hell Gate Bridge (Main span)
  - Bronx–Whitestone Bridge (I-678)
  - Throgs Neck Bridge (I-295)
- Long Island Sound

== Connecticut ==
- Long Island Sound
  - Bridgeport & Port Jefferson Ferry
  - Cross Sound Ferry

== Rhode Island ==
- Block Island Sound
- Rhode Island Sound

== Massachusetts ==
- Buzzards Bay
- Cape Cod Canal
  - Cape Cod Canal Railroad Bridge
  - Bourne Bridge – Route 28
  - Sagamore Bridge – U.S. Route 6
- Cape Cod Bay
- Massachusetts Bay
- Annisquam River
  - Blynman Canal Bridge
  - Gloucester Railroad Bridge
  - Route 128 bridge

== New Hampshire ==
- Piscataqua River – mouth forms harbor

== Maine ==
- Gulf of Maine
- Casco Bay
- Penobscot Bay

== See also ==
- Waterways forming and crossings of the Gulf Intracoastal Waterway
