= Intracoastal Waterway =

Inland waterway along the Atlantic and Gulf coasts of the United States

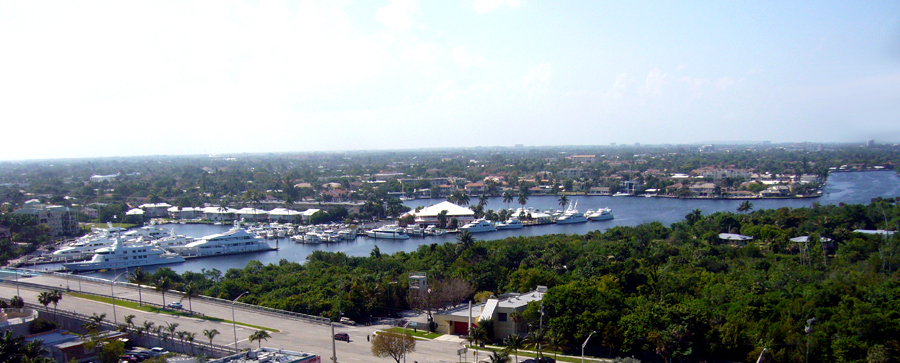
- Intracoastal Waterway at Sunrise Boulevard, Fort Lauderdale, Florida, 2010
- Interactive map of Intracoastal Waterway
- Country: United States

Specifications
- Length: 3,000 miles (4,800 km)

History
- Date completed: June 18, 1949

Geography
- Start point: Annisquam River
- End point: Brownsville, Texas
- Branch: Gulf Intracoastal Waterway
- Connects to: Atlantic portion Gulf portion

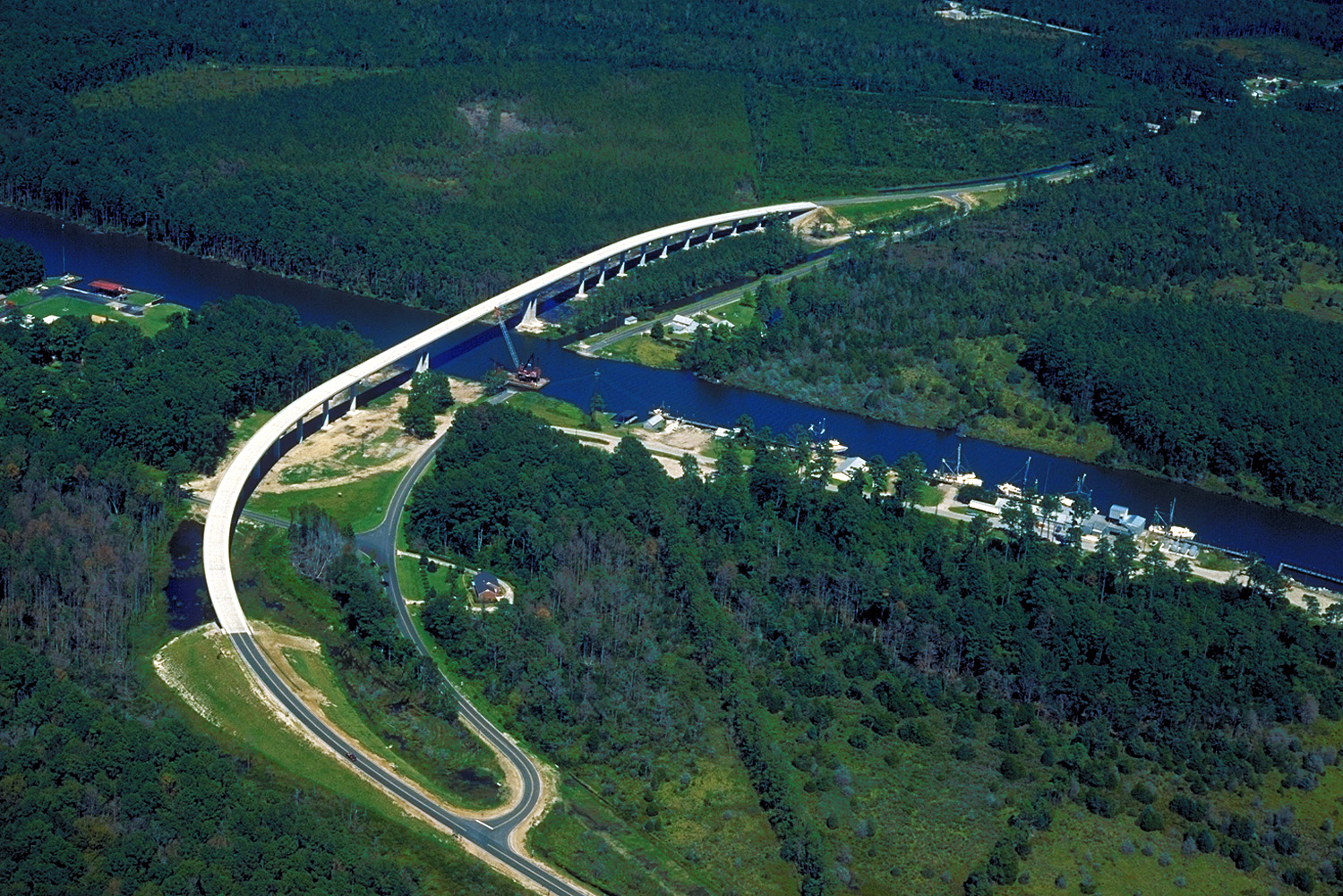
A section of the Intracoastal Waterway in Pamlico County, North Carolina, crossed by the Hobucken Bridge

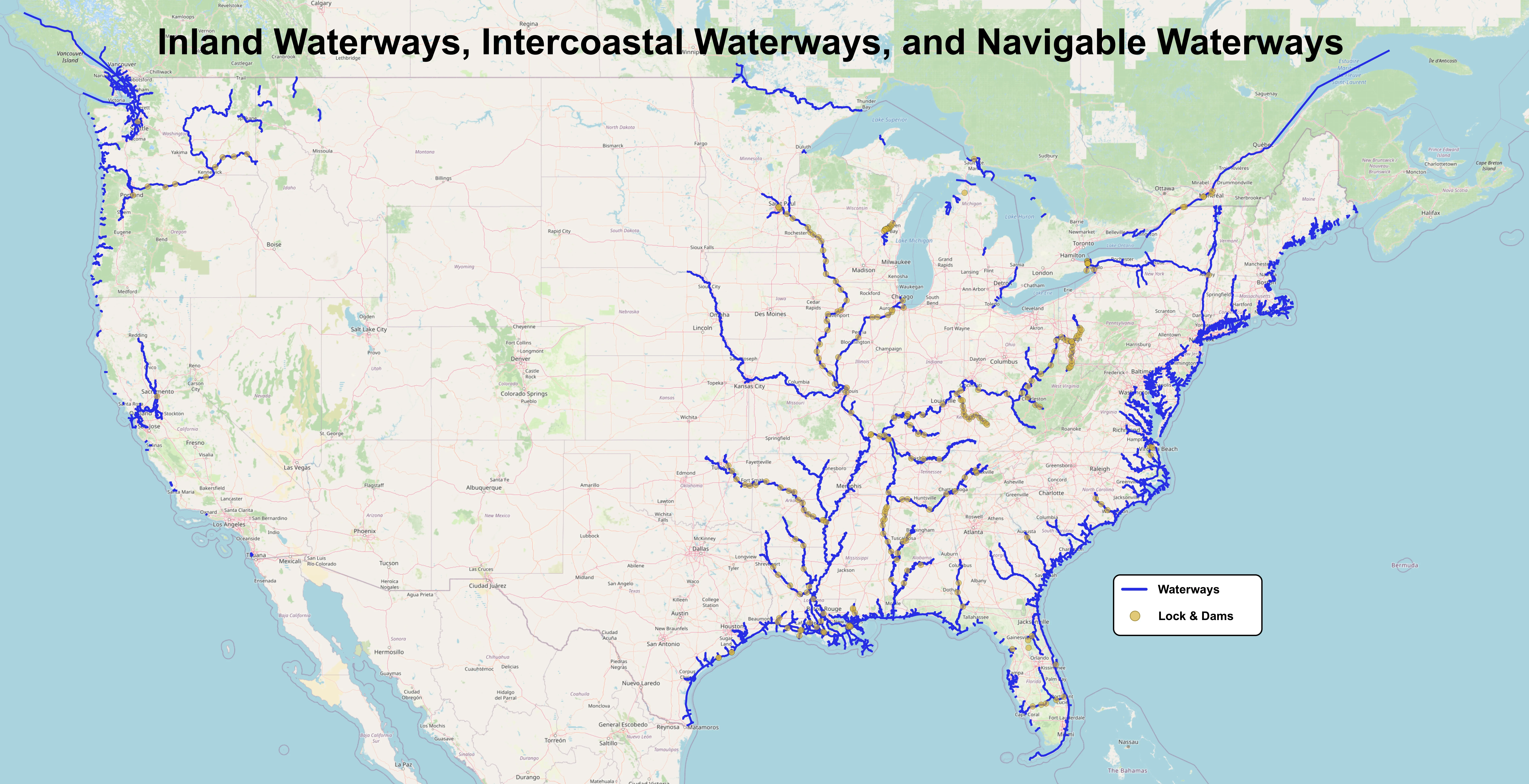
Inland waterways, intracoastal waterways, and navigable waterways

The Intracoastal Waterway (ICW) is a 3,000-mile (4,800 km) inland waterway along the Atlantic and Gulf of Mexico coasts of the United States, running from Massachusetts southward along the Atlantic Seaboard and around the southern tip of Florida, then following the Gulf Coast to Brownsville, Texas. Some sections of the waterway consist of natural inlets, saltwater rivers, bays, and sounds, while others are artificial canals. Maintained, improved, and extensively dredged where necessary by the United States Army Corps of Engineers, it provides a navigable route along its length without many of the hazards of travel on the open sea.

== Context and early history ==
Since the Eastern coastline represented the national border, and commerce of the time was chiefly by water, the fledgling United States government established a degree of national control over it. Inland transportation to supply the coasting trade at the time was less known and virtually undeveloped, but when new lands and their favorable river systems were added with the Northwest Territory in 1787, the Northwest Ordinance established a radically new and free national policy for their development and transportation use.

Over time, internal improvements of natural coastal and inland waterways would develop into the Great Loop, which allows for waterborne circumnavigation of the eastern continental United States, using minimal ocean travel, with the Intracoastal Waterway providing its eastern end. In 1808, the first federal government report on existing, possible, and likely avenues of transportation improvement was presented; it included much of the distance where the ICW now traverses the Atlantic coast. At the request of the Senate, Treasury Secretary Albert Gallatin presented an overall plan for future transportation developments of national importance and scope. Along with inland east–west improvements, Gallatin's north–south improvements included the following:

The map of the United States will show that they possess a tide water inland navigation, secure from storms and enemies, and which, from Massachusetts to the southern extremity of Georgia, is principally, if not solely, interrupted by four necks of land. These are the Isthmus of Barnstable, that part of New Jersey which extends from the Raritan to the Delaware, the peninsula between the Delaware and the Chesapeake, and that low and marshy tract which divides the Chesapeake from Albemarle Sound. ... Should this great work, the expense of which, as will hereafter be shown, is estimated at about three millions of dollars, be accomplished, a sea vessel entering the first canal in the harbor of Boston would, through the bay of Rhode Island, Long Island Sound, and the harbor of New York, reach Brunswick on the Raritan; thence pass through the second canal to Trenton on the Delaware, down that river to Christiana or Newcastle, and through the third canal to Elk River and the Chesapeake, whence, sailing down that bay and up Elizabeth River, it would, through the fourth canal, enter the Albemarle Sound, and by Pamlico, Core, and Bogue sounds, reach Beaufort and Swansboro in North Carolina. From the last-mentioned place, the inland navigation, through Stumpy and Toomer's sounds, is continued until a diminished draught of water, and by cutting two low and narrow necks, not exceeding three miles together, to Cape Fear River, and thence by an open but short and direct run along the coast is reached that chain of islands between which and the main the inland navigation is continued, to St. Marys along the coast of South Carolina and Georgia. It is unnecessary to add any comments on the utility of the work, in peace or war, for the transportation of merchandise or the conveyance of persons.

While Gallatin discussed the details of engineering, construction, and costs, including the national benefits to accrue from lowered transportation costs between domestic and international markets, his full $20 million, 10-year plan was never approved. That is not to say his plan was never implemented, however, for with experience in the War of 1812 shortly thereafter and the attendant British blockade, the continued need for such facility was soon highlighted. Since Gallatin had based his proposals on the known advantageous natural geographic features of the country, many of his proposals became the locations of navigation improvements that were surveyed, authorized, and constructed starting with the 1824 General Survey Act and the first of many pieces of rivers and harbors legislation, as well by individual state-built improvements.

Since these 1824 acts, the United States Army Corps of Engineers (USACE) has responsibility for navigation waterway improvements and maintenance. All four proposed sections of Gallatin's intracoastal plan were eventually built; the Delaware and Raritan Canal was later abandoned for alternative infrastructure, but the Cape Cod Canal remains in operation, and the Delaware and the Dismal Swamp portions still form part of the larger present-day Intracoastal Waterway.

== 19th-century growth ==
In 1826, Congress authorized the first survey for an inland canal between the Atlantic Ocean and Gulf of Mexico. After the Civil War, government funding shifted from waterways to railroads; still, coastal improvements authorized for development included the Houston Ship Channel and the Delaware River in 1872. The following year, the Senate's Select Committee on Transportation Routes to the Seaboard looked at the need for more haulage capacity to move freight to the coasts. But their "Report of Windom Select Committee" their plans and recommendations "received less attention than was anticipated, of course by reason of the rapid growth of interest in railways".

In the River and Harbors Appropriations Acts of 1882 and 1884, Congress signaled its intent to improve waterways to benefit the nation by promoting competition among transportation modes. The 1882 act was the first act of Congress to combine appropriations for development of the nation's waterways with a reaffirmation of the policy of freedom from tolls and other user charges, first stated in 1787; it was passed over President Chester Arthur's veto, who considered it a waste of the federal government's growing budget surplus. In 1887, the Interstate Commerce Act established federal regulation of railroads; Congress continued to promote freedom from tolls or special taxes on waterways. In 1890, Congress passed the Sherman Antitrust Act, the first federal statute to limit cartels and monopolies, but the federal government used it minimally until Theodore Roosevelt's presidency more than 10 years later.

Continued insufficient capacity of railroad transportation became apparent following the harvest of 1906.

== 20th-century developments ==
The invention of the diesel engine in 1892 eventually led to the conversion of fuels for transportation from coal and steam to diesel and the internal combustion engine. The Rivers and Harbors Act of 1909 set national policy for an intracoastal waterway from Boston to the Rio Grande, and the Rivers and Harbors Act of 1910 authorized a 9-by-100-foot (2.7 m × 30.5 m) channel on the Gulf Intracoastal Waterway between the Apalachicola River and St. Andrews Bay, Florida (completed in 1936), as well as a study of the most efficient means to move cargo. Between 1910 and 1914, navigation channels were deepened, and the screw propeller proved efficient for improved steering and flanking qualities. The Panama Canal Act was passed in 1911, which proved key to the revival of waterway transportation in the United States, because the opening of Panama Canal in 1914 allowed coastal shipping to extend to the U.S. West Coast for the first time. The law also prohibited railroads from owning, controlling, or operating a water carrier through the canal and led to succeeding legislation that eliminated monopoly of transportation modes by railroads. The country's World War I experience demonstrated the need for bulk cargo transportation, with Congress establishing the federal barge lines and spurring development of cheaper ways to transport farm commodities, including the first use of standardized freight barges.

In 1924, Congress incorporated the Inland Waterways Corporation, generally regarded as the beginning of modern water carrier operations, and in 1925, it authorized construction of the Louisiana and Texas Intracoastal Waterway, as well as surveys east of New Orleans to Apalachicola Bay; this was the first legislation to treat the ICW as a continuous whole. The River and Harbor Act of 1927 authorized the portion of the Atlantic Intracoastal Waterway, using the route planned out by the Jacksonville District of the Corps of Engineers. During World War II, the need for efficient transportation of bulk materials within the continental United States was well demonstrated after German submarines sank numerous merchant ships off the East Coast. By 1942, the 9 ft × 100 ft (2.7 m × 30.5 m) ICW channel was completed between New Orleans and Corpus Christi.

Today, federal law provides for the waterway to be maintained at a minimum depth of 12 feet (3.7 m) for most of its length, but inadequate funding has prevented that. Consequently, for larger ships, shoaling or shallow waters are encountered along several sections of the waterway, with these having 7-foot (2.1 m) or 9-foot (2.7 m) minimum depths from earlier improvements. While no tolls are charged for waterway usage, commercial users have been charged a fuel tax since 1978, which is used to maintain and improve facilities. That year, the Inland Waterways Revenue Act imposed a barge fuel tax; originally set at 4 cents per gallon in 1980, it was gradually raised to 10 cents per gallon by 1986. To hold these funds, the act also created the Inland Waterways Trust Fund under the U.S. Treasury, which are used to cover half the cost of new construction and major rehabilitation of the inland waterways infrastructure (33 U.S.C. ch.32). The Water Resources Development Act of 1986 was a wide-ranging bill regarding all water resources utilization nationally. Concerning transportation on waterways, this law established the Inland Waterways Users Board to make recommendations regarding construction and rehabilitation priorities and spending levels for the inland waterways, and also gradually increased the incremental fuel tax to 20 cents per gallon by 1995.

== Current route ==
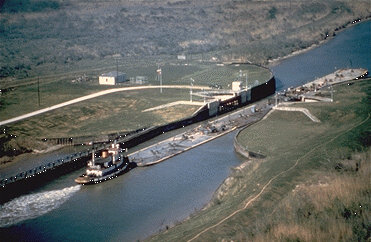
Tug and barge passing through the Colorado River Locks on the Gulf Intracoastal Waterway near Matagorda, Texas

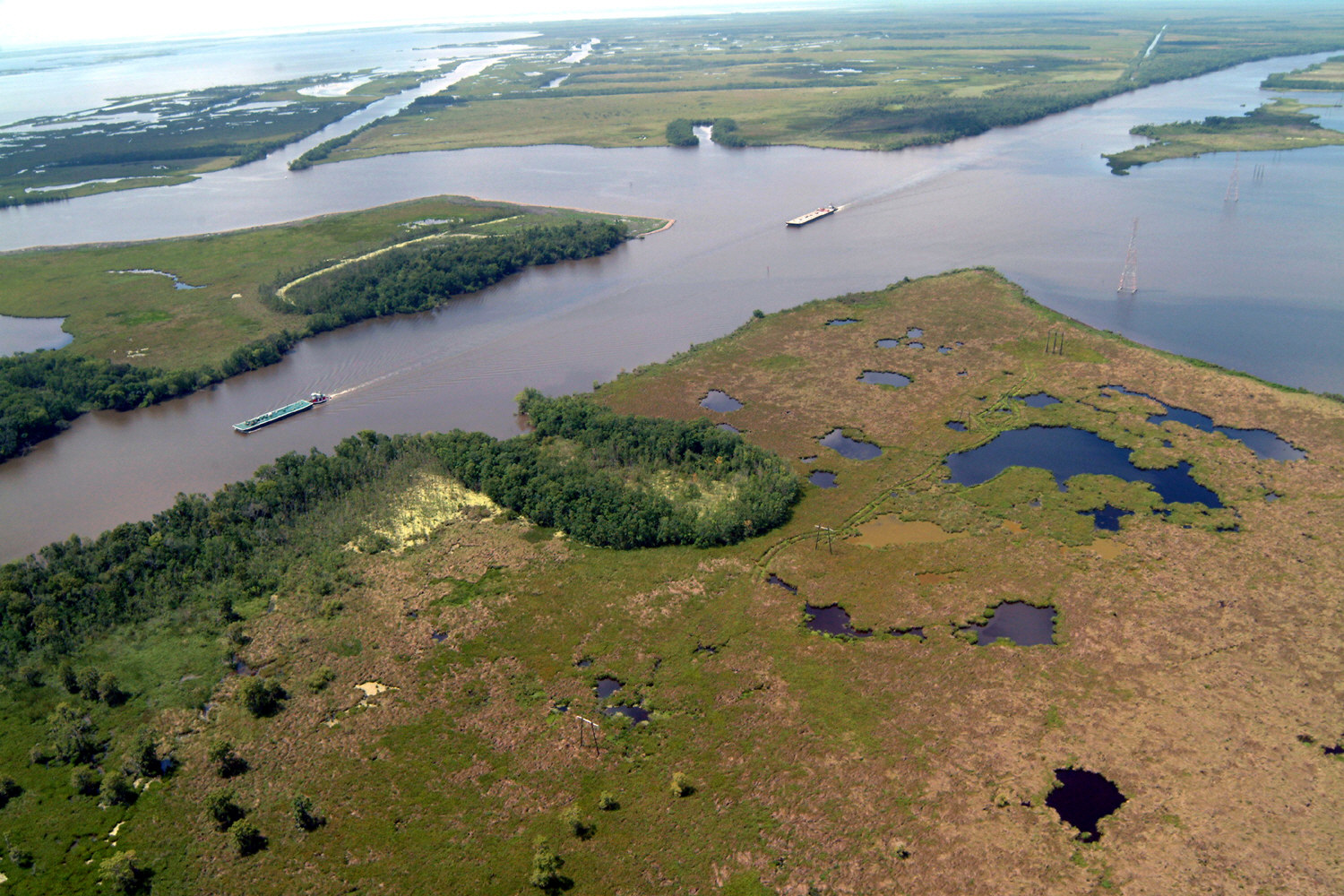
Navigation on the Gulf Intracoastal Waterway, where it intersects with Bayou Perot, in the vicinity of New Orleans

The Intracoastal Waterway runs for most of the length of the Eastern Seaboard. The waterway consists of three non-contiguous segments: from Brownsville, Texas, east to Carrabelle, Florida; from Tarpon Springs, Florida, south to Fort Myers, Florida; and from Key West, Florida, north to Portsmouth, Virginia (milepost 0.0). The first and second sections are collectively referred to as the Gulf Intracoastal Waterway, and the third is referred to as the Atlantic Intracoastal Waterway (AIWW). The first and second sections were intended to be connected via a dredged waterway from Tarpon Springs to St. Marks, Florida (which is near Carrabelle), and the second and third sections were intended to be connected via the Cross Florida Barge Canal across northern Florida. These projects were never completed because of environmental concerns. Additional canals and bays extend a navigable waterway north of Portsmouth. North of the Manasquan Inlet connecting the Manasquan River in New Jersey with the Atlantic Ocean the route is coastal, traversing the balance of New Jersey offshore, New York Bay, the East River, Long Island Sound, Block Island Sound, Rhode Island Sound, Buzzards Bay, the Cape Cod Canal, Cape Cod Bay, and Massachusetts Bay before reaching an approximately 5 mile inland passage to its official terminus point, Annisquam, Massachusetts, via the Annisquam River, a U.S. Army Corps maintained channel 26 miles (42 km) northeast of Boston connecting Gloucester and Annisquam.

However, vessels drawing less than about 12 ft (3.7 m) but more than 6 ft (1.8 m) can also follow the New Jersey Intracoastal Waterway, an inland segment of the Atlantic ICW that runs 117.7 miles (189 km) from Manasquan Inlet through the Point Pleasant Canal, Barnegat Bay and a series of bays and inlets to Cape May Harbor and on to Delaware Bay via the Cape May Canal. This shallow‑draft waterway is part of the federal ICW system but is often omitted from the mainline description because larger commercial vessels typically continue offshore.

The Intracoastal Waterway sees a large amount of commercial activity: barges haul petroleum and petroleum products, foodstuffs, building materials, and manufactured goods. It is also used extensively by recreational boaters. On the east coast, some of the traffic in fall and spring is composed of snowbirds who regularly move south in winter and north in summer. The waterway is also used when the ocean is too rough for travel.

Numerous inlets connect the Atlantic and the Gulf of Mexico with the Intracoastal Waterway. The Intracoastal Waterway connects to several navigable rivers where shipping traffic can travel to inland ports, including the Mississippi, Alabama, Savannah, James, Delaware, Hudson, and Connecticut rivers. The St. Lawrence Seaway and Great Lakes can be accessed via connections with the Hudson River and Erie Canal, and via the Mississippi and Illinois Rivers and the Chicago Sanitary and Ship Canal and Cal-Sag Channel.

== Natural bodies of water ==
The following natural bodies of water are included in or connect with the Intracoastal Waterway system:

- Albemarle Sound
- Amelia River
- Annisquam River
- Apalachicola Bay
- St. Andrews Bay
- Aransas Bay
- Barnegat Bay
- Biscayne Bay
- Boca Ciega Bay
- Bogue Sound
- Bon Secour Bay
- Buzzards Bay
- Cape Cod Bay
- Cape Fear River
- Charleston Harbor
- Charlotte Harbor
- Chesapeake Bay
- Choctawhatchee Bay
- Connecticut River
- Corpus Christi Bay
- Delaware Bay
- East River
- Elizabeth River
- Florida Bay
- Galveston Bay
- Gulf of Maine
- Halifax River
- Hampton Roads
- Hudson River
- Indian River Lagoon
- Ipswitch Bay
- Laguna Madre
- Lake Cocodrie
- Lake Worth Lagoon
- Little River
- Long Island Sound
- Lower New York Bay
- Mobile Bay
- Matagorda Bay
- Mississippi Sound
- Narragansett Bay
- Pamlico Sound
- Pensacola Bay
- Perdido Bay
- Sabine Lake
- San Antonio Bay
- Sarasota Bay
- Shallotte River
- The Narrows
- Toms River
- Upper New York Bay
- Waccamaw River
- Winyah Bay

== East Coast canals ==
=== Major freight canals ===
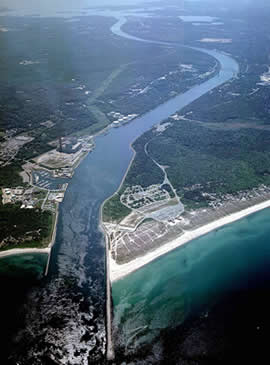
Aerial photo of the Cape Cod Canal and Scusset Beach State Reservation in southeastern Massachusetts

- Cape Cod Canal
- Chesapeake and Delaware Canal

=== Other canals ===
- Albemarle and Chesapeake Canal
- Alligator-Pungo Canal
- Assawoman Canal
- Dismal Swamp Canal
- Cape May Canal
- Delaware and Raritan Canal – no longer operational or part of the Intracoastal Waterway
- Okeechobee Waterway
- Point Pleasant Canal
- Lewes and Rehoboth Canal

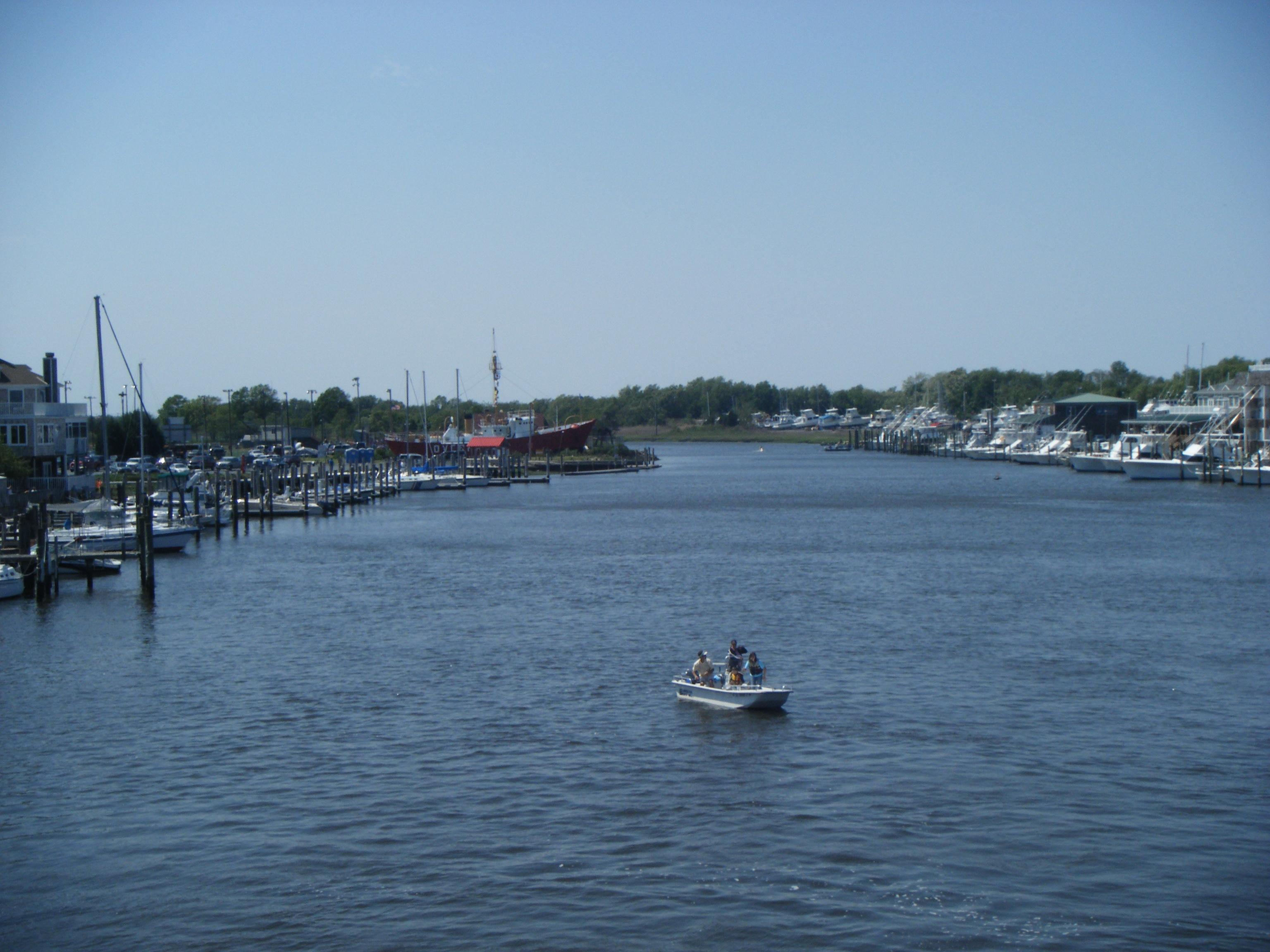
Lewes and Rehoboth Canal in Lewes, Delaware

== See also ==
- Inland waterways of the United States
- Waterways forming and crossings of the Atlantic Intracoastal Waterway
- Waterways forming and crossings of the Gulf Intracoastal Waterway
