= Silver Bay =

Silver Bay may refer to:

- Silver Bay (Alaska), a fjord located south of the town of Sitka
- Silver Bay, Minnesota, a small city
- Silver Bay (New Jersey), a bay located near Silverton, New Jersey
- Silver Bay, New York, a hamlet
- Silver Bay, Ontario, a community within Port Colborne
