= Barnegat Bay =

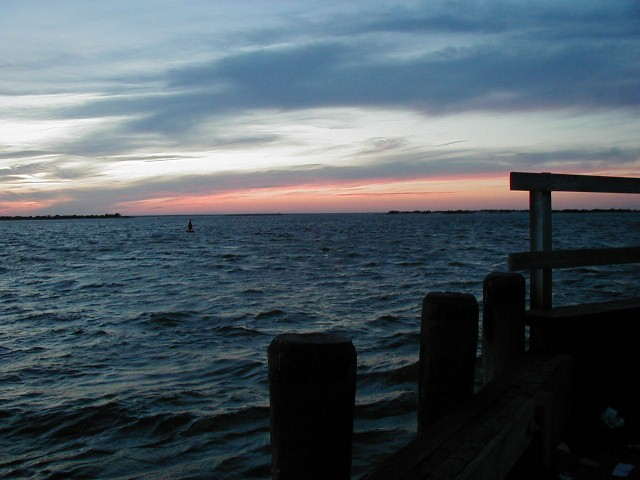
- Looking north-northwest from Barnegat Light toward mainland New Jersey.

- Location within New Jersey
- Location: New Jersey
- Coordinates: 39.820°N 74.126°W
- Type: Bay

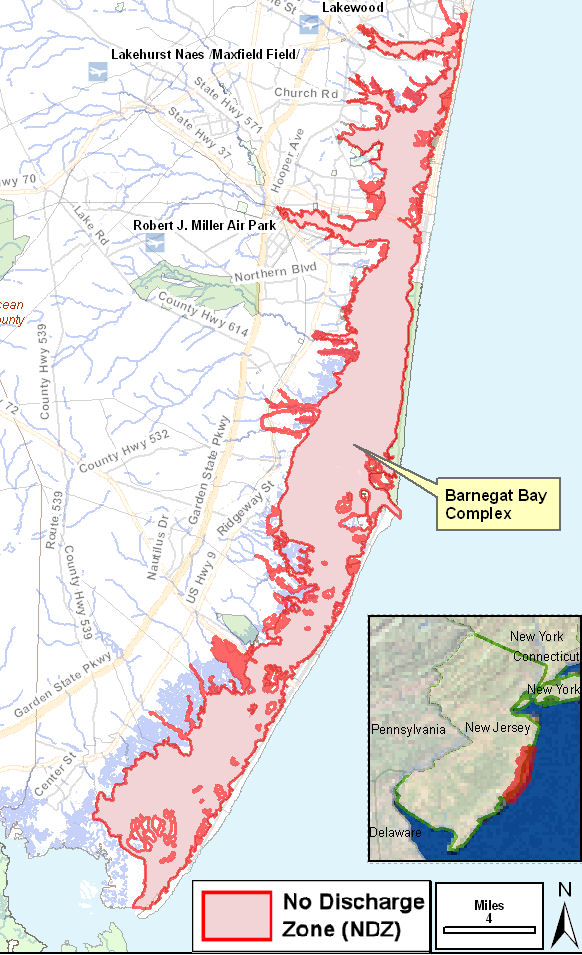
Map of Barnegat Bay area which is also declared as a No Discharge Zone by USEPA

Barnegat Bay is a small brackish arm of the Atlantic Ocean, approximately 42 miles (68 km) long, along the coast of Ocean County, New Jersey in the United States. It is separated from the Atlantic by the long Island Beach State Park (colloquially called a barrier island), as well as by the north end of Long Beach Island, popular segments of the Jersey Shore. The bay is fed by several small rivers, including the Toms River, the Forked River, the Metedeconk River, Cedar Creek, Oyster Creek, Mill Creek, Westecunk Creek, and Tuckerton Creek, all of which empty into the bay through small estuaries along its inner shore. The communities of Toms River, Silverton, and Forked River sit along the river estuaries on the bay.

The bay connects with the ocean through the Barnegat Inlet, along which sits the Barnegat Lighthouse. The bay is part of the Atlantic Intracoastal Waterway (as the New Jersey Intracoastal Waterway), entered on its north end by the Point Pleasant Canal and connecting on the south end with Little Egg Harbor via the small Manahawkin Bay. In a broader sense, Barnegat Bay is sometimes considered to stretch to the south end of Long Beach Island and to include Little Egg Harbor.

Three bridges span the bay from the mainland to the peninsula: the Mantoloking Bridge from Brick Township to Mantoloking, and the Thomas A. Mathis and J. Stanley Tunney Bridges from Toms River to Ortley Beach. The Barnegat Division of Edwin B. Forsythe National Wildlife Refuge comprises wetlands along the inner southern part of the bay. Along the outside of the bay, on the peninsula, is the Island Beach State Park. Various islands within the bay are a part of the National Wildlife Refuge or the Sedge Islands State Wildlife Management Area. The northern tip of Long Beach Island includes the Barnegat Lighthouse State Park.

== History ==
The area surrounding Barnegat Bay and Barnegat Inlet was described by Henry Hudson, in 1609, as "... a great lake of water, as we could judge it to be ... The mouth of the lake hath many shoals, and the sea breaketh on them as it is cast out of the mouth of it." The bay was originally named in 1614 "Barendegat," or "Inlet of the Breakers," by Dutch explorers of the coastline, referring to the waterway's turbulent channel. During the American Revolutionary War, the bay was used as refuge by American privateers.

Sunset over Barnegat Bay and the marinas of Bay Head, looking west-southwest, September 2025

The bay has been a longtime center for commercial fishing. The village of Toms River was a significant whaling port in the 19th century. While still popular for fishing, Barnegat Bay has also become a popular destination for recreational boating. The water quality of the bay has been degraded by pollution in the rivers and creeks that feed it. The preservation of the bay's water quality has been an ongoing effort of several public and private organizations.

The bay was immortalized by the famous writer E. B. White, who used it as a setting for his short story "The Family That Dwelt Apart", published in 1937 as the third story in his long running Preposterous Parables series in The New Yorker. It was adapted into the animated short The Family That Dwelt Apart, narrated by White, by the National Film Board of Canada.

The song "My Eyes Adored You", by New Jersey native Frankie Valli, contains a reference to "walking home every day over Barnegat Bridge and Bay". On March 22, 1975, the song became a Billboard No. 1 hit.

The Trust for Public Land, a national land conservation group, has done extensive work in the Barnegat Bay area for over two decades, protecting over 1,100 acres (4.5 km^{2}) of land. The Trust recently began the new River to Bay Greenway, the primary goal of which is to create a 70-mile (110 km) multi-use recreational route across southern New Jersey from the Delaware River to Barnegat Bay.

== Environmental problems ==
In the 2000s and 2010s, scientists and residents have drawn attention to fish kills, algal blooms, low dissolved oxygen levels, loss of habitat, diminishing clam populations, and the rise in stinging Chrysaora quinquecirrha (sea nettle jellyfish) populations in the bay, mainly due to high levels of nitrogen from fertilizer runoff. The U.S. Environmental Protection Agency monitors the health of the bay by testing at four locations as frequently as once a week in the summer months, when surface water can reach 82 °F (28 °C).

Community members have also expressed concern over the impact of stored radioactive material and thermal pollution at the Oyster Creek Nuclear Generating Station in Lacey Township. The plant which was built in 1969 was formerly the oldest operating nuclear power plant in the United States. The plant was decommissioned on September 25, 2018.

=== Pollution ===
A 2008 baseline sediment pollution study of 15 locations within Barnegat Bay - Little Egg Harbor area including sites at Mill Creek, Cedar Run, Parker Run measured total petroleum hydrocarbons, mercury, polyaromatic hydrocarbons (PAH) and polychlorinated biphenyls (PCB). The joint US/UK team of scientists reported that TPH content was low and that mercury content ranged from <0.02 to 2.61 mg/kg dry wt. PAH content ranged from as low as 37 ug/kg to 1696 ug/kg with the highest concentrations at Tuckerton Creek, nevertheless these concentrations are not considered harmful to humans or biota. The distribution pattern of PAHs throughout the study area was consistent with the burning from grass, wood and coal sources. Concentrations of PCB were below reported effects ranges suggesting a low risk.

== Islands ==
Middle Sedge Island in Barnegat Bay is a 25-acre (0.10 km^{2}) island, 14 acres (0.057 km^{2}) of which are developed with a single house. Other islands include: Little Sedge Island, Northwest Point Island and Marsh Elder Island. Some are privately owned and some are owned by the state of New Jersey.

== Pop culture references ==
Frankie Valli’s song "My Eyes Adored You" references the location in the lyrics saying "... over Barnegat Bridge and Bay...".

In the television show The Sopranos, Tony Soprano owns a boat frequently set and docked along Barnegat Bay.
