= New Jersey Route 13 =

State highway in New Jersey, US

Route 13
- Bridge Avenue

Route information
- Maintained by NJDOT
- Length: 0.56 mi (900 m)
- Existed: 1953–present

Major junctions
- West end: CR 632 in Point Pleasant
- East end: CR 632 in Bay Head

Location
- Country: United States
- State: New Jersey
- Counties: Ocean

Highway system
- New Jersey State Highway Routes; Interstate; US; State; Scenic Byways
← Route 12	→ Route 14

Route 13 is a short state highway in the communities of Point Pleasant and Bay Head, New Jersey, both of which are in Ocean County. The route consists of the Lovelandtown Bridge, a vertical-lift bridge over the Point Pleasant Canal, and a part of Bridge Avenue, which is mostly maintained by the county as County Route 632 (CR 632). The route was unsigned until new mileposts were installed in 2017. Route 13 was designated in the 1953 New Jersey state highway renumbering as a re-designation of Route 13E from Hollywood Boulevard to Bay Avenue.

The route was first assigned in 1938, when the state took over maintenance of the fifth segment of Ocean County Route 13 built in 1929, intending it to reach old Route 37 (now part of Route 35) in Bay Head from Beaver Dam Road, a distance of 1.76 miles (2.83 km). The takeover did not reach that point, and the bridge and its approaches count for 0.56 miles (0.90 km) of the intended length. The original bridge collapsed in 1962, and a temporary structure was erected later that year. Planning for a permanent replacement bridge continued for several years until construction finally began in 1970. This structure opened in 1972, but closed immediately afterward due to a failure of the lift mechanism, which was fixed by the end of the year. In late 2004, the bridge and its approaches received a rehabilitation.

== Route description ==
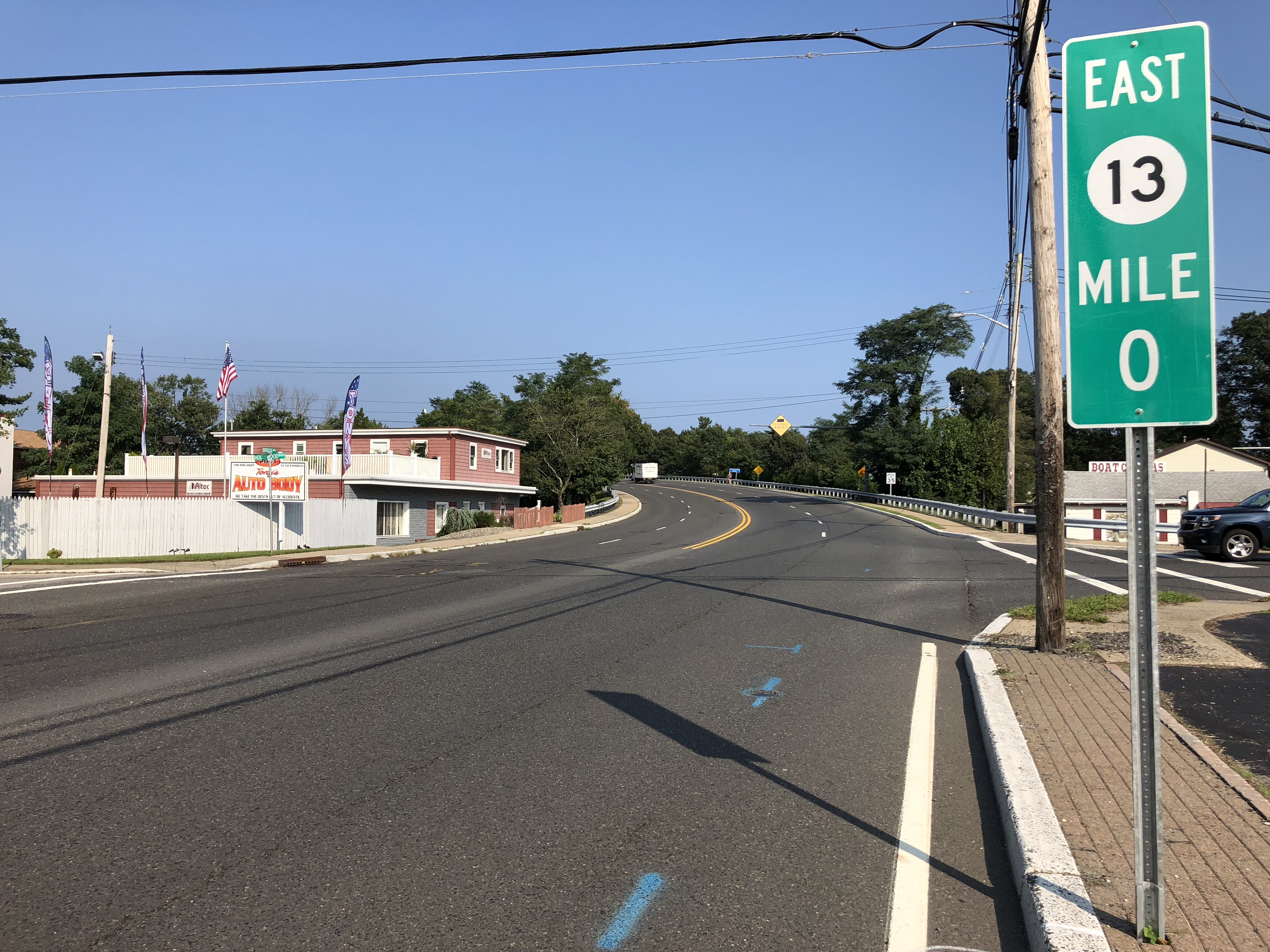
View east at milepost 0 at the west end of Route 13 in Point Pleasant

Route 13 begins at an intersection where CR 632 meets Hollywood Boulevard in Point Pleasant. There, the state-maintenance begins. The route heads eastward along Bridge Avenue, passing to the south of local businesses and to the north of local residences. There, Route 13 begins a curve to the northeast onto the Lovelandtown Bridge approach, passing a marina before reaching the Point Pleasant Canal (part of the Intracoastal Waterway) and heading onto a lift bridge called the Lovelandtown Bridge. After crossing the canal, Route 13 parallels Elm Avenue for a short distance before turning away to the southeast. The route heads into downtown Bay Head, where it reaches an intersection with Bay Avenue, which is its eastern terminus. CR 632 continues eastward to Route 35. Route 13 is concurrent with CR 632 for its entire length.

== History ==
=== Designation ===
Route 13E
- Location: Bay Head
- Existed: July 2, 1938–1953

Originally, the Lovelandtown Bridge was constructed in 1929 to create a continuous route along Bridge Avenue. Route 13 originated as an alignment of Ocean County Route 13-E, a highway maintained by the county. In 1938, the state legislated a takeover of the fifth segment of the county route, a portion of highway from old Route 37 (now part of Route 35) at Bay Head to an intersection with Beaver Dam Road, including the Lovelandtown Bridge. The route was to be 1.76 miles (2.83 km) long, and the designation came into effect on July 2, 1938. However, the extension to Route 37 was never constructed. In the 1953 renumbering, the state dropped the suffix and renumbered the bridge and its approaches as Route 13. (Incidentally, the portion of Route 37 within Bay Head—running from Point Pleasant to Seaside Heights—was renumbered as Route 35 during the same highway renumbering.)

=== Lovelandtown Bridge rebuild ===
==== Collapse and demands for new bridge (1962–1964) ====
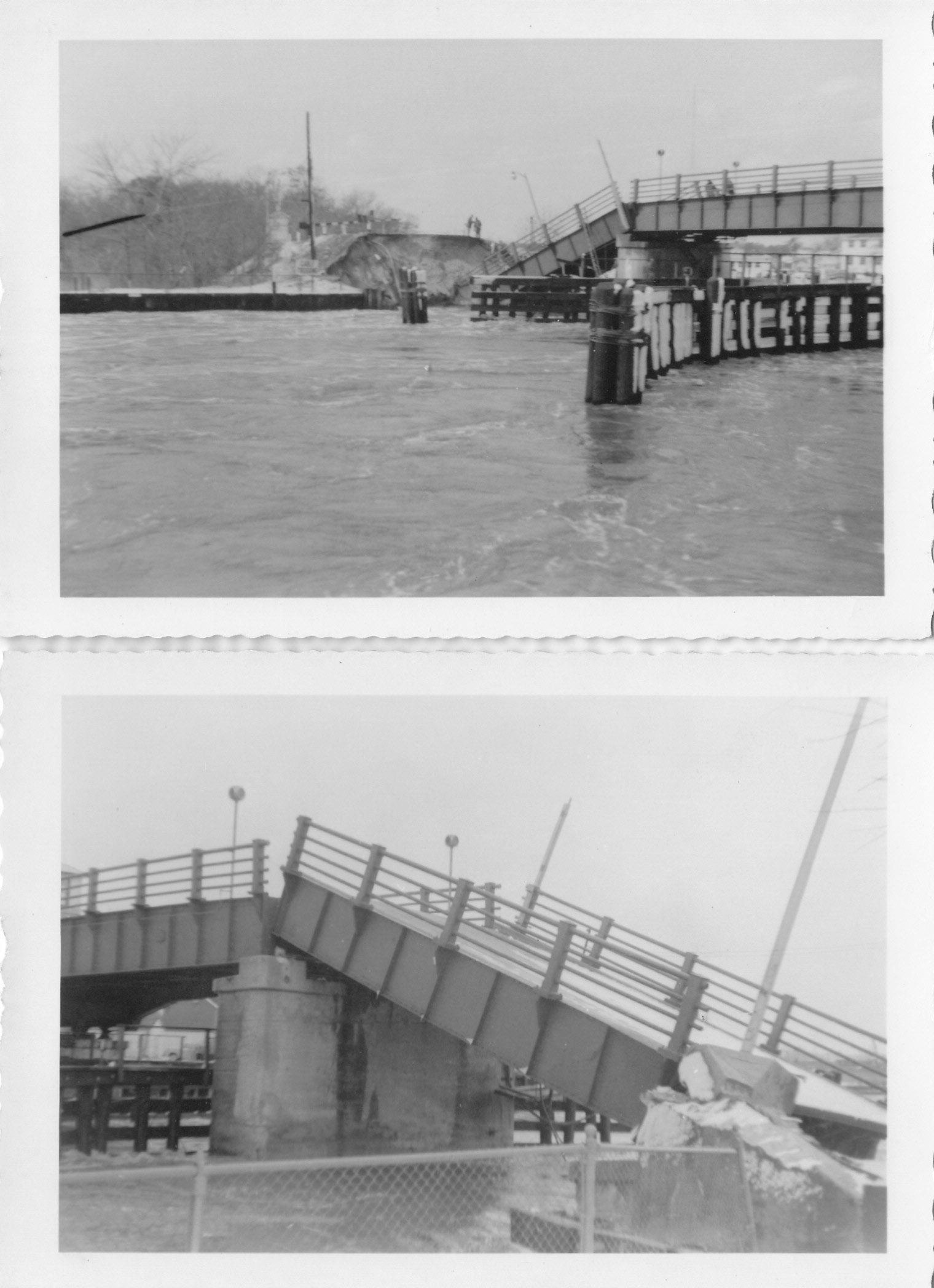
The damaged sections of the old Lovelandtown Bridge

By 1960, the usefulness of the Lovelandtown Bridge came into question. The New Jersey State Highway Department felt that the bridge was structurally safe and able to support up to 20 tons (18.14 tonnes). However, local officials felt the bridge was unsafe, especially for vehicles such as school buses. Additionally, the bridge, which was supported by wooden pilings, was starting to fail and erode. The expected failure occurred during the Ash Wednesday Storm of 1962 on March 5, when the storm and tides on the Intracostal Waterway wiped out a section of the bridge. A temporary structure to replace the bridge opened in May 1962.

In the meantime, proposals were made for a permanent replacement structure. Early proposals noted the bridge would take about three months to rebuild. Point Pleasant Police Chief William Beecroft, who voiced concerns about the integrity of the bridge in 1960 and 1962, proposed a new tunnel across the Intracoastal Waterway to replace the Route 88 and Route 13 bridges. Beecroft speculated that the new tunnel would be cheaper to build in the long run and make things easier for emergency vehicles who would not have to deal with drawbridges. The State Highway Department considered a new tunnel for Route 13, but quickly discarded the idea by October due to excessive costs, though Beecroft would bring it up again as an option if there were a hearing.

In November 1962, the State Highway Department made plans to build a new 45 feet (14 m) high fixed structure over the waterway. However, this plan was opposed by multiple agencies and individuals because yachts would be unable to use the waterway with a fixed structure. One of these was Assemblyman William T. Hiering, a Republican from Ocean County who asked the United States Army Corps of Engineers to hold a public hearing on such a bridge; this hearing would occur on December 27. However, the State Highway Department also supported an option for a 30 feet (9.1 m) high drawbridge that would accommodate yacht users and only have to be opened once in a while. Such a plan would cost about $2 million.

By February 1964, the State Highway Department switched its plan to a vertical-lift bridge. This new bridge would be able to open to as high as 100 feet (30 m) in the air and allow room for yachts to go through. The delay in action by the Highway Department was being slammed by the borough of Point Pleasant by December 1964. Dr. Ronald V. Crescenzo, one of the members of the borough council wanted a bus ban over the replaced structure until a new one could be built. The borough also wanted to be absolved of any responsibility and liability in case of another structural failure. They did, however, support a new vertical-lift bridge with the 25 feet (7.6 m) high lift that could raise to 70 feet (21 m) in the air.

==== Added pressure (1965–1966) ====
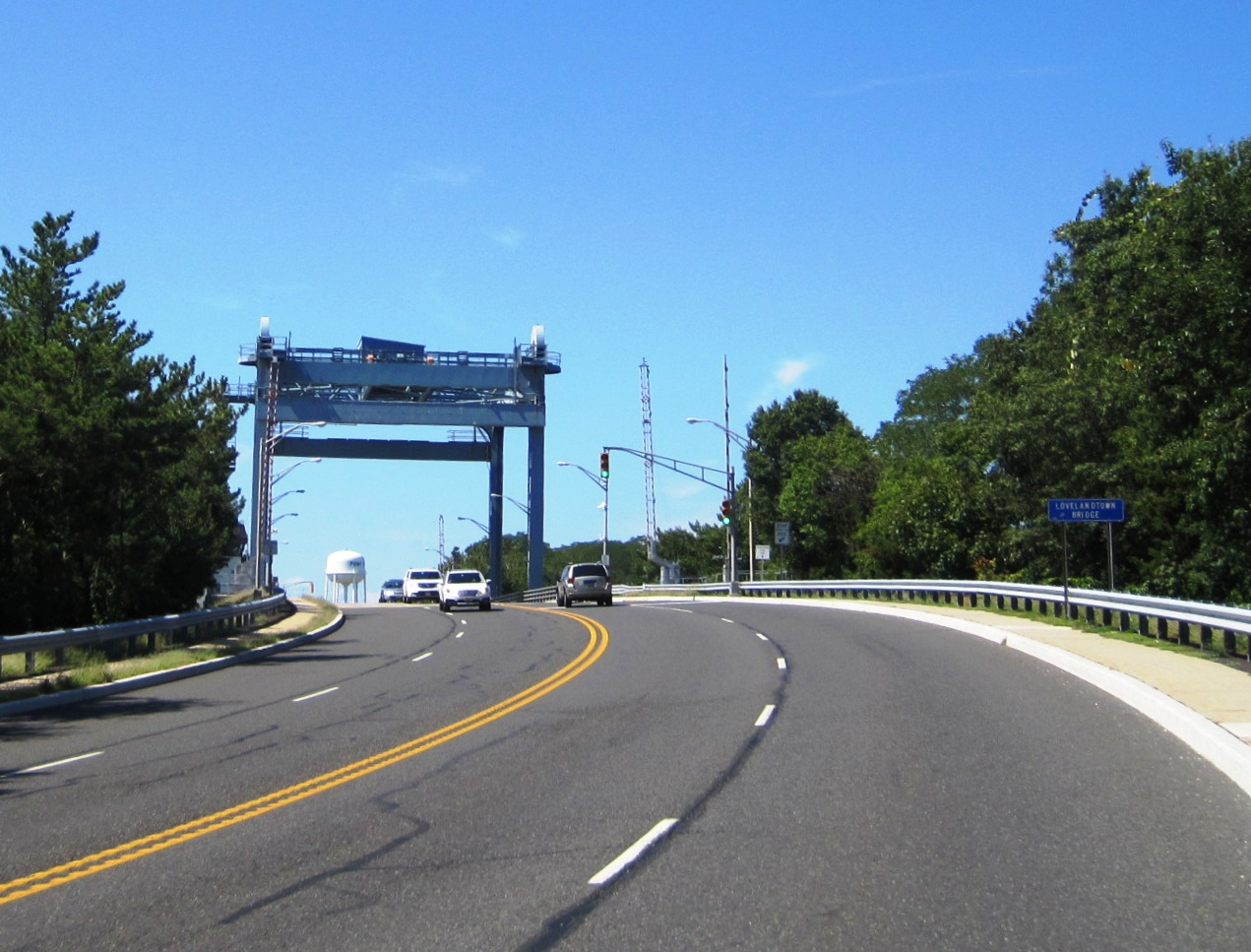
Heading westbound onto the Lovelandtown Bridge, which is most of Route 13's alignment

More complaints came from higher officials in September 1965, when a resident of Fair Lawn drove off the temporary Lovelandtown Bridge and died. The car crashed through the wooden railings of the bridge and landed in the canal below. The driver's death sparked the attention of State Senator Wayne Dumont and Point Pleasant Mayor Walter B. Brown; they deemed the bridge a traffic hazard and pressured Governor Richard J. Hughes to speed up construction. Dumont also claimed that the previous governor's administration provided money for the new bridge. However, the State Highway Department claimed that no money was ever allocated for such use.

In December 1965, the borough of Point Pleasant noted that meetings between them, Ocean County and the State Highway Department would be conducted on December 9 or December 16, to discuss a new Lovelandtown Bridge. Chief Beecroft, who previously wanted a tunnel crossing, noted buses were taken off the temporary structure for safety. By December 3, Point Pleasant announced that the meeting would take place on December 16.

In January 1966, the New Jersey State Conservation Department approved the plans of the State Highway Department for the construction of a new Lovelandtown Bridge. This new bridge would need a 60 feet (18 m) horizontal clearance and a vertical clearance of 65 feet (20 m) to help navigation through the canal. Bridge Avenue would be moved north for the new bridge, with the construction of a new alignment. This would help eliminate curves that were considered dangerous to the old bridge. However, the bridge was still subject to the approval of a United States Engineer in Philadelphia, Pennsylvania. These plans reached the United States Army Corps of Engineers in April 1966, when they announced openings for anyone who had opposition to the project. By the deadline of May 16, no objections were filed with the engineers on the new bridge.

In July 1966, the state announced that they were ready to begin construction of a new Lovelandtown Bridge, but they would have to wait until the Army Corps of Engineers announced their full approval of the project. The state felt that a new bridge would not be finished until 1968, but would at least get approval within a span of four to six weeks. However, the bridge alignment changed in April to have an 80 feet (24 m) vertical clearance due to new regulations for future expansion of the canal.

==== Design and funding problems (1967–1968) ====
However, despite the four to six week timeline, the Army Corps of Engineers did not sign off on the new Lovelandtown Bridge until January 26, 1967. The new bridge would have a vertical clearance of 30 feet (9.1 m) when closed and 65 feet (20 m) when raised. The span would be 80 feet (24 m) wide for boats and barges to clear. The newly renamed New Jersey Department of Transportation (NJDOT) said design, planning and construction would take about 18 months. Mayor Brown noted that he was happy and was willing to even bring his shovel.

Survey work by the Army Corps of Engineers began in July 1967, for the design of the new bridge over the waterway. NJDOT also hired a New York firm to do the survey work. Less than a month later, the mechanisms to help open the Lovelandtown Bridge to marine traffic broke on August 16, resulting in a seven-hour closure of the bridge and several days of repairs. The Army Corps completed their survey work in the canal in November 1967.

By December 1967, NJDOT moved test borings to the Bureau of Navigation offices to make plans for the new Lovelandtown Bridge ones. The offices would end up being relocated as part of the construction of the new bridge, due to be finished in 1971. The Board of Adjustment chair for the borough of Point Pleasant noted that they should pressure the state to move their schedule up in response to the collapse of the Silver Bridge in Point Pleasant, West Virginia. However, the state announced that they did move their timeline up and expected a replacement to be finished now in 1970, since design problems were avoided during that period. The state also noted that the new bridge would require the condemnation of as many as 20 houses. Drilling into the Point Pleasant Canal began on January 2, 1968, when NJDOT inserted borings for new bridge supports.

However, by September 1968, Point Pleasant wanted to know why the $2 million set aside by the state for construction of the new bridge had been shifted to help facilitate the Aldene Plan in Union County. The new bridge, now costing $4 million (1968 USD), no longer was in the funding for the state. The borough demanded an answer from Governor Hughes, which did not come with answers. Hughes noted that if the state voters passed a new bond issue, the Lovelandtown Bridge would be a top priority. This was in direct conflict with a promise by the State Highway Department in 1966, that money for the new bridge would be non-reliant on a bond issue or other strings. The borough demanded that Commissioner David Goldberg meet with borough officials to get the missing answers.

That meeting would be scheduled for October 8, 1968, at the offices for Goldberg in Trenton, with Mayor Brown heading out to discuss the problems. Brown noted to the press that he wanted $4 million of $114 million earmarked for new railcars as part of the Aldene Plan to be shifted to a new bridge. He also noted that multiple members of the State Legislature, including Senator Hiering, along with Benjamin Mabie and John Brown of the Assembly would introduce legislation to help get funding earmarked immediately for the bridge.

Brown's attitude changed once the meeting with Goldberg ended, feeling that Goldberg had been unsympathetic to their concerns and problems with the change in funding. Brown told the Asbury Park Evening Press that Goldberg gave them a "snow job" and would still force them to rely on the November 5 bond issue of $640 million for transportation work. Mabie, Brown and Hiering noted that they would introduce their response bills once the Legislature reconvened after the election. Goldberg disagreed stating that even if the bond issue failed with the voters, he would have $40 million in funding and the odds of funding would be 5–1 for the project. Mabie, along with Chief Beecroft intended to vote against the bond issue on November 5. Brown, still concerned the bridge was going to fall into the canal again, was refuted by Goldberg who stated it is safe and would close it if he felt it was not.

==== Funding and land acquisition (1968–1969) ====
With the money for the Lovelandtown Bridge construction reliant on passing of the public bond issue, Senator Hiering showed his support for the new bond to help pay for transportation projects. Assemblyman Brown, though not public, opposed the new bond issue. He was concerned that Ocean County would be left out of most of its benefits, and he also felt there was voter discontent. Mabie, however, continued to show his support and optimism for the new bond issue, which passed on November 5, 1968, by 502,415 votes. NJDOT then promised a multitude of projects in Ocean County, including construction on Routes 37 and 72 and the Lovelandtown Bridge.

In January 1969, the New Jersey State Legislature approved to spend $242 million of the new bond issue. $110 million would go to the construction of transportation projects immediately, including the Lovelandtown Bridge. In late January, the state started notifying property owners in the way of the new bridge and approach about the condemnation of their properties. Property owners noted they had 90 days to negotiate with the state about proper return values. The Asbury Park Evening Press noted that nine of the properties were on Partridge Run and the remaining 11 would be west of the canal.

However, Goldberg announced to Ocean County officials that there would be more delays in all projects besides the widening of Route 37 through Toms River until 1970. Despite the report by Goldberg, Assemblyman Brown noted in March 1969 that NJDOT was about ready to announce the advertisement for bids on a new bridge. Brown noted that Goldberg was saying they were moving forward rapidly on the bridge. By April, tax assessors were working on estimating tax values for the properties to be acquired for the new Lovelandtown alignment. By August, the borough approved to sell land along Bridge Avenue for construction of the new bridge.

In September 1969, the state noted that they would be ready to advertise and accept bids on the new project starting in late October 1969. NJDOT said they could have shovels in the ground during 1969 if all went well, including property acquisition. 15 houses would be demolished by the project, but only one had been acquired by September 18, 1969, the one at 1644 Elm Street, once owned by the Federal Housing Administration and would be sold at auction in Cherry Hill. They felt construction would be finished by mid-1971 after starting in December 1969. This did not go according to plan as NJDOT had to file a condemnation lawsuit against James Duff, a property owner along the west side of the canal that was in the way of the new bridge. The request was made to get a three-man panel to come to an agreement on what Duff would be paid for the property for the future western approach.

Despite the lawsuit, the state did open advertising on bids in late October 1969. Despite the plan for bid announcements on November 26, within a week of the advertising, NJDOT was in court again, this time of a property on Central Avenue in Point Pleasant owned by William Hall. The borough of Point Pleasant was also named as a defendant as they claimed to have a lien on the property Hall owned. The borough of Bay Head noted that they would only lose one property for construction and that their municipality would not be disrupted during construction of the new bridge. However, the project would take over four parcels in total for the new bridge and approaches in Bay Head.

==== Construction (1969–1972) ====
On November 27, 1969, the state announced that they received the lowest bid of $3,344,933.85 (1969 USD) for construction of the new bridge from a joint venture of Mason–Connor, Incorporated of Pennsauken and Thomas Construction of Albany, New York. The new bridge would be 287 feet (87 m) long and 62 feet (19 m) wide, with new approaches. Bridge Avenue on both sides would be turned into dead ends while the new Bridge Avenue alignment would fork off of Hollywood Avenue in Point Pleasant and Bay Avenue in Bay Head. The two supporting piers of the bridge would be 80 feet (24 m) apart from each other. Other bids ranged from $3,386,522–$4,318,141. At that time, NJDOT noted it was studying the low bid and a deal could be made in two weeks.

Point Pleasant announced in December 1969 that they would vacate parts of Central Avenue so construction could begin on the new Lovelandtown Bridge. New road would wipe out parts of Central Avenue due to the new alignment. Point Pleasant also asked in January 1970, that the state widen Bridge Avenue at the southern side instead of the northern side of the roadway so that a costly sewer relocation would not be required.

On January 8, 1970, the state announced that they awarded the contract to Mason–Connor and Thompson Construction for the new bridge. The new bridge would have a deadline of December 15, 1971, to be finished, all to the delight of Beecroft, who began the push for the new bridge a decade prior. Residents of both communities visited a display to see the new renderings of the bridge on January 16 at the Point Pleasant Municipal Building. There it was announced that construction would begin on January 26, 1970. By January 29, demolition work begun on the old marine police headquarters as part of property clearing. However, due to the construction, the work was being done at the station in Monmouth Beach. Fearing lack of police patrol, an officer would be stationed on a boat near the old headquarters to help in the cause. They would end up moving to a new facility on Route 35 in April 1971.

William Hall, who the state had sued earlier to acquire some of his property, noted in March 1970, that the contractors were burning fires at the Lovelandtown Bridge construction site and that the smoke from the fires was polluting the air and his property. Hall noted that the fires were being started by burning old rubber tires and the Point Pleasant Borough Attorney noted that it was a violation of code to do so. Beecroft stepped in and asked the contractor to stop, despite the fact that he saw no burning going on at the property and got assurances that it would stop.

Along with the burning of tires, Beecroft also asked NJDOT in March 1970, to ask the contractor to stop routing their dump trucks over the Route 88 bridge in Point Pleasant. A police officer noted the bridge was being used by dump trucks for the contractor weighing as much as 40 tons. The weight would cause the draw leaves of the Route 88 bridge to shift as much as 12 inches (0.30 m), a dangerous amount of jump for the structure. The main concern of the dirt-loaded dump trucks was more of the safety of schoolchildren crossing the bridge at the same time as the dump trucks. If the bridge opened like that and a child got stuck in the leaves, it would mean immediate amputation. The state asked the trucks to slow down on the bridge to reduce the jump in the bridge, but that was still not enough for Beecroft who was ready to make sure they were flagged down Route 35 to reach the bridge instead. However, by the next week, the bridge was still being used by the dump trucks and any thought of the reroute would require changes to the contract in terms of cost.

By late May, the construction on the pilings for the new bridge piers had begun, with the steel bases constructed. However, work was slowed when the cases for the pilings began to have problems without specially designed seals to keep them in place. The state and the contractor could not come to terms and instead, extra costs would be added anyway under "time and materials". The extra seals would add $50,000–$100,000 to the total cost of the project as contracted. The contractor was confident it would be finished near schedule, but no guarantee of on time. Construction did resume in mid-August.

In November, there were complaints by Bay Head residents about the Bridge and Bay Avenue intersection being ripped up and left unpaved due to construction. While NJDOT said new curbs would be installed soon, no paving of the roads could start until the spring of 1971. They noted they would likely do it in April.

By March 1971, the concrete piers for the new bridge were finished and the supports for the deck of the road spans were being installed. The contractor noted that the work was 50 percent complete at that point. Most importantly, the project was still slated to be complete by December 1971. By May, the state closed parts of Bridge Avenue in Point Pleasant to detour traffic off a two-block section. This was needed to help construct the new western approach to the Lovelandtown Bridge and was to remain in place through the end of construction. However, this detour led to complaints from Point Pleasant about the strain it put on Route 88 in pre-summer traffic. The borough demanded that NJDOT adjust things to help lighten the load.

Construction of the first half of the elevator structure for the bridge began by June 1971, with one side finished by the end of the month. Preparations for the other side of the bridge structure were also taking place. The full structure was up by July 15, with construction of the road deck beginning with the bridge in the elevated position.

In October, the borough of Point Pleasant asked for the work to be amended that sidewalks would be built on the new bridge. The new bridge was not designed to have one, just four lanes of traffic. However, the project was now due to be finished in February 1972.

==== Opening and bridge failure (1972–1973) ====
On January 20, 1972, NJDOT announced that the new bridge would open within two weeks (circa February 5) if everything stayed on schedule. However, just four days later, they announced a new delay to the Spring of 1972 due to an issue with the electronic controls for the new bridge. They also said the spokesman from four days prior was incorrect in his announcement about a February 1972 opening. In late March, NJDOT announced they would soon begin testing on the new elevated structure for barge movement. The main control panel had been set in, but some parts had yet to be delivered. Testing continued through April, and NJDOT expected the bridge to open later that month.

On May 10, the state announced that the new bridge would open to traffic after a ceremony on May 23 at 11:00 am. Numerous dignitaries attended the ceremony, including Mayor Valenti of Point Pleasant and Assemblyman Franklin Berry Jr. (R-Ocean). The ceremony commemorated the 12 years of effort to help build a new bridge over the canal. At the same time, local officials used the ceremony to push help for Route 88, which also needed a new span.

As part of the original contract with Mason–Connor and Thompson Construction, the old span would be demolished. However, in mid-June, the state announced the old bridge would be used by motorists once again. The new span needed its opening mechanisms adjusted, resulting in a several week closure of the new span. These adjustments were completed by the end of July. The bridge closed again on August 31, 1972, with the mechanisms requiring more adjustments; detours were conducted through the old bridge. By September 12, it was announced the new span would continue to be closed until the problem of why the bridges was not closing properly was figured out and fixed, resulting in at least another two weeks of delay.

On October 16, 1972, it was announced that NJDOT engineers would have to submit plans by October 25 to fix the broken lift structure. By this point, there was no certain day on when the new bridge would reopen. Engineers announced on October 27 that the bridge was likely failing to close because of lack of weight on the structure. Their proposals were to add weight to the structure to help it close properly. They were not sure how long this project improvement would take, requiring continued use of the old bridge. These problems were finally corrected in December 1972, and the bridge finally reopened to traffic on December 14 at 3:00 pm.

The old Lovelandtown bridge was swung open and process began on demolishing the old structure in January 1973. As demolition continued on the bridge, the United States Coast Guard put out buoys noting the locations of the old pilings for the bridge, located 45 feet (14 m) apart from each other just under the surface. The work continued into May on removing the piles from the site of the piers, which had been blasted apart in the demolition process.

=== Modernization ===
The Lovelandtown Bridge and its approaches underwent a rehabilitation in October 2004. The lift mechanism was replaced to allow for quicker and more efficient raising and lowering of the bridge deck. The construction was completed by Carr & Duff Inc., which had received the project in June of that year. NJDOT and Governor James E. McGreevey forwarded $2.4 million (2005 USD) to the company for construction, which was completed by mid-2005. The project was part of the governor's "Fix-it First" initiative, which prioritized repairing existing roadway capacity throughout the state over building new capacity.

== Major intersections ==
The entire route is in Ocean County.

Location	mi	km	Destinations	Notes
Point Pleasant	0.00	0.00	CR 632 west (Bridge Avenue)	Western terminus
Bay Head	0.56	0.90	CR 632 east (Bridge Avenue)	Eastern terminus
1.000 mi = 1.609 km; 1.000 km = 0.621 mi
