= New Jersey Route 14 =

Proposed state highway in New Jersey, US

Route 14
- The area of the western terminus for Route 14 in the area of Butler as viewed by OpenStreetMap

Route information
- Maintained by NJDOT
- Length: 25 mi (40 km)
- Existed: 1969–1970s (never built)

Major junctions
- West end: Route 23 in Butler
- East end: Cross County Parkway at the New York state line in Alpine

Location
- Country: United States
- State: New Jersey
- Counties: Morris, Passaic, Bergen

Highway system
- New Jersey State Highway Routes; Interstate; US; State; Scenic Byways
← Route 13	→ Route 15

Route 14 was a proposed state highway through Morris, Passaic and Bergen Counties in the late 1960s and early 1970s. The plans called for a freeway extending from Route 23 in Butler, across the state to Bergen County, where it would cross over a new Hudson River crossing near Alpine. From there, the highway continue as an extension of the Cross County Parkway in Yonkers, New York. The proposal was submitted to the Federal Highway Administration for possible interstate status in 1970, but opposition from Bergen and Westchester County residents along with the engineering difficulties involved with building the proposed Hudson River bridge atop the New Jersey Palisades prevented the freeway from being built.

== Route description ==
Route 14 was to begin at New Jersey Route 23 (which was to be converted to a freeway) and Kiel Avenue in the community of Butler in Morris County. The route was to head eastward from Butler, following a four-lane freeway for 2.5 miles (4.0 km) to an interchange with Interstate 287 at Milepost 54 in Bloomingdale. The route was to be concurrent with Interstate 287 through the northern portions of Morris County and entering Passaic County towards Interchange 59, where it would follow current-day New Jersey Route 208 through Franklin Lakes in Bergen County. Route 14 was to continue for the next two miles on current-day Route 208 before forking to the northeast. From there, the highway would continue eastward through Wyckoff, Ridgewood, Oradell, New Milford, Cresskill, and into Alpine, where it would reach the Hudson River and continue in New York as the Cross County Parkway.

== History ==
While Interstate 80 was being constructed during the 1960s, the New Jersey State Highway Department started conceiving plans to construct another east–west link across New Jersey. In 1969, the now-Department of Transportation brought forth plans for a new 25-mile-long (40 km) freeway from New Jersey Route 23 and Interstate 287 near Butler, heading eastward through Morris, Passaic and Bergen Counties to a new bridge crossing over the Hudson River at Alpine. Although the freeway was a brand new proposal, this was not the first time a freeway through northern Bergen County has been conceived. The Tri-State Transportation Commission also proposed extending New Jersey Route 19 from Paterson to Alpine, where a bridge would be constructed. The bridge would relieve the rising amount of traffic on the nearby Tappan Zee and George Washington Bridges. On the Westchester side of the river, the Cross County Parkway was to be built and extended two miles to the bridge approach for opening to commercial traffic. Rumors indicated that Route 14 would possibly be extended westward from Butler to the vicinity of a proposed national recreation area along the Delaware River that would have been built in conjunction with the controversial Tocks Island Dam project. Also in the meantime, Butler officials along with their mayor, opposed widening of Route 23 through the community. In 1970, the states of New York and New Jersey began to pursue getting the portion of Route 14 and the Cross County from Franklin Lakes to Yonkers for interstate status, but financial issues, public opposition in Bergen and Westchester Counties along with design problems helped kill the freeway.

== Exit list ==
County	Location	mi	km	Exit	Destinations	Notes
Morris	Butler	0	0.0		Route 23	Proposed western terminus
Passaic	Bloomingdale				I-287 south	Milepost 54 on I-287; Beginning of proposed concurrency
Bergen	Franklin Lakes				I-287 north	Interchange 59 on I-287; End of proposed concurrency
Bergen	Alpine	25	40		Cross County Parkway east	Proposed eastern terminus; Proposed bridge over the Hudson River
1.000 mi = 1.609 km; 1.000 km = 0.621 mi: Concurrency terminus

== See also ==
- New Jersey Route 11
- New Jersey Route 60
