= Manasquan Inlet =

Inlet that connects the Atlantic Ocean with the Manasquan River

- Aerial view of the inlet

- Location in New Jersey Manasquan Inlet (the United States)
- Location: Manasquan, Monmouth County / Point Pleasant Beach, Ocean County, New Jersey, United States
- Coordinates: 40°06′10″N 74°02′06″W
- Type: Tidal inlet
- Part of: Atlantic Ocean – Manasquan River (northern terminus of the New Jersey Intracoastal Waterway)
- Primary inflows: Manasquan River
- Primary outflows: Atlantic Ocean
- Basin countries: United States
- Max. length: 1.5 mi (2.4 km)
- Max. width: 250 ft (76 m) at ocean entrance (north jetty)
- Average depth: 14 ft (4.3 m) controlling depth in navigable channel
- Max. depth: 30 ft (9.1 m) at jetties

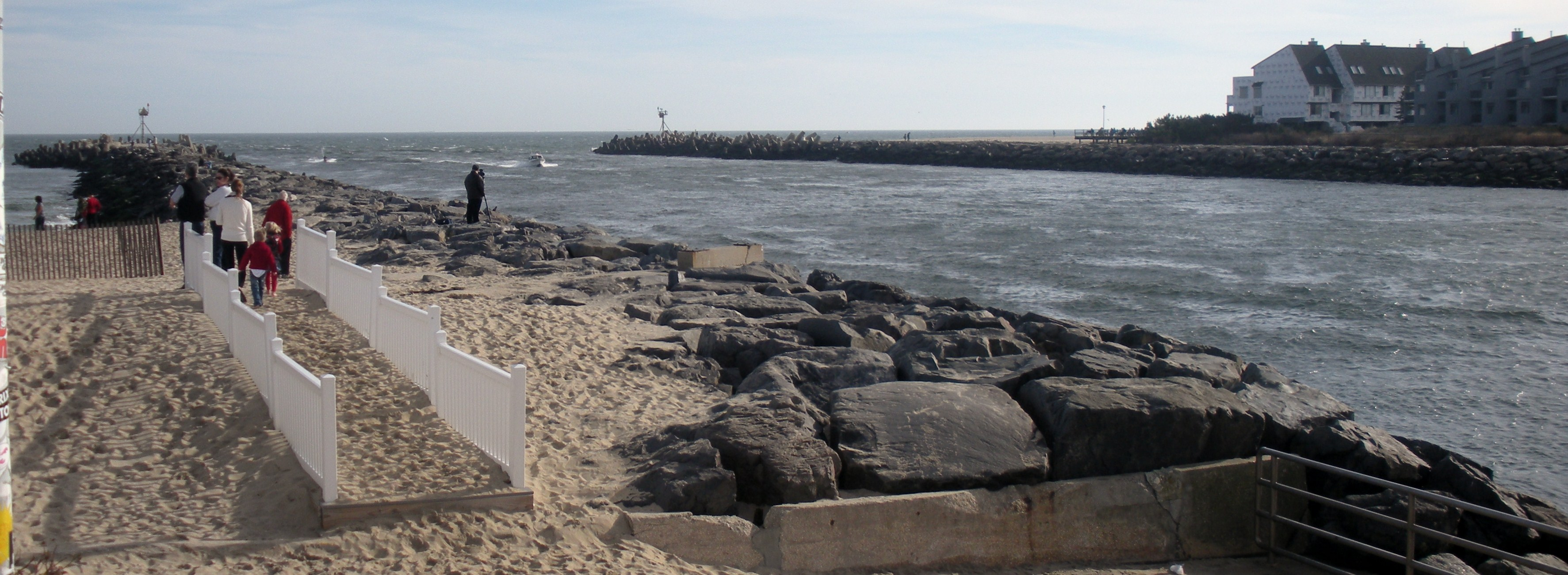
Daylight view east towards Point Pleasant Beach and the Atlantic Ocean from the Manasquan side

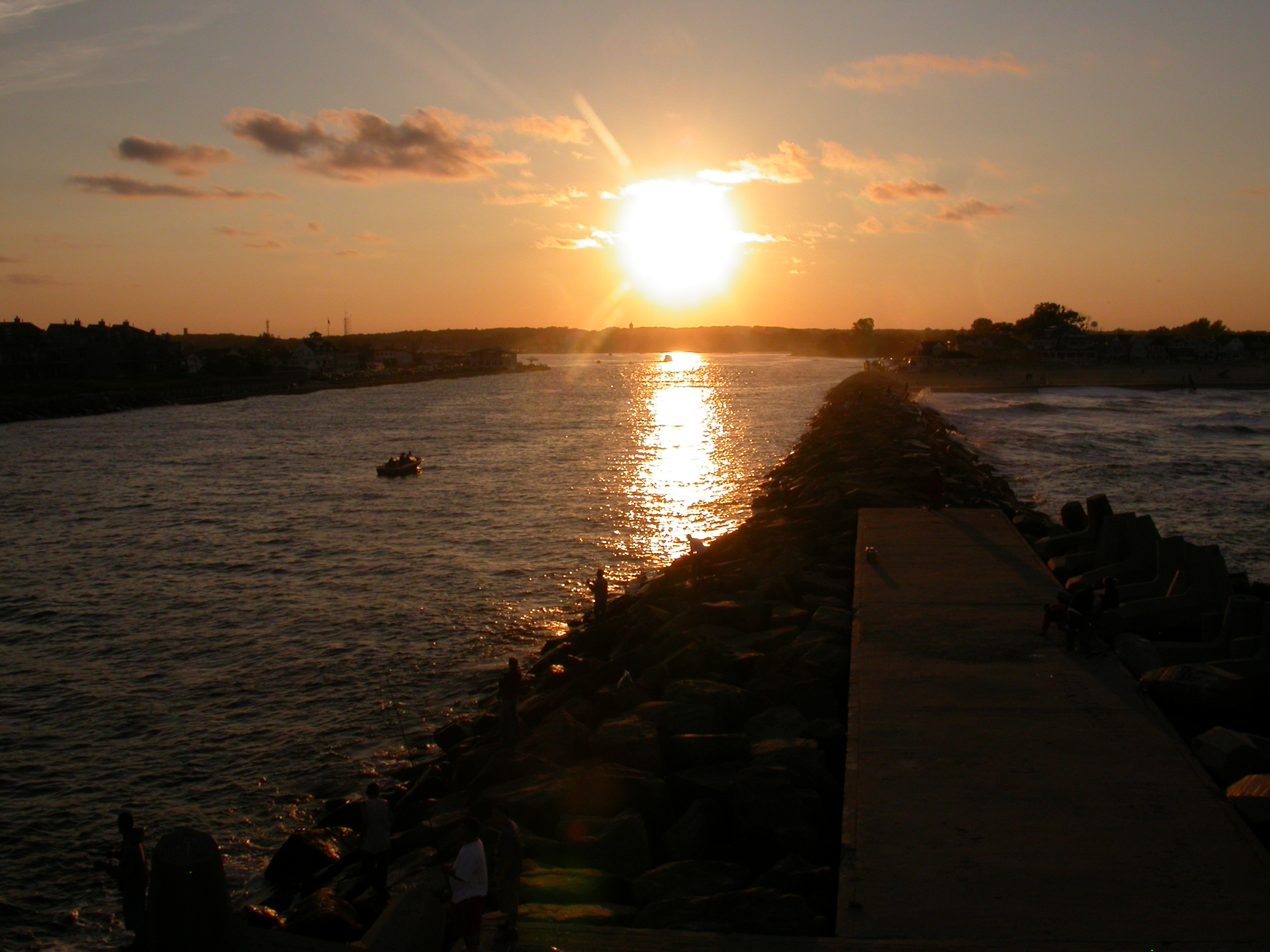
The Manasquan Inlet, looking west at sunset from the jetty on the Manasquan side

The Manasquan Inlet is an inlet that connects the Atlantic Ocean with the Manasquan River, dividing Monmouth and Ocean counties in the state of New Jersey. Passage to Bay Head Harbor and the Barnegat Bay is possible via the Point Pleasant Canal.

The present Manasquan River Inlet was dug in the 1920s with the original inlet located at Stockton Lake. The present day inlet is the northern terminus of the New Jersey Intracoastal Waterway.

The inlet is home to the Squan US Coast Guard station.

== History ==
On Sunday April 5, 1778 a contingent of about 135 British troops and loyalists entered the inlet to sack and destroy the Union salt works. The raiders burnt the salt works, broke the kettles and ransacked the surrounding homes before retreating and heading north to raid salt works in the Shark River. The Union salt works were repaired and again attacked on the night of April 21, 1780 by a detachment of provincial troops, under the command of Lieut. Col. Laurence who had sailed south from Sandy Hook.

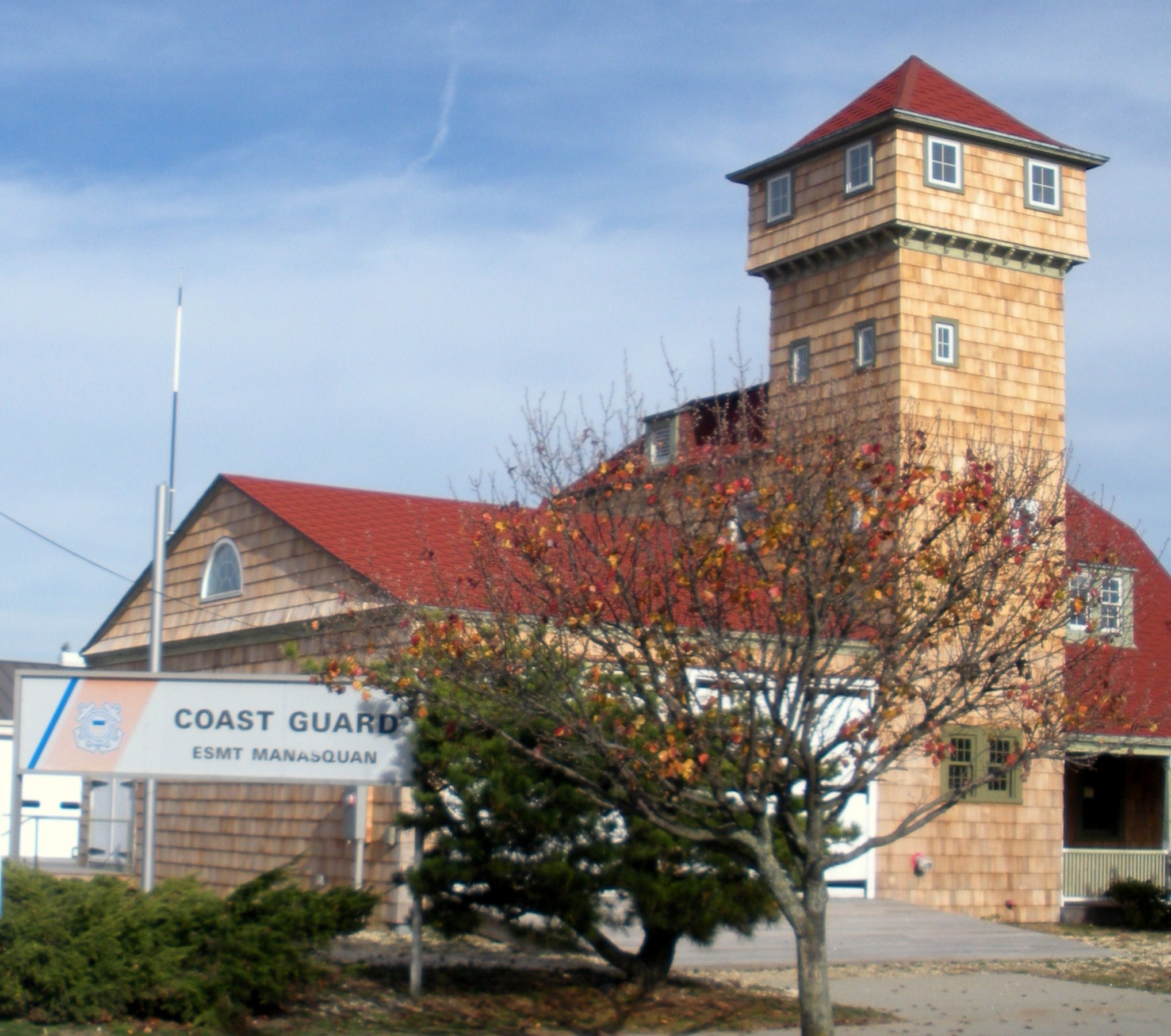
The restored Squan lifesaving station at Ocean & 2nd avenues

The present day location of the inlet is several thousand yards south of its location in 1868, the inlet had been near the former Manasquan Coast Guard Station which was adjacent to Stockton lake. The Manasquan inlet historically had always been shallow, which made it difficult for large boats to navigate. When the Point Pleasant Canal was dug in 1926, the Manasquan river's water rapidly flowed through the man-made opening disrupting the natural flow of the river, and this caused the inlet to completely close with sand for several years. The inlet's closure was so complete that it was possible to walk from Manasquan to Point Pleasant beach on dry ground. From 1926 to 1931 several efforts were made to reopen the inlet, including the use of high pressure water by the National Guard and local firemen to erode a narrow channel through the sand. These efforts failed to keep the channel open and the inlet remained closed. In 1930 work began to reopen the inlet. The Army Corps of Engineers put up temporary piers and began building jetties. The jetties were constructed with rock excavation from the Second Avenue Subway in Manhattan. The project cost $600,000 with funds from local, state and federal government. The inlet was officially reopened on August 29, 1931, with a parade of boats and was attended by New Jersey Governor Morgan F. Larson.

== Surfing ==
The Manasquan Inlet is widely known as one of the best surf spots along the East Coast. Its popularity among beach breaks throughout the East Coast stems from the inlet, which directs and often enlarges the waves as they come in to create a great right break. Many competitions are held at the Manasquan Inlet throughout the year. One of the most popular is the Manasquan Classic Longboard Contest which is held in September of every year. In 2011, the competition celebrated its 19th annual competition with a paddle out on September 11, commemorating the attacks on the World Trade Center a decade ago. Hurricane Bill, whose swell hit the shores of Manasquan in August 2009, brought many big-time professional surfers to the Manasquan Inlet including Andy Irons, Pete Mendia, Sam Hammer, and Mike Gleason.
