= Little River (Horry County, South Carolina) =

River in Horry County, South Carolina, United States of America

- Location of mouth

Location
- Country: United States
- State: South Carolina, North Carolina
- County: Georgetown County, South Carolina, Horry County, South Carolina, Brunswick County, North Carolina

Physical characteristics
- Mouth
  - location: Little River Inlet, Atlantic Ocean
  - coordinates: 33°50′45″N 78°32′49″W
  - elevation: 0 ft (0 m)

The Little River flows through Little River, South Carolina, briefly touching the border with North Carolina before emptying into the Atlantic Ocean at the Little River Inlet. A large portion of the river forms part of the Atlantic Intracoastal Waterway. Due to USGS weather buoy off Little River Inlet, the Little River Inlet is often referred to in weather forecasts.

== See also ==
- List of rivers in North Carolina
- List of rivers in South Carolina
- Waterways forming and crossings of the Atlantic Intracoastal Waterway
