= New Jersey Intracoastal Waterway =

Inland waterway along the coast of New Jersey, United States

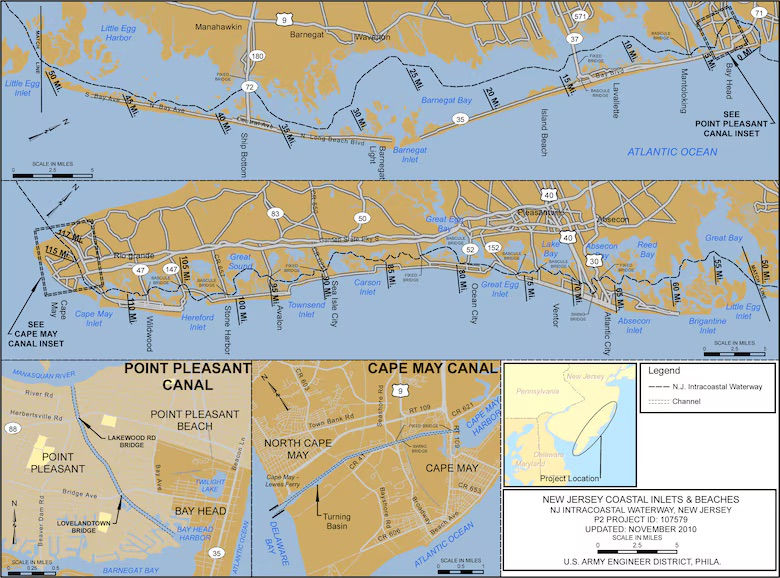
- A map of the New Jersey Intracoastal Waterway project.
- Location: New Jersey
- Country: United States

Specifications
- Length: 189 km (117 miles)
- Status: Open
- Navigation authority: U.S. Army Corps of Engineers (Philadelphia District)

History
- Date of act: 1945
- Construction began: 1908
- Date completed: 1942

Geography
- Start point: Manasquan Inlet
- End point: Delaware Bay (via Cape May Canal)
- Beginning coordinates: 40°06′10″N 74°02′06″W
- Ending coordinates: 38.9667°N 74.9648°W

The New Jersey Intracoastal Waterway (NJIWW), sometimes called the New Jersey Intracoastal Canal or NJICW, is a sea‑level inland waterway running along the Atlantic coast of New Jersey. It is part of the Atlantic Intracoastal Waterway system and provides a protected route for commercial and recreational vessels between Manasquan Inlet in the north and Delaware Bay in the south. The waterway extends about 117.7 statute miles (189 km), with most of the channel maintained to a depth of approximately 6 feet (1.8 m) at mean low water; the Cape May Canal section is maintained deeper at roughly 12 feet (3.7 m). The NJIWW serves marinas, the Cape May/Wildwood commercial fishing fleet, the U.S. Coast Guard and the Cape May–Lewes Ferry, and is popular among boaters and anglers.

Manasquan Inlet, the northern terminus of the NJIWW.

== Route ==
The NJIWW begins at Manasquan Inlet, the unofficial northern terminus of the Intracoastal Waterway, where the Manasquan River enters the Atlantic Ocean. From the inlet it follows the river for about 2 mi (3 km) and then turns south into the Point Pleasant Canal. After exiting the canal, it continues through the northern reaches of Barnegat Bay, winds past numerous inlets, islands and marshlands, and proceeds south through a succession of bays, lagoons and thoroughfares along New Jersey's barrier‑island coast (including Little Egg Harbor, Great Bay, Absecon Inlet, Great Egg Harbor Bay and Townsends Inlet). It finally enters Cape May Harbor and then, via the Cape May Canal, reaches Delaware Bay about 3 mi (5 km) north of Cape May Point. Measured southbound, mile marker 0.0 is at Manasquan Inlet and mile 117.7 is at the western entrance to the Cape May Canal; cruising guides describe the route’s length as approximately 117.7 statute miles (102.3 nautical miles).

== History ==
Between 1908 and 1916 the State of New Jersey dredged a protected channel about 6 feet (1.8 m) deep and 100 feet (30 m) wide, roughly 100 miles (160 km) long, through the bays and thoroughfares from Bay Head to Cape May Harbor. The state-built Point Pleasant Canal, linking the Manasquan River with Barnegat Bay, followed in the mid-1920s. The final link, the Cape May Canal, was dredged at federal expense in 1942 as a wartime emergency measure, with about 95 percent of the cost met from Navy Department funds. A Corps of Engineers study in 1938–39 recommended federal control of the waterway; Congress approved the transfer in 1945, and the waterway was conveyed to the United States in 1954. The Corps' current fact sheet says the project was authorized by the Rivers and Harbors Act of 1945 (as amended by the Water Resources Development Act of 1986), while a 2023 Corps presentation describes it as adopted as a federal project in 1939.

== Navigation and maintenance ==
The NJIWW is administered by the U.S. Army Corps of Engineers, Philadelphia District. Most of the waterway is maintained to a depth of about 6 ft (1.8 m) MLW, with the Cape May Canal section maintained to 12 ft (3.7 m) MLW. Shoaling is a recurring challenge, and some sections—especially between Cape May and Atlantic City—may have depths of 3.5 ft (1.1 m) or less. Maintenance dredging is funded through federal appropriations, and dredged materials are increasingly placed on eroding marshes and shorelines as part of beneficial‑use projects.

Navigation aids along the NJIWW follow the Atlantic Intracoastal Waterway marking system: markers carry yellow triangles or squares to indicate the ICW channel. When travelling south, vessels should keep yellow triangles to starboard and yellow squares to port regardless of the marker’s underlying color. Where inlet channels cross the waterway, the marker colors reverse sides. Shoaling, narrow channels and congested weekend traffic require careful attention; boaters drawing more than 3 ft (0.9 m) are advised to time their passage for rising tides, and those drawing over 3.5 ft (1.1 m) may need to use the ocean route between Cape May and Atlantic City. The controlling vertical clearance between Cape May and Atlantic City is about 35 ft (10.7 m).

== Ecology and environment ==
The dredge Fullerton working in the waterway near Stone Harbor in December 2018

The waterway traverses coastal ecosystems such as salt marshes, lagoons and barrier‑island bays. Recent Corps projects have used sediment dredged from the channel to rebuild marshland and enhance shoreline resilience at sites near Mantoloking, Mordecai Island and Seven Mile Island. In a December 2018 project near Stone Harbor, dredged material was placed to create habitat on marshland owned by the New Jersey Division of Fish & Wildlife, and The Wetlands Institute is conducting ecological monitoring of the site.

== Economic and recreational significance ==
The NJIWW supports both commercial and recreational activities. It provides access to the East Coast’s largest commercial fishing fleet at Cape May/Wildwood and to nine U.S. Coast Guard stations (including the Coast Guard Training Center). The Cape May–Lewes Ferry, operated by the Delaware River and Bay Authority, docks in the Cape May Canal; the Corps says that discontinuing the ferry service would result in vehicle detours of 183 mi (295 km). Recreational boaters use the NJIWW for cruising, fishing, birdwatching and access to shore‑town marinas.

== See also ==
- Atlantic Intracoastal Waterway
- Cape May Canal
- List of waterways forming and crossings of the Atlantic Intracoastal Waterway
- Manasquan River
- Point Pleasant Canal
