= Shallotte River =

River in Brunswick County, North Carolina, US

Coordinates: 33°54′21″N 78°22′43″W

Shallotte River Charlotte River

Location
- Country: United States
- State: North Carolina
- District: Brunswick County

Physical characteristics
- Source: Green Swamp
- Mouth: Atlantic Intracoastal Waterway
- Length: 9 m (30 ft)
- Depth
  - minimum: 3 feet
  - average: 4 feet
  - maximum: 4.6 feet

Basin features
- River system: Cape Fear
- Landmarks: Holden Beach Isle and Ocean Isle
- Waterbodies: Shallotte Inlet

The Shallotte River (pronounced shallOtte) is a tidal river in Brunswick County, North Carolina, United States.

== Geography ==
The Shallotte River is a tidal river in Brunswick County, North Carolina. Its waters drain from the tributaries of the Green Swamp near the town of Shallotte, flowing south for approximately nine miles to empty into the Atlantic Intracoastal Waterway. In addition to the Green Swamp, its river basin also includes farmland, forests, and semi-developed rural area.

Approximately one-mile southwest of the river's mouth lies the Shallotte Inlet which connects the Intracostal Waterway to Long Bay of the Atlantic Ocean. The inlet separates Holden Beach Isle from Ocean Islef; this mouth of the Shallotte River before the Intracoastal Waterway's construction and decades of shifting sands. It also runs past Sunset Beach.

The Shallotte River is heavily influenced by ocean tides, making its channel difficult to navigate. Its mouth is a wave intensive area. Waves and tides frequently move its bottom sediments which consists of course and medium sand, with traces of shell fragments. The river was dredged in 1929 for the first time, and again between 1966 and 1969. In the 1970s, the United States Army Corps of Engineers determined that 30,000 cubic yards had to be dredged every two years to maintains the river's channel. Its depth over the sandbar was 4 feet (1.2 m) 1983, making it accessible only to outboard motor boards. This made the depth at the inlet 4.6 inches and 3 feet at Shallott.

== Name origin ==
The Shallotte River name dates back to at least 1734. According to some accounts, the waterway was once known as the "Charlotte River", a name coined by a traveler who crossed it by ferry. Over time the word Charlotte morphed into Shallotte. Another explanation is the river was so named on account of there being wild shallots along its course.
