= Manasquan River =

River in the United States of America

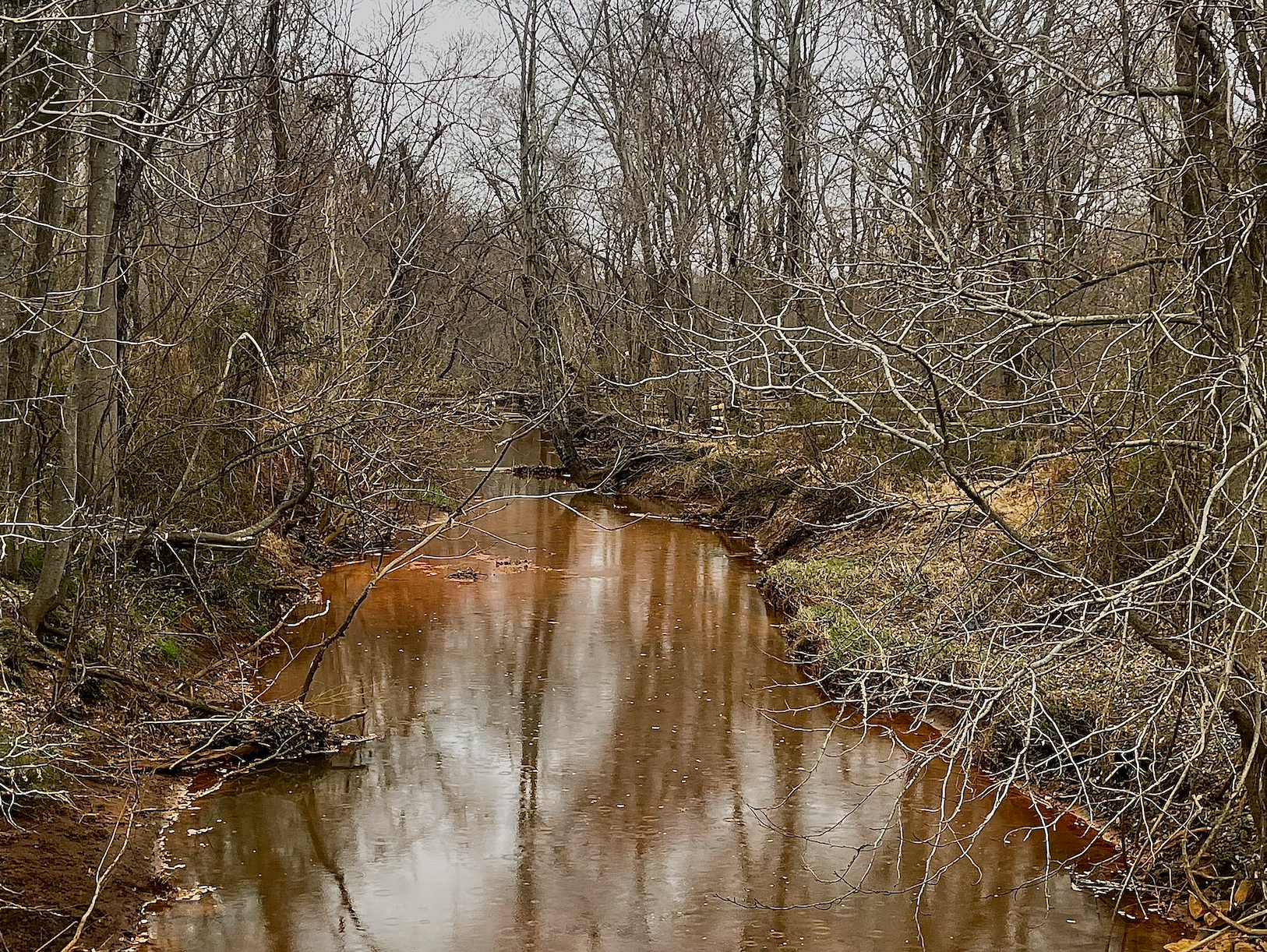
- Manasquan River as it flows through Freehold Township

Location
- Country: United States
- State: New Jersey

Physical characteristics
- Source
  - coordinates: 40.200934°N 74.341531°W
- Mouth
  - coordinates: 40.101410°N 74.032031°W
- Length: 26.5 mi (42.6 km)

The Manasquan River is a 26.5-mile-long (42.6 km) waterway in central New Jersey.

It flows from western Monmouth County, beginning in Freehold Township, near the headwaters for the Manalapan Brook and Millstone River systems in the Raritan Basin, and flowing to the Atlantic Ocean, where it empties between the communities of Manasquan and Point Pleasant via the Manasquan Inlet. It widens greatly as it nears the ocean, making it ideal for boating, and is a very popular recreational area of the Jersey Shore. The Manasquan River and Inlet is the unofficial northernmost terminus of the Intracoastal Waterway, at the start of the New Jersey Intracoastal Waterway.

The river is the center of a large watershed area that incorporates numerous streams as well as a large man-made pumped (i.e. no direct flow from the river) reservoir in Howell Township; aptly named the Manasquan Reservoir. It also marks the traditional boundary between North Jersey and South Jersey; it separates Monmouth and Ocean counties and marks the border between rich, fertile soil to the north and the sandier soil of the "Pine Barrens" to the south.

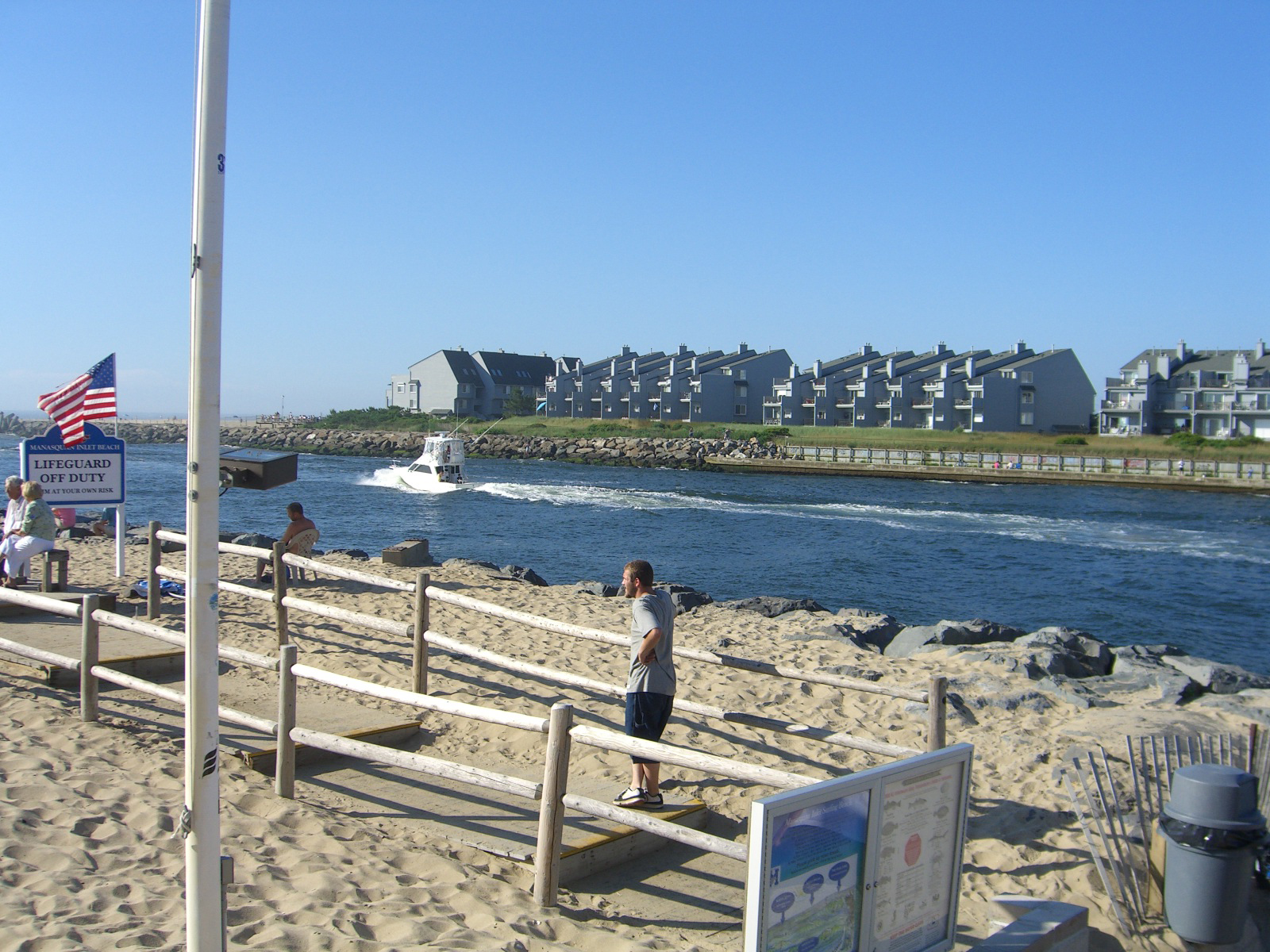
Mouth of the river

Situated in the middle of the river east of the New Jersey Route 70 highway bridge and adjacent to the former Point Pleasant Hospital site and Point Pleasant Canal entrance is a sizable island only accessible by boat that is a popular spot for picnics and recreation. The island includes a sandy beach area and even used to have an improvised swing-set for youngsters which has been removed by the boro of Brielle, but is mainly covered with trees. The water surrounding the island is deep enough to accommodate boat traffic, and boaters normally beach their boats on the sand while they enjoy a day of relaxation on the island. Today its officially named Nienstedt Island, honoring the family who donated it to the borough. In the 19th century it was known as "Osborn Island". In May 1888, Robert Louis Stevenson spent about a month in Brielle along the Manasquan River. One day Stevenson visited Osborn Island and was so impressed he whimsically renamed it "Treasure Island" after his famous novel Treasure Island (1883) and carved his initials into a bulkhead. This took place five years after he had completed the novel. To this day, many still refer to the island as such.

The navigable Manasquan River and its tributaries are crossed by three drawbridges, the Brielle Road Glimmer Glass Bridge, the Route 35 Manasquan River bridge, and the NJ Transit railroad bridge, and one fixed bridge – the Route 70 September 11 Memorial Bridge.

== See also ==
- List of New Jersey rivers
- Manasquan Inlet
