= Point Pleasant Canal =

Canal in New Jersey, United States of America

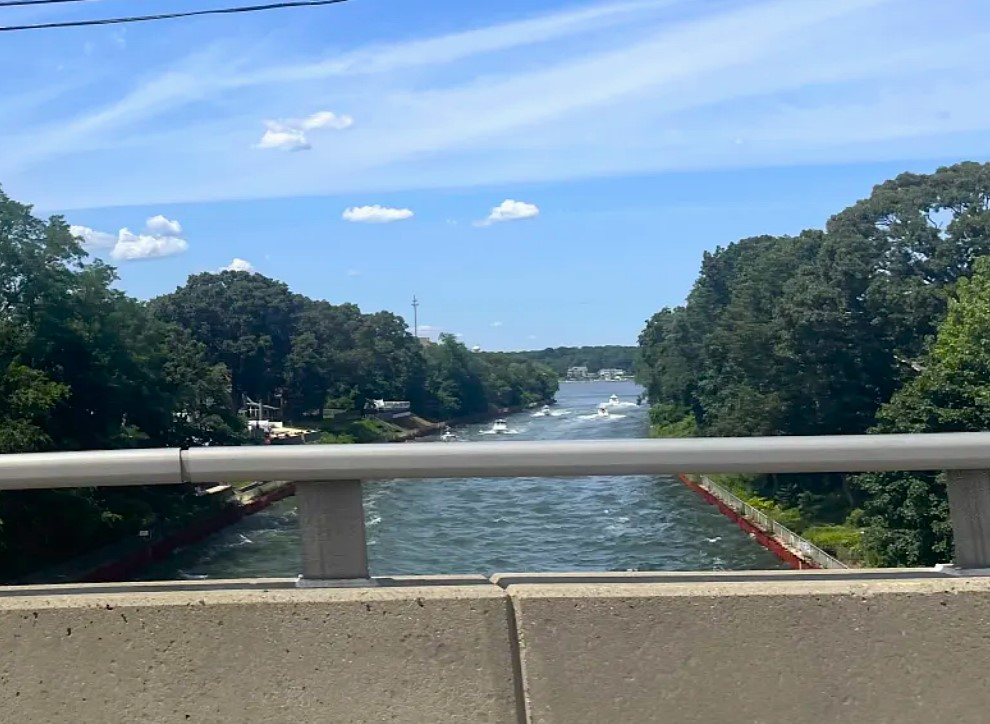
- Point Pleasant Canal seen from the Lovelandtown Bridge
- Interactive map of Point Pleasant Canal
- Location: Point Pleasant, New Jersey
- Country: United States
- Coordinates: 40.0784°N 74.0645°W

Specifications
- Length: 2 miles (3.2 km)
- Locks: None
- Status: Open

History
- Date completed: 1925

Geography
- Start point: Manasquan Inlet
- End point: Barnegat Bay

The Point Pleasant Canal is a canal in Point Pleasant, New Jersey, forming a segment of the New Jersey Intracoastal Waterway. It connects the Manasquan River and Manasquan Inlet to Barnegat Bay, providing a navigable route for vessels along the Jersey Shore.

== History ==
The canal was completed in 1925 as part of the inland waterway system, facilitating maritime navigation along the Atlantic coast. Its construction effectively bisected the Barnegat Peninsula, transforming it into an island. The canal's opening led to significant changes in local hydrology, including saltwater intrusion into upper Barnegat Bay and the closure of the original Manasquan Inlet by 1929, which adversely affected the local fishing industry. A new inlet was subsequently constructed in 1930 to restore the fishing economy.

In 1964, the canal was officially named the Point Pleasant Canal through Senate Bill #2654.

== Infrastructure ==
The canal is spanned by two lift bridges: the Route 88 Bridge and the Lovelandtown Bridge on Bridge Avenue. These bridges open on demand to allow marine traffic to pass, temporarily halting vehicular traffic.

== Environmental Monitoring ==
The U.S. Geological Survey (USGS) maintains a monitoring station at the canal (Site No. 01408043) to collect data on water quality and hydrology.

== Recent Developments ==
In January 2022, $3.2 million in federal funding was approved for repairs to the canal's bulkhead, addressing structural issues and ensuring safe navigation.
