= Little Egg Harbor =

- Map showing location of Little Egg Harbor

- Location within New Jersey
- Location: New Jersey
- Coordinates: 39.581547°N 74.26981°W
- Type: Bay

Little Egg Harbor is a brackish bay along the coast of southeast New Jersey. It was originally called Egg Harbor by the Dutch sailors because of the eggs found in nearby gull nests.

The bay is part of the New Jersey Intracoastal Waterway.

The historical spelling for the bay is "Little Egg Harbour" as found on maps provide by Rutgers University: 1706, 1775, 1777, 1784, 1795, 1826, and 1834.

== Tributaries ==
- Tuckerton Creek
- Westecunk Creek
