= Annisquam River =

River in Massachusetts

Coordinates: 42°39′18″N 70°41′8″W

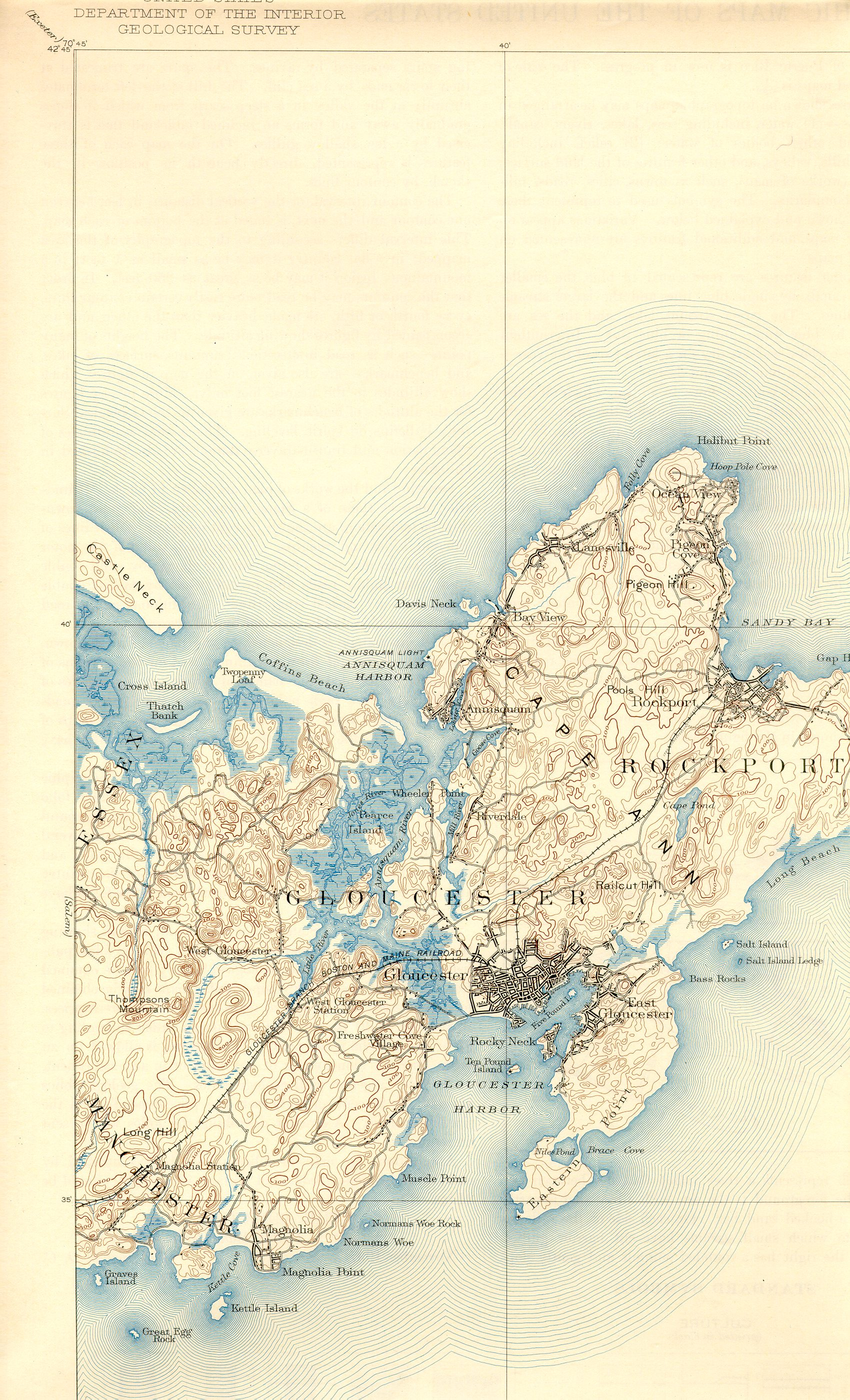
Annisquam River and environs

The Annisquam River is a tidal, salt-water estuary in the Annisquam neighborhood of Gloucester, Massachusetts, connecting Annisquam Harbor on the north to Gloucester Harbor on the south. The segment between Gloucester Harbor and the Newburyport/Rockport Line bridge is also known as the Blynman Canal.

The estuary is about 4.5 miles (7.2 km) long, navigable, and open to the ocean at both ends. Its surface area is 1.9 square miles (4.9 km^{2}). The name "Annisquam" comes from an Algonquian term meaning "top of the rock, containing <wanashque>, "on top of", and <-ompsk>, "rock". The first European settlement in Annisquam was established in 1631. The river was dredged by the United States Army Corps of Engineers in 1965 to create a channel some 8 feet (2.4 m) deep, and 60 to 200 feet (18 to 61 m) wide. Annisquam Harbor Light stands on the east, Cape Ann, side of the north entrance to the river.

There are only three fixed crossings of the river: Massachusetts Route 128, the Rockport Branch of the MBTA Newburyport/Rockport Line, and Western Avenue (Massachusetts Route 127).

There are strong tidal currents in the river, and unusually the current flows in opposite directions at the two ends.
