= Silverton, New Jersey =

Populated place in Ocean County, New Jersey, US

- Unincorporated community
- Silverton's location in Ocean County (Inset: Ocean County in New Jersey) Silverton, New Jersey (New Jersey) Silverton, New Jersey (the United States)
- Coordinates: 40°00′57″N 74°08′42″W
- Country: United States
- State: New Jersey
- County: Ocean
- Township: Toms River
- Elevation: 13 ft (4 m)
- ZIP Code: 08753
- GNIS feature ID: 0880614

Silverton is an unincorporated community located within the north-eastern portion of Toms River Township in Ocean County, in the U.S. state of New Jersey. The area comprises the area surrounding the Silver Bay and including Green Island. Several bay beach clubs service the surrounding neighborhoods as recreation centers. Silver Bay Elementary School, part of the Toms River Regional Schools, is located on Silver Bay Road.

Silverton is bordered to the north by Brick Township. Main roads that run through Silverton include Hooper Avenue (County Route 549), Silver Bay Road, and Church Road/Kettle Creek Road (County Route 620).
