= List of ship launches in 1853 =

The list of ship launches in 1853 includes a chronological list of some ships launched in 1853.

Date	Ship	Class	Builder	Location	Country	Notes
3 January	Daniel Webster	Paddle steamer	Samuel Sneden	Greenpoint, New York	United States	For Maine Steam Navigation Co.
7 January	Abyssinian	Barque	Lister & Bartram	North Hylton	United Kingdom	For John Charlton.
8 January	Golden Light	Medium clipper	E. & H. O. Briggs	South Boston, Massachusetts	United States	For James Huckins & Sons.
10 January	Golden State	Extreme clipper	Jacob Aaron Westervelt	New York	United States	For Chambers & Heiser.
10 January	Vectis	Steamship	Messrs. John & Robert White	Cowes	United Kingdom	For Peninsular and Oriental Steam Navigation Company.
11 January	Mystery	Clipper	Samuel Hall	East Boston, Massachusetts	United States	For Crocke & Sturgis and D. G. & W. B. Bacon.
11 January	Swarthmore	Merchantman	Messrs. Coutts & Parkinson	Newcastle upon Tyne	United Kingdom	For private owners.
12 January	Frigate Bird	Clipper	J. A. Robb	Baltimore, Maryland	United States	For C. H. Cummings & Co.
12 January	Guanabara	Paddle steamer	Messrs. Miller, Ravenhill & Salkeld	Newcastle upon Tyne	United Kingdom	For private owner.
13 January	Ann Holzberg	Clipper	Clarke	Saint Helier	Jersey	For Messrs. J. J. Melhuish & Co.
13 January	Highflyer	Medium clipper	Currier & Townsend	Newburyport, Massachusetts	United States	For Red Cross Packet Line.
13 January	Wild Wave	Schooner	Westacott	Barnstaple	United Kingdom	For private owner.
14 January	Empress of the Seas	Clipper	Donald McKay	East Boston, Massachusetts	United States	For William Wilson & Son.
15 January	Cairngorm	Clipper	Messrs. J. & W. Hall	Aberdeen	United Kingdom	For Messrs. Jardine, Mathieson & Co.
15 January	Resolute	Clipper	Westervelt & Sons	New York	United States	For private owner.
15 January	Tribune	Tribune-class frigate		Sheerness Dockyard	United Kingdom	For Royal Navy.
24 January	Radiant	Medium clipper	Paul Curtis	East Boston, Massachusetts	United States	For Baker & Morrill.
26 January	British Tar	Barque	Robert Thompson & Sons	Sunderland	United Kingdom	For John Dryden.
28 January	Narvaes	Steamship		Ferrol	Spain	For unknown owner.
28 January	Tiger	Tug	Messrs. Cato, Miller & Co.	Liverpool	United Kingdom	For Liverpool Steam-tug Company.
29 January	Hope	Steamship	John Laird	Birkenhead	United Kingdom	For private owner.
January	Granite City	Clipper	Messrs. Walter Hood & Co.	Aberdeen	United Kingdom	For private owner.
January	Hanover	Full-rigged ship		South Shields	United Kingdom	For Messrs. Marshall & Edridge.
January	Norman	Barque	Austin & Mills	Southwick	United Kingdom	For Langton & Co.
January	Rangoon	Barque	T. Stonerhouse	Sunderland	United Kingdom	For Mr. Buchanan.
January	Sarah Huntly	Barque	Rawson & Watson	Sunderland	United Kingdom	For Mr. Huntly.
January	Star of the East	Clipper	Messrs. W. & R. Wright	Saint Join	(United Kingdom of Great Britain and Ireland) Colony of New Brunswick	For private owner.
1 February	Ellen	Paddle steamer		New York	United States	For private owner.
4 February	Jacob A. Westervelt	Pilot boat	Daniel Westervelt	New York	United States	For New York Pilots.
5 February	Walter Duncan	Merchantman	John Smith	Sunderland	United Kingdom	For John Martin & Walter Duncan.
8 February	San Guisto	Steamship	Messrs. Thomas Vernon and Son	Liverpool	United Kingdom	For Österreichischer Lloyd.
8 February	Saxon	Schooner	Peter Austin	Sunderland	United Kingdom	For Langton & Co.
10 February	Roderick Dhu	Barque	Messrs. Denny & Rankin	Dumbarton	United Kingdom	For A. Sword and others.
12 February	Havilah	Steamship	Messrs. C. Mitchell & Co.	Low Walker	United Kingdom	For private owner.
26 February	Telegraph	Paddle steamer	J. & G. Thomson	Govan	United Kingdom	For Belfast Steamship Company.
28 February	Anne Cheshyre	Brigantine	Messrs. Brundrit and Whiteway	Runcorn	United Kingdom	For Brundrit & Whiteway.
28 February	Lancashire		Messrs. Peter Chaloner, Sons, & Co.	Liverpool	United Kingdom	For Messrs. James Browne & Co.
February	Celestial	Barque	Messrs. Turnbull & Co.	Stockton on Tees	United Kingdom	For private owner.
February	Competitor	Clipper	J. O. Curtis	Medford, Massachusetts	United States	For W. F. Weld & Co.
9 March	Aspirant	Barque	John Pile	Sunderland	United Kingdom	For S. A. Gibb.
10 March	John Lawson	Barque	Messrs. T. Turnbull & Son	whitby	United Kingdom	For John Lawson.
11 March	Amelia	Steamship	Cram	Chester	United Kingdom	For private owner.
12 March	San Marco	Steamship	John Laird	Birkenhead	United Kingdom	For Österreichischer Lloyd.
15 March	Minister Thorbecke	Steamship	Messrs. C. & W. Earle	Hull	United Kingdom	For Zwolle Shipping Company.
23 March	Bellone	Frigate		Cherbourg	France	For French Navy.
23 March	Prima Donna	Brig	John Smith	Pallion	United Kingdom	For Mr. Prew.
23 March	St Jean d'Acre	James Watt-class ship of the line		Devonport Dockyard	United Kingdom	For Royal Navy.
23 March	Sylph	Steamship	Messrs Home & Murphy	Waterford	United Kingdom	For private owner.
24 March	Euphrosyne	Full-rigged ship	Robert Thompson & Sons	Monkwearmouth	United Kingdom	For Coxon & Grace.
24 March	Kangaroo	Full-rigged ship	William Pile Jr.	Monkwearmouth	United Kingdom	For P. Tindall.
24 March	Nimrod	Full-rigged ship	Austin & Mills	Southwick	United Kingdom	For John Allan.
25 March	Belle of the West	Extreme clipper	Shiverick Brothers	East Dennis, Massachusetts	United States	For Christopher Hall.
26 March	John Land	Medium clipper	E. & H. O. Briggs	South Boston, Massachusetts	United States	For Baker & Morrill.
26 March	Mischief	Extreme clipper	James M. Hood	Somerset, Massachusetts	United States	For W. H. Merrill.
26 March	Queen of Clippers	Clipper	Robert E. Jackson	East Boston, Massachusetts	United States	For Seccomb & Taylor.
26 March	Victoria	Paddle steamer	Messrs. Scott, Russell & Co.	River Thames	United Kingdom	For Australian Screw Steam Shipping Company.
26 March	White Swallow	Clipper	Hayden & Cudworth	Medford, Massachusetts	United States	For William Lincoln & Co.
28 March	Cleopatra	Clipper	Paul Curtis	East Boston, Massachusetts	United States	For Benjamin Bangs.
28 March	Stewarts	Barque		South Shields	United Kingdom	For Robert Stewart.
28 March	Perlita	Paddle tender	Bank Quay Foundry Co.	Warrington	United Kingdom	For Pacific Steam Navigation Company.
31 March	San Carlo	Steamship	John Laird	Birkenhead	United Kingdom	For Österreichischer Lloyd.
March	Olive Branch	Brig	W. Reed	Sunderland	United Kingdom	For R. Oliver.
March	Queen Victoria	Steamship	Robert Thompson & Sons	Sunderland	United Kingdom	For Edmund Graham.
March	West Wind	Medium clipper	Joshua Foster	Medford, Massachusetts	United States	For J. & A. Tirrell.
7 April	Wild Ranger	Clipper	J. O. Curtis	Medford, Massachusetts	United States	For Searse & Thatcher.
9 April	Cormorant	Steamship	Cork Steamship Company	Cork	United Kingdom	For private owner.
9 April	Malacca	Sloop		Moulmein	Burma	For Royal Navy.
9 April	Queen of the Isles	Steamship	Messrs. Giles & Boucher	Chatham	United Kingdom	For private owner.
13 April	Wild Duck	Clipper	George Raynes	Portsmouth, New Hampshire	United States	For Olyphant & Co.
16 April	Neptune's Car	Clipper	Page & Allen	Portsmouth, Virginia	United States	For Foster & Nickerson.
23 April	Braziliera	Steamship	John Laird	Birkenhead	United Kingdom	For South American and General Steam Navigation Company.
23 April	Charity	Steamship	John Laird	Birkenhead	United Kingdom	For African Mail Steamship Company.
23 April	James Watt	Cressy-class ship of the line		Pembroke Dock	United Kingdom	For Royal Navy.
23 April	Schwarzenberg	Frigate		Venice	Austrian Empire	For Austrian Navy.
23 April	Sappho	Schooner	Camper	Gosport	United Kingdom	For G. P. Naylor.
25 April	Josefina	Steamship	Messrs. John Wood & Co	Port Glasgow	United Kingdom	For Messrs. Salomon, Moro & Leon.
25 April	Martaban	Clipper	Messrs. John Scott & Sons	Greenock	United Kingdom	For Mr. Campbell and others.
25 April	Olinda	Steamship	Messrs. John Wood & Co.	Port Glasgow	United Kingdom	For South American and General Steam Navigation Company.
25 April	Phlegethon	Corvette		Cherbourg	France	For French Navy.
25 April	Woodside	Ferry	Messrs. Jordan & Co.	Liverpool	United Kingdom	For Liverpool Harbour Commissioners.
26 April	Atrato	Paddle steamer	Caird & Company	Greenock	United Kingdom	For Royal Mail Steam Packet Company.
26 April	Hurricane	Clipper	Messrs. Stephen & Sons	Kelvinhaugh	United Kingdom	For Messrs. Potter, Wilson & Co.
27 April	Caprice	Cutter yacht	Ratsey	Cowes	United Kingdom	For H. Baring.
27 April	Susan Bayley	Brig	William Bayley	Ipswich	United Kingdom	For private owner.
28 April	Vesta	Steamship	Smith & Rodger	Govan	United Kingdom	For Malcolmson Bros.
30 April	North Wind	Extreme clipper	Abraham C. Bell	New York	United States	For Grinnell, Minturn & Co.
30 April	Young America	Extreme clipper	William H. Webb	New York	United States	For George B. Daniels.
April	Chariot of Fame	Medium clipper	Donald McKay	East Boston, Massachusetts	United States	For Enoch Train & Co.
April	Flamingo	Paddle steamer		River Clyde	United Kingdom	For private owner.
April	Martha Miles	Merchantman	William Henry Pearson	Panns	United Kingdom	For William Henry Pearson.
April	Newa	Steamship		River Clyde	United Kingdom	For private owner.
April	Spirit of the North	Clipper	John Pile	Sunderland	United Kingdom	For T. A. Gibb & John Pender.
6 May	Water Witch	Clipper	Fernald & Pettigrew	Portsmouth, New Hampshire	United States	For Stephen Tilton and others.
9 May	Imperatritsa Maria	Khrabryi-class ship of the line	I. S. Dimitriev	Sevastopol	Russia	For Imperial Russian Navy.
9 May	Margaret	Cutter yacht		Colchester	United Kingdom	For Mr. Mann.
10 May	Ærolite	Clipper	Webster	Fraserburgh	United Kingdom	For Messrs. John Wemyss & Co.
10 May	Name unknown	Barque	Bradley Potts & Co	Pallion Flats	United Kingdom	For Berwick & Co.
11 May	Gauntlet	Yacht	Messrs. Denny & Rankin	Dumbarton	United Kingdom	For private owner.
12 May	Bibb	Cutter		Charleston Navy Yard	United States	For United States Coast Survey.
12 May	Bonita	Medium clipper	E. & H. O. Briggs	South Boston, Massachusetts	United States	For James Huckins.
19 May	Cobra	Steamboat	Cram	Chester	United Kingdom	For Mr. Walters.
21 May	Argentine	Paddle steamer	John Laird	Birkenhead	United Kingdom	For South American and General Steam Navigation Company.
23 May	Carlo Alberto	Frigate	Messrs. T. & W. Smith	Newcastle upon Tyne	United Kingdom	For Royal Sardinian Navy.
24 May	Golden Queen	Steamship	Cram	Chester	United Kingdom	For New South Wales and Intercolonial Steam Navigation Company.
24 May	Himalaya	Paddle steamer	C. J. Mare & Co.	Leamouth	United Kingdom	For Peninsular and Oriental Steam Navigation Company.
24 May	Rubens	Clipper	Messrs. Alexander Duthie & Co.	Aberdeen	United Kingdom	For Andrew Anderson.
25 May	Lucifer	Corvette		Rochefort	France	For French Navy.
25 May	Water Lily	Yacht		Birkenhead	United Kingdom	For Messrs. Phillips & Weare.
26 May	Burlington	Full-rigged ship	J. & R. Mills	Southwick	United Kingdom	For J. Lidgett, or Messrs. Ledgett & Son.
May	Annie Jane	Clipper		Quebec	(United Kingdom of Great Britain and Ireland) Province of Canada	For private owner.
May	Julia	Schooner	Ratsey	Cowes	United Kingdom	For W. Peareth.
6 June	Lancashire Witch	Schooner	J. B. Mansfield	Teignmouth	United Kingdom	For L. V. Palk.
7 June	Queen of Sheba	Barque	Mrs. M. J. Stokeld	Blyth, Northumberland	United Kingdom	For Messrs. John Patterson.
7 June	Vulcan	Steamship	Messrs. C. Mitchell & Co.	Low Walker	United Kingdom	For private owne.
8 June	Crawfords	Barque	Messrs. Bowman & Drummond	Blyth	United Kingdom	For W. R. Crawford.
8 June	Solent	Steamship	Messrs. John & Robert White	Cowes	United Kingdom	For Royal West India Mail Steamship Company.
11 June	Caledonia	Steamship	Teas & Birely	Philadelphia, Pennsylvania	United States	For private owner.
11 June	Manx Fairy	Steamship	John Laird	Birkenhead	United Kingdom	For Ramsey (Isle of Man) Steam Packet Company.
15 June	Whistler	Clipper	George W. Jackman, Jr.	Newburyport, Massachusetts	United States	For Bush & Wildes.
18 June	Keystone State	Paddle steamer	Vaughn & Lynn	Philadelphia, Pennsylvania	United States	For Philadelphia and Savannah Steam Navigation Company.
20 June	Skimmer of the Seas	Barque	William Pile Jr.	Sunderland	United Kingdom	For Thomas Thompson.
21 June	Crœsus	Steamship	Messrs. C. J. Mare & Sons	Blackwall	United Kingdom	For General Screw Steam Shipping Company.
21 June	Mimosa	Clipper	Alexander Hall and Sons	Aberdeen	United Kingdom	For Daniel Green, William Killey and Robert Vining.
21 June	Pallion	Barque	John Watson	Sunderland	United Kingdom	For Edward Mounsey.
21 June	Rover	Helena-class sloop-of-war		Pembroke Dockyard	United Kingdom	For Royal Navy.
21 June	Sweepstakes	Extreme clipper	Daniel and Aaron Westervelt	New York	United States	For private owner.
21 June	Titania	Schooner	John Scott Russell	Glasgow	United Kingdom	For Robert Stephenson.
21 June	Uncle Tom	Barque	John Smith	Pallion	United Kingdom	For private owner.
22 June	Berdinkha	Snow	J. & J. Robinson	Sunderland	United Kingdom	For Messrs. Marwood.
23 June	Princess Royal	Second rate		Portsmouth Dockyard	United Kingdom	For Royal Navy.
23 June	Unnamed	Merchantman	Messrs. Gaddy & Lamb	Newcastle upon Tyne	United Kingdom	For Messrs. Woods, Spence & Co.
25 June	Douro	Steamship	Messrs. Tod & Macgregor	Partick	United Kingdom	For private owner.
25 June	Lady of the Test	Yacht	M. Ratsey & Sons	West Cowes	United Kingdom	For J. Woods.
25 June	Northfleet	Full-rigged ship		Northfleet	United Kingdom	For Messrs. Dent.
25 June	The Batanza	Steamship	Messrs. Pattersons	Wapping	United Kingdom	For private owner.
25 June	Zara	Schooner	J. White	East Cowes	United Kingdom	For Earl of Wilton.
30 June	Elk	Paddle steamer	Messrs Denny Brothers	Dumbarton	United Kingdom	For private owner.
30 June	Matchless	Clipper	Isaac Taylor	Chelsea, Massachusetts	United States	For Nathaniel and Benjamin Goddard.
June	Amphitrite	Clipper	Samuel Hale	Boston, Massachusetts	United States	For private owner.
June	Elizabeth & Emily	Barque	Peter Gibson	Sunderland	United Kingdom	For Briggs & Co.
June	Flying Dragon	Clipper	Trufant & Drummond	Bath, Maine	United States	For Reed, Wade & Co.
June	Irene	Barque	J. Watson	Sunderland	United Kingdom	For private owner.
June	Queen Margaret	Barque	W. Naisby	Sunderland	United Kingdom	For "Mesn'rd".
June	Soho	Schooner	John Duncan	Speymouth	United Kingdom	For Peter Murray.
June	Wave	Barque		Hartlepool	United Kingdom	For private owner.
June	Unnamed	Barque	Havelock & Robson	Sunderland	United Kingdom	For Mr. Nicholson.
June	Unnamed	Barque	Sykes	Sunderland	United Kingdom	For Messrs. Douglas.
6 July	William the Conqueror	Barque	Messrs. Thomas Young & Sons	South Shields	United Kingdom	For Messrs. T. Young & Co.
7 July	Lady Agnes Duff	Barque	Messrs. Calman & Martin	Dundee	United Kingdom	For private owners.
7 July	Tartar	Paddle steamer	Thomas & Robert White	Cowes	United Kingdom	For Peninsular and Oriental Steam Navigation Company.
9 July	Calhoun	Steamship		New York	United States	For private owner.
9 July	Colombo	Steamship	Robert Napier and Sons	Glasgow	United Kingdom	For Peninsular and Oriental Steam Navigation Company.
11 July	Robert McClelland	Cushing-class schooner	J. M. Hood	Somerset, Massachusetts	United States	For United States Revenue Cutter Service.
13 July	James C. Dobbin	Cushing-class schooner	J. M. Hood	Somerset, Massachusetts	United States	For United States Revenue Cutter Service.
15 July	Dashing Wave	Medium clipper	Fernalt & Pettigrew	Portsmouth, New Hampshire	United States	For Samuel Tilton & Co.
18 July	Solway	Steamship	Messrs. John Scott & Sons	Greenock	United Kingdom	For private owner.
20 July	Eagle	Steamship	Messrs. Brownlow, Pearson & Co.	Hull	United Kingdom	For private owner.
20 July	Kangaroo	Steamship			United Kingdom	For Australasian Pacific Steam Navigation Company, or Australasian Pacific Mail Steam Packet Company.
20 July	Raven	Yacht	Messrs. Miller, Ravenhill & Salkeld	Low Walker	United Kingdom	For private owner.
21 July	Caesar	Caesar-class ship of the line		Pembroke Dockyard	United Kingdom	For Royal Navy.
21 July	Cressy	Cressy-class ship of the line	Messrs. Red, Chatfield & Creuze	Chatham Dockyard	United Kingdom	For Royal Navy.
22 July	Tonning	Paddle steamer		Glasgow	United Kingdom	For North of Europe Steam Navigation Company.
23 July	Emilie	Steamship	John Laird	Birkenhead	United Kingdom	For J. Eaton.
23 July	Preston	Steamship	T. D. Marshall	South Shields	United Kingdom	For W. Threlfall.
25 July	George and Lucy	Barque	Messrs. George & Henry Wildsmith	Worsborough	United Kingdom	For Robert Earl.
28 July	Fearless	Clipper	A. & G. T. Sampson	East Boston, Massachusetts	United States	For William F. Weld & Co.
30 July	Anne Walker	Schooner	Samuel Mason	Runcorn	United Kingdom	For John Davies.
July	Chanticleer	Steamship		Dumbarton	United Kingdom	For John Ormston.
July	Hurkaru	Clipper		Newcastle upon Tyne	United Kingdom	For private owner.
3 August	Anne	Barque	George Short	Sunderland	United Kingdom	For Mr. Eltringham.
4 August	Beberebe	Steamship	Messrs. Green	Blackwall	United Kingdom	For Imperial Brazilian Navy.
4 August	Skylark	Extreme clipper	James M. Hood	Somerset, Massachusetts	United States	For Crocker & Warren.
5 August	De Ruyter	Frigate	Rijkswerf Vlissingen	Vlissingen	Netherlands	For Royal Netherlands Navy.
6 August	Jason	Steamship	Messrs. Mare	Blackwall	United Kingdom	For General Screw Steam Shipping Company.
6 August	Lord Collingwood	Barque	George Robinson	Blyth	United Kingdom	For Peter Dale.
6 August	Marion	Barque	Messrs. Hall	Aberdeen	United Kingdom	For Messrs. Shand.
6 August	Peninsula	Steamship	Messrs. William Joyce & Co.	Greenwich	United Kingdom	For Spanish and Portuguese Screw Steam Shipping Company.
8 August	Mary	Schooner	Messrs. Denny & Rankin	Dumbarton	United Kingdom	For private owner.
9 August	Lusitania	Steamship	John Laird	Birkenhead	United Kingdom	For South American and General Steam Navigation Company.
14 August	Kathay	Extreme clipper	Jacob A. Westervelt	New York	United States	For Goodhue & Co.
15 August	Morning Light	Extreme clipper	William Cramp & Sons	Kensington, Pennsylvania	United States	For Bucknor & McGammon.
15 August	Ocean Pearl	Medium clipper	J. Magoun	Charlestown, Massachusetts	United States	For Alpheus Hardy.
17 August	Rose Ellis	Barque	James Hardie	Southwick	United Kingdom	For Henry Ellis.
18 August	Belle of Oregon City	Paddle steamer	William H. Troop	Linn City	(United States) Oregon Territory	For William B. Wells and Richard Williams.
18 August	Cyclone	Medium clipper	E. & H. O. Briggs	South Boston, Massachusetts	United States	For Curtis & Peabody.
18 August	Kingfisher	Extreme clipper	Hayden & Cudworth	Medford, Massachusetts	United States	For William Lincoln & Co.
18 August	Pampero	Extreme clipper	Charles Mallory	Mystic, Connecticut	United States	For J. Bishop & Co.
18 August	Queen of the South	Brig	L. B. Bushel	South Shields	United Kingdom	For Mr. Hunter.
20 August	Estrella	Paddle steamer	Samuda Brothers	Blackwall	United Kingdom	For Magdalena Steam Navigation Company.
20 August	London	Paddle steamer	Messrs. Hoby & Co.	Renfrew	United Kingdom	For private owner.
22 August	Emeu	Steamship			United Kingdom	For Australasian Pacific Steam Packet Company.
23 August	New E. D.	Snow	John Smith	Pallion	United Kingdom	For J. Oldrey, or Messrs. Oldrey & Co.
25 August	Morning Light	Extreme clipper	Tobey & Littlefield	Portsmouth, New Hampshire	United States	For Glidden & Williams.
25 august	San Francisco	Extreme clipper	Abraham C. Bell	New York	United States	For Rich & Elam and Thomas Wardle.
August	Belisarna	Barque	Rawson, Watson & Co.	Southwick	United Kingdom	For John Norman.
August	Eugénie	Brig		Dieppe	France	For private owner.
August	Jessamine	Merchantman	William Petrie	Sunderland	United Kingdom	For Lumsdon & Co, or Messrs. E. Lumsden & Sons.
August	Mazeppa	Barque		Portland	(United Kingdom of Great Britain and Ireland) Colony of New Brunswick	For private owner.
August	Northern Lights	Barque	James Young	South Shields	United Kingdom	For James Young.
August	Sorrento	Steamship	Messrs. Coutts & Parkinson	Newcastle upon Tyne	United Kingdom	For Metropolitan and Sicilian Steam Company.
August	Vesta	Paddle steamer	John Barr	Glasgow	United Kingdom	For Glasgow, Largs & Millport Union Steam Boat Co.
3 September	Evangeline	Barque	Bartram & Lister and John & Robert Candlish	Southwick	United Kingdom	For J. Douglas.
3 September	Reporter	Medium clipper	Paul Curtis	East Boston, Massachusetts	United States	For David Snow and others.
3 September	Spitfire	Extreme clipper	James Arey & Sons	Frankfort, Maine	United States	For Thomas Gray and Manning & Stanwood.
5 September	Electric	Clipper	Irons & Grinnell	Mystic, Connecticut	United States	For G. Adams.
5 September	Gauntlet	Clipper	Thomas J. Southard	Richmond, Maine	United States	For Stephenson & Thurston.
16 September	Unnamed	Merchantman	Messrs. Barr & Shearer	Ardrossan	United Kingdom	For Messrs. Hardy, Moore & Co.
17 September	Aigle	Aviso		Cherbourg	France	For French Navy.
17 September	Donna Maria Segunda	Steamship	Messrs. R. & H. Green	Blackwall	United Kingdom	For Portuguese and Brazilian Steam Navigation Company.
17 September	Tornado	Merchantman	Messrs. William Simon & Co.	Partick	United Kingdom	For Messrs. Neilson & M'Intosh.
20 September	Blenheim	Barque	W. Naizby	North Hylton	United Kingdom	For A. Strong.
20 September	Mino	Steamship	Cram	Chester	United Kingdom	For private owner.
22 September	Nashville	Paddle steamer	William Collyer	Greenpoint, New York	United Kingdom	For private owner.
September	Don Quixote	Medium clipper	Samuel Lapham	Medford, Massachusetts	United States	For John Ellerton Lodge.
September	Iron King	Steamship	Potts	Newcastle upon Tyne	United Kingdom	For John Murphy & Co.
September	Rey Don Francisco de Assis	Man-of-war	Reales Astilleros de Esteiro	Ferrol	Spain	For Spanish Navy.
September	Thalestris	Clipper			United Kingdom	For St. George Line of Packets.
1 October	Anita	Steamship	Messrs. Samuda Bros.	Blackwall	United Kingdom	For Magdalena Steam Navigation Company.
3 October	Crest of the Wave	Full-rigged ship	William Pile Jr.	Sunderland	United Kingdom	For Brice, Friend & Co.
4 October	Eagle Wing	Medium clipper	James O. Curtis	Medford, Massachusetts	United States	For Chase & Tappan.
4 October	Great Republic	Extreme clipper	Donald McKay	Boston, Massachusetts	United States	For Donald McKay. Largest wooden clipper ship ever built.
4 October	Hesperus	Cutter yacht	Robinson	Gosport	United Kingdom	For Nathaniel Montefiore.
4 October	Lady Hodgkinson	Full-rigged ship	John Watson	Pallion	United Kingdom	For George E. Hodgkinson.
4 October	Matilda Wattenbach	Full-rigged ship	F. C. Clark	Saint Helier	Jersey	For Messrs. J. & J. Melhuish. Ran aground on launching, later refloated.
4 October	Menuara	Steamship	Messrs. Miller, Ravenhill & Salkeld	Walker	United Kingdom	For Australasian and Pacific Mail Steam Packet Company.
4 October	Morning Star	Clipper	Tobey & Littlefield	Portsmouth, New Hampshire	United States	For T. B. Waters & Co.
4 October	Sultan	Barque	George Worth	Southwick	United Kingdom	For Mr. Lawson.
4 October	Tayleur	Full-rigged ship	Bank Quay Foundry Company	Warrington	United Kingdom	For Charles Moore & Company.
5 October	Edwin Forrest	Clipper	Daniel D. Kelly	East Boston, Massachusetts	United States	For Crosby, Crocker & Cp.
5 October	Euryalus	Frigate		Chatham Dockyard	United Kingdom	For Royal Navy.
5 October	Lady Elizabeth	Barque	John Smith	Pallion	United Kingdom	For J. Tyler.
6 October	Dreadnought	Medium clipper	Currier & Townsend	Newburyport, Massachusetts	United States	For F. B. Cutting, E. D. Morgan, David Ogden and associates.
6 October	Express	Steamship	S. Earle	Hull	United Kingdom	For W. Priest.
6 October	Guiding Star	Barque	George Booth	Sunderland	United Kingdom	For private owner.
7 October	Glengariff	Barque	Lawson Gales	South Hylton	United Kingdom	For Dealy & Co.
8 October	David Brown	Extreme clipper	Roosevelt & Joyce	New York	United States	For A. A. Low & Brother.
8 October	Gravina	Clipper	Isaac C. Smith & Son	Hoboken, New Jersey	United States	For Loring Brothers.
10 October	Lookout	Clipper	Chase & Davis	Warren, Rhode Island	United States	For E. Buckley & Sons.
10 October	Tyrone	Full-rigged ship	John Meahan	Bathurst	(United Kingdom of Great Britain and Ireland) Colony of New Brunswick	For private owner.
11 October	Panama	Extreme clipper	Thomas Collyer	New York	United States	For N. L. & G. Griswold.
18 October	Davy Crockett	Clipper	Greenman & Company	Mystic, Connecticut	United States	For Handy & Everett.
22 October	Peiki Zafer	Ship of the line		Constantinople	Ottoman Empire	For Ottoman Navy.
23 October	Romance of the Seas	Extreme clipper	Donald McKay	East Boston, Massachusetts	United States	For George B. Upton.
31 October	Tourville	Tourville-class ship of the line		Brest	France	For French Navy.
October	Henry Reed	Barque	T. & B. Tiffin	Sunderland	United Kingdom	For Walker & Co.
October	Miss Mag	Clipper			United States	For private owner.
October	Salacia	Merchantman		Lyme Regis	United Kingdom	For Mr. Mansfield.
October	Velocity	Full-rigged ship	Messrs. Holmes & Sons	Middlesbrough	United Kingdom	For private owner.
2 November	Flying Scud	Extreme clipper	Metcalf & Norris	Damariscotta, Maine	United States	For private owner.
2 November	Red Jacket	Extreme clipper	George Thomas	Rockland, Maine	United States	For Seacomb & Taylor.
3 November	Ottawa	Steamship	John Laird	Birkenhead	United Kingdom	For Canada Steam Navigation Company.
5 November	Aurora	Extreme clipper	John Taylor	Chelsea, Massachusetts	United States	For Pickman, Silbee & Allen.
5 November	City of Sydney	Steamship	Messrs Smith & Rodger	Govan	United Kingdom	For Australasian Steam Navigation Company.
16 November	Falkland	Frigate		Bombay	India	For British East India Company.
17 November	Golden Fleece	Steamship	Messrs. Mare.	Blackwall	United Kingdom	For General Screw Steam Shipping Company.
19 November	Henry Moore	Clipper	Messrs. John Scott & Son	Greenock	United Kingdom	For Messrs. Henry Moore & Co.
23 November	Margaret Deane	Merchantman	Messrs. Rennie, Johson & Rankin	Liverpool	United Kingdom	For private owner.
30 November	Dunbar	Full-rigged ship	James Laing	Sunderland	United Kingdom	For Duncan Dunbar.
30 November	Viking	Clipper	Trufant & Drummond	Bath, Maine	United States	For George Hussey.
November	Enterprise	Steamship	Messrs. Ruthven	River Clyde	United Kingdom	For Deep Sea Fishing Association of Scotland.
November	Faerie Queen	Barque	William Pile Jr.	Sunderland	United Kingdom	For J. R. Kelso.
November	Jane Leech	Clipper	Cox	Bideford	United Kingdom	For private owner.
November	Lady Raglan	Barque			(United Kingdom of Great Britain and Ireland) Colony of Prince Edward Island	For private owner.
November	Liddesdale	Barque	Hardie	Southwick	United Kingdom	For Messrs. Montgomery & Black.
November	Margaret Mitchell	Full-rigged ship	Messrs. Archibald McMillan & Son	Dumbarton	United Kingdom	For Mr. Mitchell.
November	Nonpareil	Medium clipper	Dunham & Co.	Frankfort, Maine	United States	For Dunham & Co.
November	Oltenitza	Ship of the line		Sinope	Ottoman Empire	For Ottoman Navy.
November	Spirit of the Deep	Merchantman	J. T. Alcock	Sunderland	United Kingdom	For private owner.
November	Springbok	Barque	John Westacott	Barnstaple	United Kingdom	For Messrs. Steward & Co.
1 December	Majestic	Second rate		Chatham Dockyard	United Kingdom	For Royal Navy.
1 December	Red Gauntlet	Clipper	James W. Cox	Robbinston, Maine	United States	For F. Boyd & Co.
1 December	Rolling Wave	Full-rigged ship	E. Young	South Shields	United Kingdom	For private owner.
2 December	Annibal	Steamship		Lorient	United Kingdom	For French Navy.
2 December	Beaumanoir	Brig		Cherbourg	France	For French Navy.
2 December	Duquesne	Tourville-class ship of the line		Brest	France	For French Navy.
2 December	Fleurus	Fleurus-class ship of the line		Toulon	France	For French Navy.
2 December	Prince Jérôme	Hercule-class ship of the line			France	For French Navy.
3 December	Augusta	Schooner		Bombay	India	For British East India Company.
3 December	Enniskillen	Paddle Steamer	Messrs. T. Vernon & Co.	Liverpool	United Kingdom	For North West of Ireland Union Steam Packet Company.
3 December	Mark That	Schooner	Mark Pearson	Goole	United Kingdom	For Messrs. E. Laverack & Co.
3 December	Talavera	Clipper	Messrs. Cato, Miller & Co.	Liverpool	United Kingdom	For Messrs. Miller, Houghton & Co.
14 December	Deptford	Barque	Messrs. Hodgson & Gardener	North Hylton	United Kingdom	For Messrs. J. & T. Robinson.
17 December	Criterion	Pilot boat		Ipswich	United Kingdom	For Liverpool Pilots.
19 December	Challenger	Extreme clipper	Robert E. Jackson	East Boston, Massachusetts	United States	For W. & F. H. Whittemore.
22 December	Huron	Full-rigged ship	George Barker	Sunderland	United Kingdom	For E. Lumsdon & Sons.
22 December	Wallachia	Brig	Messrs. J. & J. Robinson	Deptford	United Kingdom	For T. & J. Marwood.
22 December	Express	Barque	John Barkes	Sunderland	United Kingdom	For Mr. Smurthwaite.
23 December	Mary Hardy	Full-rigged ship	Joseph Wheeler	Cork	United Kingdom	For private owner.
31 December	Chilena	Coaster	Messrs. Thomas Royden & Sons	Liverpool	United Kingdom	For Royden & James Tyrer.
31 December	Lightning	Clipper		Boston, Massachusetts	United States	For Black Ball Line.
31 December	Undaunted	Merchantman	Messrs. Hall & Sons	Aberdeen	United Kingdom	For John Brown.
31 December	Vision	Full-rigged ship	Messrs. Hall & Sons	Aberdeen	United Kingdom	For James Beazley.
December	Herald of the Morning	Medium clipper	Hayden & Cudworth,	Medford, Massachusetts	United States	For Thatcher Magoun & Co.
December	John Sugars	Barque	Havelock & Hobson	Monkwearmouth	United Kingdom	For Sugars & Co.
Spring	Sapphire	Full-rigged ship	Russell	Quebec	(United Kingdom of Great Britain and Ireland) Province of Canada	For private owner.
Summer	Alma	Mersey flat			United Kingdom	For private owner.
Autumn	David G. Fleming	Full-rigged ship			(United Kingdom of Great Britain and Ireland) Colony of New Brunswick	For Read & Co.
Unknown date	Abana	Merchantman		Dundee	United Kingdom	For private owner.
Unknown date	Abbey	Brigantine		Newcastle	United Kingdom	For Muir & Co.
Unknown date	Absalom	Ketch	David Roberts	Sydney	(United Kingdom of Great Britain and Ireland) New South Wales	For J. Hubbard.
Unknown date	African	Full-rigged ship	John Smith	Pallion	United Kingdom	For James C. Gregg.
Unknown date	Agnes	Cutter	James Bevan	Sydney Harbour	(United Kingdom of Great Britain and Ireland) New South Wales	For Henry Hardy.
Unknown date	Albatross	Barque	Ralph Hutchinson	Sunderland	United Kingdom	For A. Strong.
Unknown date	Alice	Schooner	William Bonker	Salcombe	United Kingdom	For Richard H. Sladen, Robert Hurrell and others.
Unknown date	Amphitrite	Clipper	Samuel Hall	East Boston, Massachusetts	United States	For private owner.
Unknown date	Anglo Saxon	Clipper	F. W. Rhodes	Rockland, Maine	United States	For E. M. Robertson.
Unknown date	Ann	Schooner	H. Carr	Sunderland	United Kingdom	For George Dowell.
Unknown date	Anne	Brig		Blyth	United Kingdom	For private owner.
Unknown date	Annie C. Maguire	Barque			United Kingdom	For private owner.
Unknown date	Antipodes	Full-rigged ship	James Laing	Sunderland	United Kingdom	For Mr. Riddell.
Unknown date	Arabia	Paddle steamer		Brownsville, Pennsylvania	United States	For William Terrill and William Boyd.
Unknown date	Argentina	Paddle steamer	John Laird	Birkenhead	United Kingdom	For South American and General Steam Navigation Company.
Unknown date	Argo	Steamship	C. J. Mare and Company	Leamouth	United Kingdom	For General Screw Steam Shipping Company.
Unknown date	Augusta	Paddle steamer	William H. Webb	New York	United States	For New York and Savannah Steam Navigation Company.
Unknown date	Aurifera	Barque	Forrest & Co.	Sunderland	United Kingdom	For Mr. Schlessinger.
Unknown date	Auxilar	Barque	George Worthy	Southwick	United Kingdom	For Mr. Hansell.
Unknown date	Avalanche	Merchantman		Dundee	United Kingdom	For private owner.
Unknown date	Balbec	Steamship		River Clyde, Glasgow	United Kingdom	For Cunard Line.
Unknown date	Baltic	Merchantman		Dundee	United Kingdom	For private owner.
Unknown date	Banshee	Barque	William Spowers	Hylton	United Kingdom	For Potts & Co.
Unknown date	Barbara Ann	Snow	Dennis Douglas	Southwick	United Kingdom	For Potts & Co.
Unknown date	Beecher Stowe	Barque	Ratcliffe, Spence & Co.	Sunderland	United Kingdom	For George Avery.
Unknown date	Bella Donna	Barque	Robert Reay	North Hylton	United Kingdom	For J. How.
Unknown date	Black Warrior	Medium clipper	Austin & Company	Damariscotta, Maine	United States	For William Wilson & Son.
Unknown date	Buchanan	Barque	Buchanan & Gibson	Sunderland	United Kingdom	For Mr. Buchanan.
Unknown date	Burmah	Full-rigged ship	Booth & Blacklock	Sunderland	United Kingdom	For Blair & Co.
Unknown date	Bury St. Edmunds	Full-rigged ship	William Wilkinson	Deptford	United Kingdom	For Blyths & Green.
Unknown date	Byzantium	Barque	Ratcliffe, Spence & Co	Sunderland	United Kingdom	For Clough & Co.
Unknown date	Cairo	Barque	Thomas Lightfoot	Hylton Dene	United Kingdom	For Glaholm & Co.
Unknown date	Calabar	Full-rigged ship	Arrow Leithead	Pallion	United Kingdom	For John Hay.
Unknown date	Caldera	Full-rigged ship	Robert Thompson & Sons	Sunderland	United Kingdom	For John Hay.
Unknown date	Callao	Clipper		Honfleur	France	For private owner.
Unknown date	Catherine Pemberton	Barque	John Smith	Pallion	United Kingdom	For Mr. Pemberton.
Unknown date	Chief of Clippers	Clipper		Black Rock, Connecticut	United States	For private owner.
Unknown date	Clara	Full-rigged ship	J. Haswell	Sunderland	United Kingdom	For John Henry Luscombe.
Unknown date	Climax	Clipper	Hayden & Cudworth	Medford, Massachusetts	United States	For Howes & Crowell.
Unknown date	Clinton	Ferry	Domingo Marcucci	San Francisco, California	United States	For Conta Costa Steam Navigation Company.
Unknown date	Closs Merden	Full-rigged ship	Hillyard	Portland	(United Kingdom of Great Britain and Ireland) Colony of New Brunswick	For Messrs. J. D. W. Spurr & Co.
Unknown date	Coeur de Lion	Paddle steamer			United States	For unknown owner.
Unknown date	Collaroy	Paddle steamer	John Laird & Son & Co.	Birkenhead	United Kingdom	For Hunter's River Steam Navigation Co.
Unknown date	Conciliator	Barque	Hodgson & Gardner	Hylton	United Kingdom	For Mr. Atkinson.
Unknown date	Countess of Bective	Barque	T. & B. Tiffin	Sunderland	United Kingdom	For Nicholson & Co.
Unknown date	Criterion	Barque	James Laing	Sunderland	United Kingdom	For John Longton.
Unknown date	Dancing Feather	Pilot boat	Dennison J. Lawlor	East Boston, Massachusetts	United States	For San Francisco Pilots.
Unknown date	Diana	Frigate			Russia	For Imperial Russian Navy.
Unknown date	Dumfries	Barque	G. W. & W. J. Hall	Sunderland	United Kingdom	For Mr. Thompson.
Unknown date	Eaglet	Snow	R. H. Potts & Brothers	Sunderland	United Kingdom	For Potts & Co.
Unknown date	Earl of Shaftesbury	Full-rigged ship	Booth & Blacklock	Sunderland	United Kingdom	For P. Tindall.
Unknown date	E. D. T.	Barque	Pile & Smart	Sunderland	United Kingdom	For Mr. Thompson.
Unknown date	Eena	Barque	William Wilkinson	Deptford	United Kingdom	For J. Towse.
Unknown date	Egmont	Full-rigged ship	John Haswell	Sunderland	United Kingdom	For Willis & Co.
Unknown date	Elizabeth Kimball	Clipper	Edward Dutton	Marblehead, Massachusetts	United States	For Edward Kimball.
Unknown date	Elizabeth Wright	Schooner	Robert Thompson & Sons	Sunderland	United Kingdom	For Wright & Co.
Unknown date	Ellwood Walter	Pilot boat	Edward F. Williams	New York	United Kingdom	For Joseph Henderson, Charles W. Hawthorne, Augustus H. Murphy, William J. Murphy and Thomass Orr.
Unknown date	Epsom	Full-rigged ship	G. W. & W. J. Hall	Sunderland	United Kingdom	For Temperley & Co.
Unknown date	Eva	Barque	Hodgson & Gardiner	North Hylton	United Kingdom	For Hick & Co.
Unknown date	Eva	Merchantman		Dundee	United Kingdom	For private owner.
Unknown date	Evangeline	Passenger ship	Messrs. Jordan & Getty		United Kingdom	For private owner.
Unknown date	Expedient	Snow	Austin & Mills	Southwick	United Kingdom	For D. Morice.
Unknown date	Express	Snow	Edward Bailey	Pallion	United Kingdom	For J. Crisp.
Unknown date	Fairy	Paddle steamer		San Francisco, California	United States	For private owner.
Unknown date	Fingal	Barque	G. W. & W. J. Hall	Sunderland	United Kingdom	For James Crosby.
Unknown date	Flag of Truce	Barque	S. Hodgson	Sunderland	United Kingdom	For D. Cowan.
Unknown date	Fleda	Merchantman		Dundee	United Kingdom	For private owner.
Unknown date	Flora Temple	Medium clipper	J. Abraham	Baltimore, Maryland	United States	For Abraham & Ashcroft.
Unknown date	Flyaway	Extreme clipper	William H. Webb	New York	United States	For Schiff Brothers & Co.
Unknown date	Flying Dragon	Barque	John Pile	Sunderland	United Kingdom	For Robert Smith.
Unknown date	Geffrard	Brig	Fred Clark	Jersey	Jersey	For private owner.
Unknown date	Gem	Merchantman	George Barker	Sunderland	United Kingdom	For private owner.
Unknown date	George Avery	Barque	George Short	Sunderland	United Kingdom	For George Avery.
Unknown date	George Danthwaite	Merchantman		Dundee	United Kingdom	For private owner.
Unknown date	George Page	Paddle steamer		Washington, Virginia	United States	For private owner.
Unknown date	George Peabody	Clipper	J. O. Curtis	Medford, Massachusetts	United States	For William F. Weld & Co.
Unknown date	Gipsy	Merchantman		Dundee	United Kingdom	For private owner.
Unknown date	Guiding Star	Clipper	J. Currier	Newburyport, Massachusetts	United States	For Charles Hill & Co.
Unknown date	Helen	Snow	Hume & Easson	Sunderland	United Kingdom	For Mr. Greenwell.
Unknown date	Highlander	Barque	R. H. Potts & Bros.	Sunderland	United Kingdom	For Potts Bros.
Unknown date	H.N. Gambrill	Schooner			United States	For private owner.
Unknown date	Hope	Steamship	John Laird	Birkenhead	United Kingdom	For African Mail Steamship Company.
Unknown date	Idalia	Barque	Todd & Brown	North Hylton	United Kingdom	For Mr. Thompson.
Unknown date	Indemnity	Full-rigged ship	John Watson	Pallion	United Kingdom	For T. Chodwick.
Unknown date	Integrity	Barque	Thomas Robson	Claxheugh	United Kingdom	For Storey & Co.
Unknown date	Iserbrook	Brig	Reiherstieg Schiffswerfte & Maschinenfabrik	Hamburg	Hamburg	For Johan César VI Godeffroy.
Unknown date	Isle of France	Barque	Forest & Co	Sunderland	United Kingdom	For Binney & Co.
Unknown date	Istamboul	Snow	John & James Robinson	Deptford	United Kingdom	For Mr. Marwood.
Unknown date	Jacob Strader	Steamboat		Cincinnati, Ohio	United States	For U.S. Mail Line.
Unknown date	Jarrow	Sloop		Sunderland	United Kingdom	For private owner.
Unknown date	Jamestown	Paddle steamer	William H. Webb	New York	United States	For New York and Old Dominion Line.
Unknown date	Jefferson Davis	Cushing-class schooner	J. M. Hood	Bristol, Rhode Island	United States	For United States Revenue Cutter Service.
Unknown date	Jessica	Merchantman		Dundee	United Kingdom	For private owner.
Unknown date	Jessie	Snow	Bartram & Lister	Sunderland	United Kingdom	For D. Mackie.
Unknown date	John Banks	Full-rigged ship	William R. Abby	Sunderland	United Kingdom	For J. Banks.
Unknown date	John Nussey	Schooner	William R. Abbay	Sunderland	United Kingdom	For J. Banks.
Unknown date	Joseph Tarratt	Merchantman			(United Kingdom of Great Britain and Ireland) Colony of New Brunswick	For Messrs. J. and R. Reed & Messrs. W. and R. Wright.
Unknown date	Josiah A. Bell	Steamship			United Kingdom	For private owner.
Unknown date	Kervan-i Bahri	Frigate	Tersâne-i Âmire	Constantinople	Ottoman Empire	For Ottoman Navy.
Unknown date	Kingfisher	Clipper	Hayden & Cudworth	Medford, Massachusetts	United States	For William Lincoln.
Unknown date	Kathay	Clipper	Jacob A. Westervelt	New York	United States	For private owner.
Unknown date	Kingston	Full-rigged ship	William Pile Jr.	Sunderland	United Kingdom	For J. Lidgett.
Unknown date	Lady Aberdour	Snow	Ratcliff & Spence	Sunderland	United Kingdom	For Hall & Co.
Unknown date	Launceston	Full-rigged ship	James Briggs & Co	Pallion	United Kingdom	For Mr. Beckwith.
Unknown date	Leichardt	Merchantman		Aberdeen	United Kingdom	For private owner.
Unknown date	Lemuella	Barque	John Barkes	Sunderland	United Kingdom	For Reynolds & Co.
Unknown date	Leonidas	Full-rigged ship	William Wilkinson	Sunderland	United Kingdom	For Towse & Co.
Unknown date	Libertas	Barque	James Hardie	Sunderland	United Kingdom	For Edward J. Gourley.
Unknown date	Lightfoot	Clipper	Jackson & Ewell	East Boston, Massachusetts	United States	For private owner.
Unknown date	Live Yankee	Extreme clipper	Horace Merrriam	Rockland, Maine	United States	For George W. Brown and others.
Unknown date	Lizzie Aisbitt	Barque	Pile & Smart	Sunderland	United Kingdom	For Aisbitt & Co.
Unknown date	Lookout	Clipper	Chase & Davis	Warren, Rhode Island	United States	For E. buckley & Sons.
Unknown date	Lord Burleigh	Barque	Wilson Chilton	Sunderland	United Kingdom	For Blair & Co.
Unknown date	Lord Hardinge	Barque	Havelock & Robson	Sunderland	United Kingdom	For T. Rutherford.
Unknown date	Lord of the Isles	Clipper	Charles Scott & Co.	Greenock	United Kingdom	For private owner.
Unknown date	Maid of Judah	Clipper		Aberdeen	United Kingdom	For private owner.
Unknown date	Maréchal de Turenne	Clipper		Bordeaux	France	For private owner.
Unknown date	Margaretta	Snow	William Crown	Southwick	United Kingdom	For J. Brooks.
Unknown date	Marioupoul	Snow	John & James Robinson	Deptford	United Kingdom	For Mrwood & Co.
Unknown date	Martha and Jane	Barque	Hume & Easson	Pallion	United Kingdom	For Mr. Robinson.
Unknown date	Martha Kay	Barque	Todd & Brown	North Hylton	United Kingdom	For T. Kay.
Unknown date	Mary	Snow	George Worthy	Southwick	United Kingdom	For Mackie & Co.
Unknown date	Mary Ann & James	Barque	Todd & Brown	North Hylton	United Kingdom	For Ogilsby & Co.
Unknown date	Matoaka	Full-rigged ship			(United Kingdom of Great Britain and Ireland) Colony of New Brunswick	For Willis, Gunn & Co.
Unknown date	Melanie	Snow	Edward Bailey	Pallion	United Kingdom	For E. Hickey.
Unknown date	Melpomene	Barque	George Booth	Sunderland	United Kingdom	For C. Palmer.
Unknown date	Merse	Full-rigged ship	William Byers	Sunderland	United Kingdom	For John Willis.
Unknown date	Monarch	Paddle steamer		Fulton, Ohio	United States	For private owner.
Unknown date	Mount Savage	Steamship		Philadelphia, Pennsylvania	United States	For private owner.
Unknown date	Myrtle	Full-rigged ship	Hylton Carr	North Hylton	United Kingdom	For E. Chapman.
Unknown date	Nelsons	Snow	S. Hodgson	Sunderland	United Kingdom	For H. Nelson.
Unknown date	Ocean Herald	Clipper		Damariscotta, Maine	United States	For Everett & Brown.
Unknown date	Odessa Packet	Merchantman	John & James Robinson	Deptford	United Kingdom	For J. Smith.
Unknown date	Oithona	Full-rigged ship	J. & J. Robinson, or James Robinson	Sunderland	United Kingdom	For J. Michael.
Unknown date	Oracle	Clipper	Chapman & Flint	Thomaston, Maine	United States	For private owner.
Unknown date	Orädd	Man of war			Sweden	For Royal Swedish Navy.
Unknown date	Orient	Full-rigged ship	Thomas Bilbe	Rotherhithe	United Kingdom	For James Thompson & Co.
Unknown date	Palmyra	Full-rigged ship	Peter Austin	Sunderland	United Kingdom	For J. Allan.
Unknown date	Planter	Merchantman		Dundee	United Kingdom	For private owner.
Unknown date	Polmaine	Merchantman		Dundee	United Kingdom	For private owner.
Unknown date	Pudsey Dawson	Clipper		Whitehaven	United Kingdom	For H. R. Hoskins.
Unknown date	Parker Vein	Steamship	Hillman and Streaker	Philadelphia, Pennsylvania	United States	For private owner.
Unknown date	P. C. E.	Barque		Sunderland	United Kingdom	For H. Ellis.
Unknown date	Pelican	Barque	John Reed	Coxgreen	United Kingdom	For Curry & Co.
Unknown date	Philo	Barque	Austin & Mills	Sunderland	United Kingdom	For Mills & Co.
Unknown date	Pilgrim	Snow	J. Candlish	Sunderland	United Kingdom	For Joseph Culliford.
Unknown date	Portia	Barque	Hylton Carr	North Hylton	United Kingdom	For H. Ellis.
Unknown date	Pride of America	Clipper		Richmond Maine	United States	For private owner.
Unknown date	Pride of the Ocean	Clipper	Daniel Foster	Providence, Rhode Island	United States	For Cady, Aldrich & Reid.
Unknown date	Pride of the Sea	Clipper	Foster & Boose	Baltimore, Maryland	United States	For James Hooper & Co.
Unknown date	Primula	Barque	George Barker	Sunderland	United Kingdom	For J. Alcock.
Unknown date	Queen of the East	Full-rigged ship	William Olive	Carleton	(United Kingdom of Great Britain and Ireland) Colony of New Brunswick	For private owner.
Unknown date	Quickstep	Clipper		Freeport, Maine	United States	For Dunham & Dimon.
Unknown date	Quito	Clipper		Nantes	France	For private owner.
Unknown date	Regina	Full-rigged ship		Sunderland	United Kingdom	For Brass & Co.
Unknown date	Resolution	Barque	W. H. Pearson	Sunderland	United Kingdom	For Clark & Co.
Unknown date	Reward	Snow	W. Johnson	Sunderland	United Kingdom	For Mr. Sutherland.
Unknown date	Ringleader	Clipper	Hayden & Cudworth	Medford, Massachusetts	United States	For Howes & Crowell.
Unknown date	Robert Morrison	Merchantman		Sunderland	United Kingdom	For Mr. Morrison.
Unknown date	Rose	Barque	John Crown	Southwick	United Kingdom	For Crown & Co.
Unknown date	Rover's Bride	Clipper		Baltimore, Maryland	United States	For J. D. Nason.
Unknown date	Royal Lily	Barque		Sunderland	United Kingdom	For Mr. Briggs.
Unknown date	Salamanca	Full-rigged ship	John Crown	Sunderland	United Kingdom	For Duncan Dunbar.
Unknown date	Sea Gull	Merchantman		Dundee	United Kingdom	For private owner.
Unknown date	Sea King	Merchantman		Dundee	United Kingdom	For private owner.
Unknown date	Sea Nymph	Medium clipper	Reuben Fiske & Co.	Fairhaven, Massachusetts	United States	For Edward Mott Robinson.
Unknown date	Shields	Merchantman		Sunderland	United Kingdom	For Mr. Atkinson.
Unknown date	Shōhei Maru	Frigate	Sakurajima	Kagoshima	Japan	For Imperial Japanese Navy.
Unknown date	Silistria	Snow	John & James Robinson	Deptford	United Kingdom	For Mr. Marwood.
Unknown date	Sir William Gomm	Full-rigged ship	John Smith	Pallion	United Kingdom	For Blyths & Greene.
Unknown date	Sitka	Full-rigged ship		Hamburg	Hamburg	For private owner.
Unknown date	Snowflake	Merchantman		Aberdeen	United Kingdom	For private owner.
Unknown date	Solstice	Barque		Sunderland	United Kingdom	For T. Walker.
Unknown date	Sparkling Wave	Medium clipper	Mason Barney	Swansea, Massachusetts	United States	For private owner.
Unknown date	Spirit of the Times	Clipper	Messrs. Cooper & Abraham, or Cooper & Slicer	Baltimore, Maryland	United States	For Aymore & Co.
Unknown date	Star of Empire	Packet ship	Donald McKay	Boston, Massachusetts	United States	For Messrs. Train & Co.
Unknown date	St. Kilda	Schooner		Littlehampton	United Kingdom	For private owner.
Unknown date	Storm King	Medium clipper	John Taylor	Chelsea, Massachusetts	United States	For Snow & Rich.
Unknown date	Sumter	Paddle steamer			United States	For private owner.
Unknown date	Sunderland	Merchantman		Sunderland	United Kingdom	For J. Barry.
Unknown date	Swanley	Barque	W. Briggs	Sunderland	United Kingdom	For J. Shepherd.
Unknown date	Sweepstakes	Clipper	Danel and Aaron Westervelt	New York	United States	For Chambers & Heiser.
Unknown date	Talavera	Full-rigged ship	William Harkass	Sunderland	United Kingdom	For Duff & Co.
Unknown date	Tamora	Merchantman		Dundee	United Kingdom	For private owner.
Unknown date	Telegraph	Full-rigged ship		Saint John	(United Kingdom of Great Britain and Ireland) Colony of New Brunswick	For private owner.
Unknown date	Tennessee	Paddle steamer	John A. Robb	Baltimore, Maryland	United States	For James Hooper.
Unknown date	Thalestris	Clipper			United Kingdom	For private owner.
Unknown date	Truro	Barque		Sunderland	United Kingdom	For J. Laing.
Unknown date	Undaunted	Medium clipper	Hall, Snow & Co	Bath, Maine	United States	For W. H. Foster & Co.
Unknown date	Velikiy Knyaz Konstantin	First rate			Russia	For Imperial Russian Navy.
Unknown date	Vesta	Fishing vessel	Hernoux et Compagnie	Nantes	France	For Société Terreneuvienne.
Unknown date	Victoria	Paddle tug			United Kingdom	For William Watkins Ltd.
Unknown date	Violet	Merchantman		Sunderland	United Kingdom	For J. Alcock.
Unknown date	Wallamet	Paddle steamer	John T. Thomas	Canemah	(United States) Oregon Territory	For John McCrosky and associates.
Unknown date	Wamsutta	Steamship		Hoboken, New Jersey	United States	For private owner.
Unknown date	Waverley	Clipper	Joshua Magoun	Charlestown, Massachusetts	United States	For Thomas Curtis, Thaddeus Nichols and others.
Unknown date	Western Port	Steamship		Philadelphia, Pennsylvania	United States	For private owner.
Unknown date	White Falcon	Clipper		Pittston, Maine	United States	For M. O. Roberts.
Unknown date	Wide Awake	Clipper	Perrine, Patterson & Stack	Williamsburg, New York	United States	For private owner.
Unknown date	Wild Rover	Clipper	Austin & Hall	Damariscotta, Maine	United States	For Alpheus Hardy & Co.
Unknown date	William & Jane	Merchantman	Pile & Smart	Sunderland	United Kingdom	For T. Hunter.
Unknown date	William Hammond	Full-rigged ship		Sunderland	United Kingdom	For Mr. Hammond.
Unknown date	William Miles	Merchantman	Charles Jobin	Quebec	(United Kingdom of Great Britain and Ireland) Province of Canada	For Miles & Co.
Unknown date	Wizard	Extreme clipper	Samuel Hall	East Boston, Massachusetts	United States	For Samuel Hall.
Unknown date	Young America	Clipper	William H. Webb	New York	United States	For George B. Daniels.
Unknown date	Young Australian	Paddle steamer			(United Kingdom of Great Britain and Ireland) Unknown	For private owner.
Unknown date	Young Brander	Clipper	Jotham Stetson	Chelsea, Massachusetts	United States	For Brander, Williams & Co.
