= List of shipwrecks in 1872 =

The list of shipwrecks in 1872 includes ships sunk, foundered, grounded, or otherwise lost during 1872.

table of contents
← 1871 / 1872 / 1873 →
Jan	Feb	Mar	Apr
May	Jun	Jul	Aug
Sep	Oct	Nov	Dec
Unknown date

== Unknown date ==
List of shipwrecks: Unknown date 1872
Ship	State	Description
Annie Scott	United Kingdom	The ship departed from Shanghai, China on "31 September" for Hiogo, Japan. No further trace, presumed foundered with the loss of all hands.
Black Diamond	South Australia	The steamship was driven ashore and wrecked between Moonta and Wallaroo.
Braunstone	United Kingdom	The steamship was abandoned at sea between 9 January and 15 July. She was on a voyage from Cardiff, Glamorgan to Pacasmayo, Peru.
Correo de Lebu	Chile	The ship was wrecked on the south coast of Chile.
Chuckiang	China	The steamship was wrecked in the Hainan Strait. She was on a voyage from Hong Kong to Shanghai.
Clarence	New South Wales	The steamship was driven ashore and wrecked between Bald Hill and "Norogora". She was on a voyage from Sydney to Port Macquarie
Coryphæus	United Kingdom	The ship was wrecked at Aila, Ottoman Syria. At least five crew survived.
Don Leandro	Flag unknown	The 86-ton two-masted lumber schooner was wrecked. She was refloated, repaired, and returned to service.
Doon	United Kingdom	The ship was lost in the South China Sea. Her crew took to two boats. Six crew in one of the boats were rescued by the barque Veritas (Sweden). Those in the other boat were reported missing.
Elizabeth Fry	United Kingdom	The ship was wrecked between 26 January and 9 February. She was on a voyage from New Orleans, Louisiana, United States to Liverpool, Lancashire.
Fanny Campbell	United Kingdom	The ship was wrecked in the Banks Islands. Her crew were rescued.
Glenmark	United Kingdom	The clipper left Lyttelton Harbour, New Zealand, for Gravesend, Kent in early 1872 with a cargo of wool and fifty people on board. Presumed foundered with the loss of all on board.
Hannah Bloomfield	New South Wales	The ship ran aground. She was on a voyage from Sydney to Cleveland Bay, Queensland.
Huntsman	United Kingdom	The sealer, a brig was lost in ice off Cape St. Charles, Newfoundland Colony with the loss of 45 of her 61 crew.
James Merriman	Flag unknown	The barque was wrecked in the Torres Strait.
Lola Montes	Queensland	The ship was wrecked. She was on a voyage from Brisbane to Cleveland Bay.
Maggie Wright	United States	The ship was destroyed by fire at Kingston, Jamaica on 9 August or 9 September.
Mohican	United States	The decommissioned steam sloop-of-war sank at her moorings at Mare Island Navy Yard in Vallejo, California, during the second half of the year. She was refloated, beached, and scrapped.
Panther	Flag unknown	The steamer was lost in the vicinity of "Squan Beach," a term used at the time for the coast of New Jersey, United States near Manasquan and sometimes for the 7-mile (11 km) stretch of coast between Manasquan Inlet and Cranberry Inlet or for the entire coast of New Jersey between Sea Girt and Barnegat Inlet.
Petrel	New South Wales	The schooner was wrecked in the New Hebrides.
USS Picket Boat No. 5	United States	The torpedo boat was lost.
Rusland	Belgium	Rusland The steamship ran aground and was lost.
Russia	United States	The steamship struck a sunken rock and sank in Lake Erie off Amherstburg, Ontario, Canada in November or December. She was refloated, repaired and returned to service.
Sarah Anne Blanche	(United Kingdom of Great Britain and Ireland) Tasmania	The ship was wrecked.
Sarah M.	United Kingdom	The ship foundered in the Atlantic Ocean between 9 April and 13 May. Her crew were rescued by Bucephalus ( (Dominion of Newfoundland) Newfoundland Colony). Sarah M. was on a voyage from Penarth, Glamorgan to Quebec City, Canada.
Solarie Brignardello	Italy	The ship was lost off Cape Horn, Chile. Her crew were rescued.
Sophie	United States	The ship was wrecked on Honshu, Japan with the loss of two of her crew.
Sunshine	United Kingdom	The ship departed from Richibucto, New Brunswick, Canada for Liverpool in late November or early December. No further trace, presumed foundered with the loss of all hands.
Suwo Nada	Flag unknown	The steamship was lost in the South China Sea.Her crew were rescued.
Theophile Marie	France	The ship departed from Brest, Finistère for Gloucester, United Kingdom between 12 October and 15 November. No further trace, presumed foundered with the loss of all hands.
Ticonderoga	United States	The clipper was wrecked off the coast of India.
Tuhlee	China	The tug was wrecked. She was on a voyage from Fuzhou to Shanghai.
Waimea	New South Wales	The steamship was wrecked in the Richmond River.
William J. Dale	United States	The fishing schooner was lost returning from the Bay of Islands, Newfoundland, in November 1872, but never reached port. Lost with all 9 hands.
Young Australian	South Australia	The paddle tug sank at the mouth of the Roper River.
