= List of shipwrecks in June 1875 =

The list of shipwrecks in June 1875 includes ships sunk, foundered, grounded, or otherwise lost during June 1875.

== 1 June ==
List of shipwrecks: 1 June 1875
Ship	State	Description
Vicksburg	United Kingdom	The steamship collided with an iceberg and sank in the Atlantic Ocean off Cape Race, Newfoundland Colony with the loss of 72 of the 89 people on board. Five survivors were rescued by the steamship State of Georgia (United Kingdom) and twelve were rescued by a Newfoundland fishing smack.

== 2 June ==
List of shipwrecks: 2 June 1875
Ship	State	Description
Poyang	China	The steamship foundered in a typhoon at Macao with the loss of about 100 lives. There were sixteen survivors. She was on a voyage from Hong Kong to Macao.
No. 2	United Kingdom	The ship foundered in the Atlantic Ocean. Her crew were rescued by Johanna Kepler (Germany). No. 2 was on a voyage from Poole, Dorset to New York, United States.

== 3 June ==
List of shipwrecks: 3 June 1875
Ship	State	Description
A. M. B.	United Kingdom	The ship collided with the steamship Bertha (United Kingdom) in the River Thames and was beached at Tilbury Fort, Essex in a waterlogged condition.
Glastry	United Kingdom	The brig collided with the barque Enos Seule (United States) 25 nautical miles (46 km) off St. Catherine's Point, Isle of Wight and was abandoned by the seven people on board. Five were rescued by Enos Seule, and two by Hippolyte et Marie' (France)' Glastry was on a voyage from Cork to Newcastle upon Tyne, Northumberland. She was towed in to Portsmouth, Hampshire by the brig Maggie (United Kingdom).
San Foriano	Italy	The schooner was abandoned in the South Atlantic. Her crew were rescued by Vanguard (United Kingdom).
Wigoline	United Kingdom	The ship foundered in the North Sea off Flamborough Head, Yorkshire. Her crew were rescued by the fishing smack Hero (United Kingdom). Wigoline was on a voyage from South Shields to Trouville-sur-Mer, Calvados, France.

== 4 June ==
List of shipwrecks: 4 June 1875
Ship	State	Description
Andrea	Norway	The schooner ran aground and was severely damaged at Macduff, Aberdeenshire, United Kingdom. She was on a voyage from Brevig to Macduff.
Julia	New Zealand	The 16-ton cutter was driven onto a reef near Kawau Island in New Zealand's Hauraki Gulf by a gale and was wrecked.
Lizzie	United Kingdom	The sloop collided with the railway bridge at Skelton, Yorkshire, capsized and sank in the River Ouse. Her crew were rescued. She was on a voyage from Hull to Howdendyke.
Mary Moore	United Kingdom	The brig was driven ashore near Southend, Essex. She was on a voyage from London to the West Indies.
Steinmann	Belgium	The steamship was driven ashore and damaged at Blackgang Chine, Isle of Wight, United Kingdom. She was on a voyage from New York, United States to Antwerp. She was refloated and resumed her voyage.
St. Marie	France	The lugger ran aground and sank in the Farne Islands, Northumberland, United Kingdom. Her crew survived.
Thorbecke	Netherlands	The schooner was wrecked in the Rio Grande. She was on a voyage from the Rio Grande to a Dutch port.

== 5 June ==
List of shipwrecks: 5 June 1875
Ship	State	Description
Elibanks Castle	Flag unknown	The schooner was driven ashore at Timaru, New Zealand. She was refloated.
Fosterlandet	Sweden	The ship collided with the steamship Sodra Sveridge (Sweden at Landskrona and was holed below the waterline. She was assisted in to Landskrona having restowed her cargo and with the assistance of two steamships. She was on a voyage from St. Ubes, Portugal to a Swedish port.
Niagara	United Kingdom	The paddle steamer was driven ashore and wrecked 2 nautical miles (3.7 km) south of the South Stack, Anglesey. Her crew were rescued. She was on a voyage from New York, United States to Liverpool, Lancashire.
Success	Flag unknown	The 59-ton schooner was one driven ashore and wrecked at Timaru with the loss of all four crew.
Wild Wave	Flag unknown	The schooner was driven ashore at Timaru, New Zealand. She was refloated.
William and Mary	New Zealand	The 47-ton schooner capsized during a gale to the north of Kapiti Island. All but one of the ship's crew of five men drowned.

== 6 June ==
List of shipwrecks: 6 June 1875
Ship	State	Description
Cid	France	The steamship ran aground, broke in two and was wrecked at Havre de Grâce, Seine-Inférieure. She was on a voyage from Neath, Glamorgan, United Kingdom to Fécamp, Seine-Inférieure.
John Bunyan	United Kingdom	The ship was wrecked on the Aquada Reef and was wrecked. Her crew were rescued. She was on a voyage from Liverpool, Lancashire to Bassein, India.
Oriana	United Kingdom	The ship ran aground at Kertch, Russia. She was on a voyage from London to Kertch.

== 7 June ==
List of shipwrecks: 7 June 1875
Ship	State	Description
Belle of the Bay	United States	The Schooner was run down and sunk off Block Island by "City of Paris". Crew saved.
Erin	United Kingdom	The paddle steamer heeled over and sank at Belfast, County Antrim.
Lady of the Lake	United Kingdom	The ship was driven ashore at Elephant Point, Burma.
Niagara	United States	The ship was driven ashore at Liverpool, Lancashire, United Kingdom. She was on a voyage from New York to Liverpool.

== 8 June ==
List of shipwrecks: 8 June 1875
Ship	State	Description
Francis	France	The ship was abandoned in the Atlantic Ocean. Her 39 crew were rescued by the schooner Harstine (United Kingdom). Francis was on a voyage from Saint-Malo, Ille-et-Vilaine to the Newfoundland Colony.

== 9 June ==
List of shipwrecks: 9 June 1875
Ship	State	Description
Adelaide	United Kingdom	The ship ran aground in the Rangoon River. She was on a voyage from Liverpool, Lancashire to Rangoon, Burma. She was refloated and completed her voyage.
Alice Haske	United States	The ship ran aground off "Cape Cataline", Russia. She was on a voyage from San Francisco, California to Nicolaieff, Russia. She was condemned and sold, but was refloated and taken in to Nicolaieff, where she arrived on 28 July.
Queen of the Lakes	United Kingdom	The ship was driven ashore at Rangoon. She was on a voyage from Colombo, Ceylon to Rangoon.
Unnamed	Flag unknown	The schooner ran aground on the West Hoyle Bank, in Liverpool Bay.

== 10 June ==
List of shipwrecks: 10 June 1875
Ship	State	Description
Forward	United States	The ship ran aground in the Swash, off Portland, Oregon. She was on a voyage from Hong Kong to Portland.
Jennie Prince	United Kingdom	The brig ran aground on the English Bank, in the River Plate and was wrecked. She was on a voyage from Cardiff, Glamorgan to Montevideo, Uruguay.
Linn Fern	United Kingdom	The schooner ran aground on Texel, North Holland, Netherlands. She was on a voyage from the west coast of Africa to Hamburg, Germany. She was refloated with assistance from a pilot boat.
Southport	United Kingdom	The paddle steamer was wrecked at Malpica de Bergantiños, Spain with the loss of all but two of her crew. She was on a voyage from Bristol, Gloucestershire to Sicily, Italy.
Union	Germany	The ship ran aground off Dagerort, Russia. She was on a voyage from Lübeck to Saint Petersburg. Russia.
Unnamed	Ottoman Empire	The brig was run down and sunk off Seraglio Point by the steamship Rhondda (United Kingdom).

== 11 June ==
List of shipwrecks: 11 June 1875
Ship	State	Description
Bloomingdale	United States	The Schooner was lost on Woody Island, Newfoundland. Crew was saved.
Eliza	United Kingdom	The schooner ran aground in the Scheldt at Hellevoetsluis, Zeeland, Netherlands. She was on a voyage from London to Dordrecht, South Holland, Netherlands. She was refloated and completed her voyage.

== 12 June ==
List of shipwrecks: 12 June 1875
Ship	State	Description
Kedar	United Kingdom	The steamship was driven ashore at Gibraltar. She was on a voyage from Alexandria, Egypt to Liverpool, Lancashire. She was refloated. She was refloated and resumed her voyage.
Nova Scotia	United Kingdom	The ship ran aground. She was on a voyage from Quebec City to Liverpool. She was refloated.
Virgo	Canada	The ship was wrecked at Saint-Pierre, Saint Pierre and Miquelon. She was on a voyage from Halifax, Nova Scotia to Saint John's, Newfoundland Colony.

== 13 June ==
List of shipwrecks: 13 June 1875
Ship	State	Description
Geffrard	Victoria	The brig ran aground on a sandbank after the anchor chain parted off Quindalup, Western Australia.
Unity	United Kingdom	The brig was driven ashore at Helsingborg, Sweden. She was on a voyage from Aarhus, Denmark to Hamina, Grand Duchy of Finland. She was refloated and taken in to Helsingør, Denmark.
Viatka	Russia	The ship was driven ashore at Ostby, Öland, Sweden. She was on a voyage from Saint Petersburg to London, United Kingdom. She was refloated and taken in to Copenhagen, Denmark.

== 14 June ==
List of shipwrecks: 14 June 1875
Ship	State	Description
Adona	Norway	The ship was driven ashore and wrecked on Sejerø, Denmark. She was on a voyage from Sunderland, County Durham, United Kingdom to Lübeck, Germany.
Culzean	United Kingdom	The full-rigged ship ran aground at Belfast, County Antrim.
Elida	Norway	The ship ran aground ran aground on the Salvo Reef, in the Baltic Sea. She was on a voyage from Umeå, Sweden to London, United Kingdom. She was refloated and taken in to Fårösund, Sweden in a waterlogged condition.
Jane Ellen	United Kingdom	The schooner was driven ashore at Moville, County Donegal. She was on a voyage from Londonderry to Red Bay.
Nordlyset	Sweden	The ship ran aground at Dragør, Denmark. She was on a voyage from Sunderland, County Durham, United Kingdom to Norrköping.
Otto	Netherlands	The schooner ran aground at Dragør. She was on a voyage from Liverpool, Lancashire, United Kingdom to Saint Petersburg, Russia. She was refloated.
Prinz Adalbert	Germany	The barque ran aground off Cape Arkona.

== 15 June ==
List of shipwrecks: 15 June 1875
Ship	State	Description
Athelstane	United Kingdom	The steamship ran aground at Falmouth, Cornwall. She was refloated.
Fanny	United Kingdom	The ship, a schooner or a ketch, foundered in the Bristol Channel off Clevedon, Somerset with the loss of all four or five crew.
George H. Warren	United Kingdom	The ship ran aground at New York, United States. She was on a voyage from Boston, Massachusetts, United States to Saint John, New Brunswick, Canada.
Ottolina	Norway	The ship ran aground on Bendeser. She was on a voyage from Norway to Quebec City, Canada. She was refloated and resumed her voyage.
Result	United Kingdom	The brigantine was run down and sunk in the River Thames by Trevelyan (United Kingdom). She was refloated on 18 June and beached at East Greenwich, Kent.
Viatka	Russia	The ship ran aground off Öland, Sweden. She was on a voyage from Saint Petersburg to London, United Kingdom. She was refloated and put in to Copenhagen, Denmark in a leaky condition.

== 16 June ==
List of shipwrecks: 16 June 1875
Ship	State	Description
Alexandre	United Kingdom	The ship ran aground at Lisbon, Portugal. She was refloated and found to be leaky.
Bartolomeo Danovaro	Italy	The barque ran aground at Dunkirk, Nord, France. She was refloated with the assistance of a tug.
Chrysolite	United Kingdom	The ship was driven ashore on the Ards Peninsula, County Down. She was on a voyage from Glasgow, Renfrewshire to Ballysadare, County Sligo.
Deborah	United Kingdom	The ship foundered in the North Sea off Happisburgh, Norfolk. Her crew were rescued by the smack Serjeant Ballantine (United Kingdom). Deborah was on a voyage from Hull, Yorkshire to Pont-Audemer, Eure, France.
Hermann	Germany	The barque ran aground on the Middle Shoebury Sand, in the Thames Estuary.
Olga Maria	Russia	The steamship ran aground at Dragør, Denmark.
Prairie Bird	United Kingdom	The ship caught fire and put in to Key West, Florida, United States. She was on a voyage from New Orleans, Louisiana, United States to Liverpool, Lancashire.
Rafaelo	Italy	The brig ran aground in the Scheldt. She was refloated and towed in to Hellevoetsluis, Zeeland, Netherlands. She was refloated with the assistance of tugs.

== 17 June ==
List of shipwrecks: 17 June 1875
Ship	State	Description
Bide	United Kingdom	The steamship struck the quayside at Dundee, Forfarshire and was damaged.
Esk	United Kingdom	The barque departed from Valparaíso, Chile for Havre de Grâce, Seine-Inférieure, France. No further trace, presumed foundered with the loss of all fifteen crew.
Nicoline	Italy	The ship ran aground at Aberdeen, United Kingdom and was severely damaged. She was on a voyage from Baltimore, Maryland, United States to Aberdeen.
Susan	United Kingdom	The steamship was driven ashore and sank at Ceuta, Spain. Her 22 crew were rescued.
Unnamed	Flag unknown	The schooner ran aground in Liverpool Bay.

== 18 June ==
List of shipwrecks: 18 June 1875
Ship	State	Description
USS Saranac	United States Navy	The sloop-of-war was wrecked on the submerged Ripple Rock in Seymour Narrows off Campbell River, British Columbia, Canada. Her 173 crew survived.
Shields	United Kingdom	The brig ran aground on the Mahone Rock, in the Irish Sea off the coast of County Wexford and was abandoned by her crew, who were rescued by the Carnsore lifeboat. She was on a voyage from Cork to Troon, Ayrshire. She was refloated with assistance from the tug Ruby (United Kingdom) and towed in to Wexford.
Sultan	United Kingdom	The barque caught fire and was beached between Kingsdown and St. Margarets Bay, Kent. She was on a voyage from London to Le Tréport, Seine-Inférieure, France.

== 19 June ==
List of shipwrecks: 19 June 1875
Ship	State	Description
Assiz, and Spitfire	Germany; United Kingdom	The steamship Assiz and the tug Spitfire collided in the River Thames at Greenwich, Kent. Both vessels sank
Ayresome	United Kingdom	The steamship collided with some barges and was beached at Greenwich.
Brothers	United Kingdom	The brig ran aground and was damaged at Fraserburgh, Aberdeenshire. She was on a voyage from Liverpool, Lancashire to Fraserburgh. She was refloated.
Royal Family	United Kingdom	The ship ran aground on the Western Sands, off Rangoon, Burma. She was on a voyage from Bombay, India to Rangoon.
Sir Edward	United Kingdom	The schooner sprang a leak and foundered in the Irish Sea 7 nautical miles (13 km) south south west of Point Lynas, Anglesey. Her crew survived. She was on a voyage from Bangor, Caernarfonshire to Silloth, Cumberland.

== 20 June ==
List of shipwrecks: 20 June 1875
Ship	State	Description
Excelsior	France	The steamship was run down and sunk off "Suaglio Point", Ottoman Empire by the steamship Lumley Castle (United Kingdom). Excelsion was on a voyage from Marseille, Bouches-du-Rhône to Sulina, Ottoman Empire.
Marina Rocca	France	The ship was driven ashore at "Zulfa Point" and was severely damaged. She was on a voyage from Guadeloupe to Marseille.
Sutterworth	United Kingdom	The ship was damaged by fire east of the Cape of Good Hope, Cape Colony with the loss of one life. She was on a voyage from the British Isles to Auckland, New Zealand.

== 21 June ==
List of shipwrecks: 21 June 1875
Ship	State	Description
Emerald	United States	The ship caught fire at Honolulu, Kingdom of Hawaii and was scuttled to save hull; later raised and sold in December 1875.

== 23 June ==
List of shipwrecks: 23 June 1875
Ship	State	Description
Japan	United Kingdom	The steamship ran aground at Hong Kong. She was refloated and taken in to Hong Kong in a severely leaky condition. She was placed under repair.
Theodore	Belgium	The ship sprang a leak and foundered in the North Sea off Flamborough Head, Yorkshire. Her crew were rescued by the smack Catherine (United Kingdom). Theodore was on a voyage from Scarborough, Yorkshire to Ostend, West Flanders.

== 24 June ==
List of shipwrecks: 24 June 1875
Ship	State	Description
Caroline Phillips	United Kingdom	The schooner was wrecked on the Mixon Shoal, in the Bristol Channel with the loss of all four crew.
Delaney	(Dominion of Newfoundland) Newfoundland Colony	The schooner struck an iceberg and sank. All 82 people on board got on to the iceberg, from where they were rescued the next day by Jane Ainsley ( (Dominion of Newfoundland) Newfoundland Colony.
La Maria	France	The brig sank at La Rochelle, Charente-Inférieure.
T. C. N.	United Kingdom	The fishing smack was run down and sunk in the English Channel off Start Point, Devon by the barque John Ellis ( Canada).

== 25 June ==
List of shipwrecks: 25 June 1875
Ship	State	Description
Cybele	United Kingdom	The steamship ran aground at Singapore, Straits Settlements. She was on a voyage from London to Shanghai, China. She was refloated in early July and taken in to Singapore for repairs.
Eleonora	United Kingdom	The barque was driven ashore at "Solmelunge". She was on a voyage from Sundsvall, Sweden to Newcastle upon Tyne, Northumberland.

== 26 June ==
List of shipwrecks: 26 June 1875
Ship	State	Description
Aride	United Kingdom	The smack foundered in the North Sea 5 nautical miles (9.3 km) off Chapel St. Leonards, Lincolnshire. Her crew were rescued.
Bertha	United Kingdom	The barque collided with the steamship Achilles and sank in the River Thames at Gravesend, Kent. Her crew were rescued. She was refloated on 21 July and beached at Limehouse, Middlesex.
Ruth	Austria-Hungary	The ran aground at Cardiff, Glamorgan, United Kingdom. She was on a voyage from Cardiff to Kertch, Russia. She was refloated.

== 27 June ==
List of shipwrecks: 27 June 1875
Ship	State	Description
Amarant	Norway	The barque was driven ashore at Agger, Denmark. Her crew were rescued. she was on a voyage from Hull, Yorkshire, United Kingdom to Malmö, Sweden.

== 28 June ==
List of shipwrecks: 28 June 1875
Ship	State	Description
Else	Denmark	The ship sank in the Lumfjord near Aalborg. She was on a voyage from Grangemouth, Stirlingshire, United Kingdom to Nyköping.
Esperance	Flag unknown	The ship ran aground on the Banco Ortez, in the River Plate. She was on a voyage from Valparaíso, Chile to Buenos Aires, Argentina.
Geffard	New South Wales	The brig was wrecked in Geographe Bay.
Marius Henriette	Netherlands	The steamship ran aground on the wreck of Bertha (United Kingdom) in the River Thames at Gravesend, Kent, United Kingdom. She was on a voyage from Dordrecht, South Holland to London. She was refloated with the assistance of a tug and taken in to Gravesend.
Orion	United Kingdom	The ship was driven ashore at Lepe, Hampshire. She was on a voyage from Rouen, Seine-Inférieure, France to Plymouth, Devon.
Probité	France	The schooner was wrecked near Ouessant, Finistère, France. She was on a voyage from Redon, Ille-et-Vilaine to Cardiff, Glamorgan, United Kingdom.

== 29 June ==
List of shipwrecks: 29 June 1875
Ship	State	Description
Culzean Castle	United Kingdom	The ship was sighted whilst on a voyage from Liverpool, Lancashire to Melbourne, Victoria. No further trace, presumed foundered with the loss of all hands.
St. Rollox	United Kingdom	The ship was driven ashore at Smeily Point, Argyllshire. She was on a voyage from Glasgow, Renfrewshire to Jura. She was refloated and beached at Campbeltown, Argyllshire.
Willie McLaren	United Kingdom	The ship ran aground and was damaged at Liverpool. She was on a voyage from Prince Edward Island, Canada to Bristol, Gloucestershire.

== 30 June ==
List of shipwrecks: 30 June 1875
Ship	State	Description
Ann	United Kingdom	The Mersey Flat caught fire at Liverpool, Lancashire.
Coromandel	United Kingdom	The steamship departed from Bombay, India for Liverpool. No further trace, presumed foundered with the loss of 40 people on board.

== Unknown date ==
List of shipwrecks: Unknown date in June 1875
Ship	State	Description
Anna	United Kingdom	The ship ran aground off Lavansaari, Grand Duchy of Finland. She was refloated and towed in to Vyborg, Grand Duchy of Finland.
Champlain	United States	The ship ran aground in the Farallon Islands, California and sank. She was on a voyage from New York to San Francisco, California.
Earl of Elgin	United Kingdom	The ship was driven ashore at Cap-Chat, Quebec, Canada. She was on a voyage from Greenock, Renfrewshire to Quebec City, Canada. She was refloated on 18 June.
Eden	United Kingdom	The barque was wrecked in a hurricane at Valparaíso, Chile.
Egeria	Chile	The launch was wrecked in a hurricane at Valparaíso.
Eleanora	United Kingdom	The ship was driven ashore. She was on a voyage from Sundsvall, Sweden to Newcastle upon Tyne, Northumberland. She was refloated and taken in to Copenhagen, Denmark.
Holgate	Norway	The barque was abandoned in the Atlantic Ocean before 15 June.
Ismay	United Kingdom	The barque was wrecked at "Punta de Choros", Chile before 8 June. Her crew were rescued. She was on a voyage from Valparaíso to Peñablanca, Chile.
Monadnock	United States	The Schooner was lost in the Magdalen Islands. crew saved.
Ocean	Chile	The launch was wrecked in a hurricane at Valparaíso.
Pacific	New Zealand	The 51-ton schooner left Timaru bound for Manukau Harbour, Auckland on 4 June with eight crew and one passenger. She was not seen again.
Presidente Sarmiento	Argentina	The ship ran aground on the Banco Chico. She was on a voyage from Magdalena to the English Channel. She was refloated and resumed her voyage.
Pearl	Chile	The launch was wrecked in a hurricane at Valparaíso.
Rangatira	New South Wales	The steamship was wrecked on the coast of New Caledonia before 25 June. Her crew were rescued.
Redby	United Kingdom	The brig was driven ashore near Thisted, Denmark. She was on a voyage from Burntisland, Fife to Copenhagen, Denmark. She was refloated and taken in to Halmstad, Sweden in a severely leaky condition.
Regina	Norway	The brig ran aground at Arkhangelsk, Russia. She was condemned.
Rogate	United Kingdom	The barque was abandoned in the Atlantic Ocean before 16 June.
Tonga	United Kingdom	The ship was wrecked on the coast of the Natal Colony. Her crew were rescued. She was on a voyage from London to the Natal Colony.
Trujillo	Chile	The brig was wrecked in a hurricane at Valparaíso.
Unnamed	Flag unknown	The schooner collided with Tolvo (Norway) and foundered on the Grand Banks of Newfoundland with the loss of all hands.
