= List of shipwrecks in 1871 =

The list of shipwrecks in 1871 includes ships sunk, foundered, grounded, or otherwise lost during 1871.

table of contents
← 1870 / 1871 / 1872 →
Jan	Feb	Mar	Apr
May	Jun	Jul	Aug
Sep	Oct	Nov	Dec
Unknown date

== Unknown date ==
List of shipwrecks: Unknown date in 1871
Ship	State	Description
Alibi	United Kingdom	The sealer, a barque, was lost off the coast of Greenland with the loss of all hands, more than 30 lives.
America	Uruguay	The steamship suffered a catastrophic fire due to an overheated boiler off the coast of Punta Espinillo, outside the harbor of Montevideo. One of the survivors was Ramón Artagaveytia.
Andromeda	United Kingdom	The ship was lost in the South China Sea before 15 March.
Aries	Flag unknown	The steamer was lost at Cranberry Inlet on the coast of New Jersey.
Avondale	New Zealand	The steamship was wrecked near Taranaki. All on a board were rescued.
Barwon	New South Wales	The steamship struck rocks off Cape Bridgewater, Victoria and was beached near Cape Nelson. She was on a voyage from Adelaide, South Australia to Sydney.
Borston	Flag unknown	The steamship struck an iceberg and foundered with the loss of all hands, according to a message in a bottle washed up at Den Helder, North Holland, Netherlands on 10 October.
Catherine	New South Wales	The barque was wrecked 5 nautical miles (9.3 km) south of Newcastle. She was on a voyage from Newcastle to Melbourne, Victoria.
Catherine Jackson	Flag unknown	The vessel was lost in the vicinity of "Squan," a term used at the time for the coast of New Jersey near Manasquan and sometimes for the 7-mile (11 km) stretch of coast between Manasquan Inlet and Cranberry Inlet or for the entire coast of New Jersey between Sea Girt and Barnegat Inlet.
HMS Clio	Royal Navy	The Pearl-class corvette struck a rock in Bligh Sound and was beached.
Como	United Kingdom	The ship foundered between 9 February and 16 March. Her crew were rescued. She was on a voyage from Cardiff, Glamorgan to New York, United States.
Estrella	United Kingdom	The barque was wrecked at the mouth of the Brass River with the loss of a crew member after 8 August. She was on a voyage from Liverpool, Lancashire to the Brass River.
Golden Age	New South Wales	The ship was wrecked on Barren Island, Tasmania. She was on a voyage from Newcastle to Melbourne.
Heinan Maru	Japan	The steamship foundered in the Inland Sea of Japan.
Kanrin Maru	Imperial Japanese Navy	The screw corvette was wrecked in a typhoon at Esashi, Hokkaido, Japan.
Lady Young	Queensland	The steamship was driven ashore and severely damaged near Port Stephens, New South Wales.
Nadir Shah	Sultanate of Zanzibar	The ship was lost.
O. H. Canady	Flag unknown	The schooner was lost in the vicinity of "Squan Beach," a term used at the time for the coast of New Jersey near Manasquan and sometimes for the 7-mile (11 km) stretch of coast between Manasquan Inlet and Cranberry Inlet or for the entire coast of New Jersey between Sea Girt and Barnegat Inlet.
Oneida	Flag unknown	The schooner was lost in the vicinity of "Squan Beach," a term used at the time for the coast of New Jersey near Manasquan and sometimes for the 7-mile (11 km) stretch of coast between Manasquan Inlet and Cranberry Inlet or for the entire coast of New Jersey between Sea Girt and Barnegat Inlet.
Porcia	United States	The vessel was lost in the Arctic on or near the north coast of the Department of Alaska.
Rialto	New South Wales	The barque was wrecked at Newcastle.
Rifleman	New Zealand	The schooner was wrecked at Auckland.
Rising Sun	United Kingdom	The ship sank in Osaka Bay.
San Juan	Peru	The ship was destroyed by fire with the loss of more than 600 coolies. There were about 50 survivors. She was on a voyage from Macao, China to Callao, Peru.
Tartar	United Kingdom	The ship was lost near Fuzhou, China in September or October.
Victoria	Sultanate of Zanzibar	The frigate was lost.
Villotine	Flag unknown	The barque was lost in the vicinity of "Squan Beach," a term used at the time for the coast of New Jersey near Manasquan and sometimes for the 7-mile (11 km) stretch of coast between Manasquan Inlet and Cranberry Inlet or for the entire coast of New Jersey between Sea Girt and Barnegat Inlet.
Wolf	United Kingdom	The sealer, a steamship, was sunk by ice off the coast of the Newfoundland Colony. Her crew were rescued.
Unnamed	China	A junk was run down and sunk at Amoy by HMS Ocean (Royal Navy).
