= List of shipwrecks in 1870 =

The list of shipwrecks in 1870 includes ships sunk, foundered, grounded, or otherwise lost during 1870.

table of contents
← 1869 / 1870 / 1871 →
Jan	Feb	Mar	Apr
May	Jun	Jul	Aug
Sep	Oct	Nov	Dec
Unknown date

== Unknown date ==
List of shipwrecks: unknown date 1870
Ship	State	Description
Alarm	Newfoundland Colony	The sealer was sunk by ice.
Alice	New South Wales	The brigantine was driven ashore.
Aurora	New Zealand	The schooner was driven ashore at Timaru.
B. C. Schriviner	Unknown	The schooner was lost in the vicinity of "Squan Beach," a term used at the time for the coast of New Jersey near Manasquan and sometimes for the 7-mile (11 km) stretch of coast between Manasquan Inlet and Cranberry Inlet or for the entire coast of New Jersey between Sea Girt and Barnegat Inlet.
Betsy	New Zealand	The cutter left Napier bound for Auckland and was never seen again.
Cessina	New South Wales	The ship was wrecked on Flinders Island, Tasmania. She was on a voyage from Newcastle to Adelaide, South Australia.
Challenger	United Kingdom	The brig collided with the steamship Avoca (South Australia and sank in Port Phillip Bay.
Charles Edward	New Zealand	The steamship struck a rock near Hokitika and sank.
Clarissa	United Kingdom	The ship was wrecked at Tahiti.
Colonist	New South Wales	The ship ran aground on the Elizabeth Reef. She was on a voyage from Sydney to New Caledonia.
Countess of Sheffield	United Kingdom	The ship was lost in the Torres Strait.
Dolphin	United Kingdom	The brig was abandoned in the Atlantic Ocean off the Canary Islands with loss of life. Five survivors took to the jolly boat, according to a message in a bottle that washed up at Southport, Lancashire on 23 March.
Edward Edgar	United Kingdom	The ship foundered off Valentia Island, County Cork according to a message in a bottle that washed up at Ilfracombe, Devon in September.
Eli Whitney	United States	The ship was wrecked on Tahiti. She was on a voyage from Newcastle, New South Wales to San Francisco, California.
Gilman D. King	Unknown	The schooner was lost in the vicinity of "Squan Beach," a term used at the time for the coast of New Jersey near Manasquan and sometimes for the 7-mile (11 km) stretch of coast between Manasquan Inlet and Cranberry Inlet or for the entire coast of New Jersey between Sea Girt and Barnegat Inlet.
Highlander	United Kingdom	The ship was wrecked near Newcastle, New South Wales.
Il'mena	Imperial Russian Navy	The ship sank. She was refloated by means of air bags.
Jane	New Zealand	The schooner was lost whilst on a voyage from the Bay of Islands to Thames.
Jeanie Oswald	South Australia	The ship ran aground in the Fitzroy River. She was on a voyage from Adelaide to Rockhampton, Queensland. She was consequently condemned.
John Collins	Unknown	The schooner was lost in the vicinity of "Squan Beach," a term used at the time for the coast of New Jersey near Manasquan and sometimes for the 7-mile (11 km) stretch of coast between Manasquan Inlet and Cranberry Inlet or for the entire coast of New Jersey between Sea Girt and Barnegat Inlet.
Lagos	United Kingdom	The sailing barge was abandoned in the Atlantic Ocean after 31 August. She was on a voyage from Liverpool, Lancashire to Lagos, Africa.
Layard	United Kingdom	The brig was wrecked at Timaru.
Leon	United Kingdom	The ship caught fire in Chichora Bay and was scuttled. She was on a voyage from Cardiff, Glamorgan to Valparaíso, Chile.
Lizzie Lane	Unknown	The sloop was lost in the vicinity of "Squan Beach," a term used at the time for the coast of New Jersey near Manasquan and sometimes for the 7-mile (11 km) stretch of coast between Manasquan Inlet and Cranberry Inlet or for the entire coast of New Jersey between Sea Girt and Barnegat Inlet.
Mary	United Kingdom	The ship was abandoned at sea. She was on a voyage from Callao, Peru to Queenstown, County Cork.
Metch	Imperial Russian Navy	The gunboat sank at Tranzund, Grand Duchy of Finland. She was refloated by means of air bags.
Myrtle	United States	The schooner was wrecked in the Aleutian Islands late in 1870.
Othello	Newfoundland Colony	The sealer was sunk by ice.
Pocumtuck	United States	The fishing schooner was run ashore near Ship Harbor, Nova Scotia. Condemned and sold.
Scudd	Unknown	The schooner was lost in the vicinity of "Squan Beach," a term used at the time for the coast of New Jersey near Manasquan and sometimes for the 7-mile (11 km) stretch of coast between Manasquan Inlet and Cranberry Inlet or for the entire coast of New Jersey between Sea Girt and Barnegat Inlet.
Star of the East	New Zealand	The steamship was lost near Napier.
Stormbird	New South Wales	The schooner was abandoned off Green Cape.
Summer Cloud	New South Wales	The ship was wrecked in Wreck Bay. Her crew were rescued. She was on a voyage from Melbourne, Victoria to Newcastle.
United Brothers	Newfoundland Colony	The sealer was sunk by ice.
