= List of shipwrecks in 1869 =

The list of shipwrecks in 1869 includes ships sunk, foundered, grounded, or otherwise lost during 1869.

table of contents
← 1868 / 1869 / 1870 →
Jan	Feb	Mar	Apr
May	Jun	Jul	Aug
Sep	Oct	Nov	Dec
Unknown date

== Unknown date ==
List of shipwrecks: Unknown date in 1869
Ship	State	Description
A. S. Ruthven	United States	The screw steamer was lost during 1869.
Ann	United Kingdom	The ship was abandoned in the South Atlantic before 2 November. She was on a voyage from "Burbosand" to London.
Ann Corbett	Unknown	The schooner was lost in the vicinity of "Squan Beach," a term used at the time for the coast of New Jersey near Manasquan and sometimes for the 7-mile (11 km) stretch of coast between Manasquan Inlet and Cranberry Inlet or for the entire coast of New Jersey between Sea Girt and Barnegat Inlet.
Avonmore	United Kingdom	Anchored off Sharp's Nose in the parish of Morwenstow, Cornwall, England, where the captain ordered the three masts to be cut down. She drifted on to the rocks below Hawker's Hut, close to Higher Sharpnose Point. Seven out of twenty-two crew died. She was en route from Cardiff to Montevideo with coal.
Early Morn	United Kingdom	The ship departed from Dundee, Forfarshire for Singapore, Straits Settlements. No further trace, presumed foundered with the loss of all hands.
Elizabeth	Newfoundland Colony	The sealer was sunk by ice off the coast of Labrador.
Emerald	Newfoundland Colony	The sealer was sunk by ice off the coast of Labrador.
Falstaff	France	The brig ran aground off the coast of Africa She was on a voyage from Old Calabar to Liverpool, Lancashire, United Kingdom. She was refloated a month later.
Glendower	United Kingdom	The ship foundered between 14 April and 17 June. Her crew were rescued. She was on a voyage from Bassein, India to a British port.
Ines	United Kingdom	The ship was wrecked at Carrizal Bajo, Chile. She was on a voyage from Carrizal Bajo to Swansea, Glamorgan.
Italian	United Kingdom	The cargo ship ran aground and was wrecked at Cape Finisterre, Spain.
Jabez Howes	United States	The sloop was lost sometime prior to 10 July 1869 in the waters of the Department of Alaska at a location identified as the "Black Fox Islands" – possibly a reference to the Fox Islands group in the eastern Aleutian Islands.
Miss Preston	United Kingdom	The barque was wrecked in the Sunda Strait between 17 February and 4 July. She was on her maiden voyage, from Sunderland, County Durham to Singapore.
M. M. Merriman	Unknown	The schooner was lost in the vicinity of "Squan Beach," a term used at the time for the coast of New Jersey near Manasquan and sometimes for the 7-mile (11 km) stretch of coast between Manasquan Inlet and Cranberry Inlet or for the entire coast of New Jersey between Sea Girt and Barnegat Inlet.
Packet	Newfoundland Colony	The sealer was wrecked at Twillingate.
Peruvia	United States	The ship was wrecked on "Vries Island", Japan.
Primrose Bank	Newfoundland Colony	The sealer was sunk by ice off the coast of Labrador.
Propontis	United Kingdom	The steamship was severely damaged by an onboard explosion in the Bay of Biscay between 29 July and 4 August. She was on a voyage from Cardiff, Glamorgan to Constantinople, Ottoman Empire. she put back to the River Mersey.
R. C. Waldron	Unknown	The schooner was lost in the vicinity of "Squan Beach," a term used at the time for the coast of New Jersey near Manasquan and sometimes for the 7-mile (11 km) stretch of coast between Manasquan Inlet and Cranberry Inlet or for the entire coast of New Jersey between Sea Girt and Barnegat Inlet.
Selah Hutton	Newfoundland Colony	The sealer, a brigantine, was wrecked on the coast of Labrador.
Volunteer	Newfoundland Colony	The sealer, a brig, was wrecked on the coast of Labrador.
