= Jacob Strader (steamboat) =

19th-century Ohio River packet

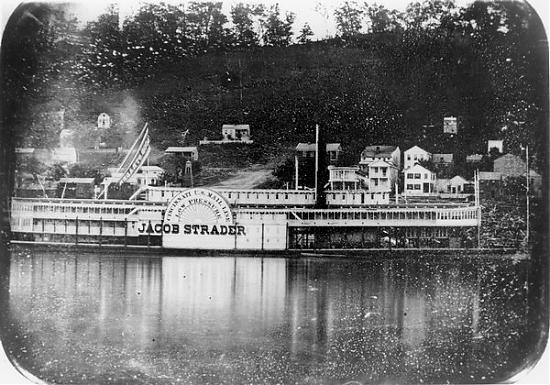
Jacob Strader on the Ohio 1853

The Jacob Strader was a side wheel packet steamboat built in Cincinnati, Ohio in 1853. She was owned by the U.S. Mail Line of Cincinnati. She provided the ultimate in luxurious travel between Cincinnati and Louisville up to the time of the Civil War. She was described by Thomas Nichols, a writer and traveler of that time, as "the finest boat, all things considered, that I ever saw on the American waters."

The Ohio River stretching from the Monongahela River and Allegheny River at their headwaters in Pittsburgh, Pennsylvania to its terminus where it joins the Mississippi River created a network of mid-19th century commerce which aided in opening up new lands in an expanding nation. Serving these rivers was a network of commercial and private flatboats and riverboats like the Jacob Strader, which moved goods and services throughout the middle part of the country. The Strader Steamboat Company operated 23 riverboats in these waters based at Strader Wharf, located at the foot of Vine Street in Cincinnati. During the Civil War, the Jacob Strader side wheel packet was used to transport sick and wounded soldiers. The Jacob Strader was dismantled in Madison, Indiana in 1866.

Captain Jacob Strader (August 5, 1795 – August 28, 1860), after whom the steamboat was named, was a prominent businessman in Cincinnati as well as a partner in the U.S. Mail Line. His enterprises included banking as well as the Little Miami Railroad and the Xenia Railroad companies. Jacob Strader died in 1860. He is entombed in a notable Gothic style brownstone mausoleum at Spring Grove Cemetery.
