= List of shipwrecks in 1873 =

The list of shipwrecks in 1873 includes ships sunk, foundered, grounded, or otherwise lost during 1873.

table of contents
1873
Jan	Feb	Mar	Apr
May	Jun	Jul	Aug
Sep	Oct	Nov	Dec
Unknown date

== Unknown date ==
List of shipwrecks: Unknown date in 1873
Ship	State	Description
Alexander Oldham	United States	The sidewheel paddle steamer was lost during 1873.
Alsager	United Kingdom	The ship was scuttled by her crew. Three of them were taken to Auckland, New Zealand, for trial.
Arapiles	Spanish Navy	The ironclad ran aground off the coast of Venezuela. Subsequently refloated and taken to New York, United States for repairs.
Artigas	United Kingdom	The steamship was lost in January or February. All on board were rescued.
Blanche Thomas	United Kingdom	The ship struck the Blanche Rock and was wrecked. She was on a voyage from Antwerp, Belgium to Sydney, New South Wales.
Bridgetown	Flag unknown	The ship was driven ashore at Fremantle, Western Australia. She was refloated.
Claude Hamilton	New Zealand	The steamship was wrecked after 24 October. She was on a voyage from Wellington to Melbourne, Victoria.
Dlhiot	Flag unknown	The schooner was wrecked on Easter Island. Her crew were rescued.
Elizabeth Kimball	United States	The ship was wrecked on Norfolk Island.
Ellen Martin	United Kingdom	The schooner beached on Summerlease Point Cliffs, north Cornwall, while attempting to enter the harbour at Bude. Her crew was taken off by breeches buoy and the ship's figurehead was in the captain's garden for many years.
Emmilienne	France	The ship was driven ashore and severely damaged at Fremantle.
George S. Wright	United States	The steamship was wrecked on the coast of Oregon with the loss of all on board. She was on a voyage from Sitka, Department of Alaska to San Francisco, California.
Georgette	United Kingdom	The steamship was driven ashore and severely damaged at Fremantle. She was refloated.
Norman	United Kingdom	The barque was wrecked at Yantai, China with the loss of her captain. She was on a voyage from Nagasaki, Japan to Yanti.
Ocean Express	United Kingdom	The ship was abandoned off Cape Horn, Chile. Her crew were rescued.
Parame	France	The barque was driven ashore and wrecked. She was on a voyage from Manila, Spanish East Indies to Queensland.
Sirocco	United Kingdom	The clipper was lost at sea.
Spray	United Kingdom	The ship foundered. Two of her crew were rescued. She was on a voyage from Niuzhuang, China to Nagasaki.
Tecite	France	The ship was lost at Nouméa, New Caledonia. She was on a voyage from Bordeaux, Gironde to Nouméa.
William Thomas	United States	The ship was wrecked on Easter Island.
