= General Screw Steam Shipping Company =

- Industry: Transport
- Founded: 1848

The General Screw Steam Shipping Company was a British company established in 1848 by James Laming, who had for about 30 years owned sailing ships travelling between England and the Netherlands.

== History ==
In late 1849 the company began a service from Liverpool to Gibraltar, Malta and Constantinople, using its new iron screw steamer the 500 ton Bosphorus. The similarly sized ships Hellespont and Propontis joined the Bosphorus on the service as soon as they were completed.

In 1850 the company secured the contract to carry the monthly mail between Plymouth and Cape Town for £30,000 a year. The Bosphorus initiated the service in December 1850 and reached Cape Town after a 40-day voyage, 5 days more than the period specified in the contract.

Following this, orders were placed with C.J. Mare and Company at Leamouth, London (builders of the earlier vessels) for the new ships Queen of the South, Lady Jocelyn, Indiana, Calcutta, Mauritius and Hydaspes

In May 1852 an additional mail contract was secured, for the company to provide a monthly service between England and Madras and Calcutta, via Cape St. Vincent, Ascension Island, St. Helena, Cape Town, Mauritius and Ceylon.

The company also initiated a mail service between Cape Town and Durban, which had previously been either overland service which generally took about 3 weeks or carried by sailing ships. This service was undertaken by the Sir Robert Peel.

=== Australian service ===
The Australian Royal Mail Steam Navigation Company began a mail service between England and Australia in June 1852 which proved so unreliable that their contract was withdrawn in April 1853, whereupon the General Screw Company (which had already despatched two steamships to Australia earlier in the year) stepped in with a regular service. An article in the Sydney Morning Herald in February 1853 describes the somewhat "unpropitious" circumstances which marked the journey from London to Port Jackson of the third of the Australian Royal Mail Steam Navigation Company's steamships, the Melbourne. The journey, which took about 4 months overall, but with running time of only 65 days, and the specifications of this ship are described in some detail.

The General Screw Steam Shipping Company's new steamer, the 1800-ton Argo, sailed from Southampton on 8 May 1853 and reached Melbourne in 64 days, with one stop en route at Cape St. Vincent. She returned via Cape Horn and received considerable acclaim as the first steamer to circumnavigate the globe.

The company's Indian service had been a failure due to various causes, that included mechanical problems which caused steamers to break down, unexpected high costs and coal consumption, and disappointing passenger and cargo results. Therefore, the service was withdrawn, the last sailing taking place on 15 March 1854.

Despite securing a short-term mail contract, the Australian service was withdrawn as well, the Argo sailing from Southampton on 4 October 1854 on the last voyage. The company chartered its new and now superfluous ships Golden Fleece, Jason and The Prince to the government to carry troops to the Mediterranean.

=== American service ===
In March 1854 the Indiana inaugurated a new service for the company, from Le Havre and Southampton to New York under the management of Croskey and Company, agents for the American-owned Ocean Navigation Company which was then operating a monthly service between New York, Southampton and Le Havre. It was intended that Indiana and Mauritius should sail monthly between Le Havre, Southampton and New York, alternating with the American steamers to provide a combined weekly service from Southampton.

In July 1854, the company accepted a proposal by the government of Mauritius to operate a monthly service between Mauritius and Ceylon for £10,000 a year.

=== Crimean War ===
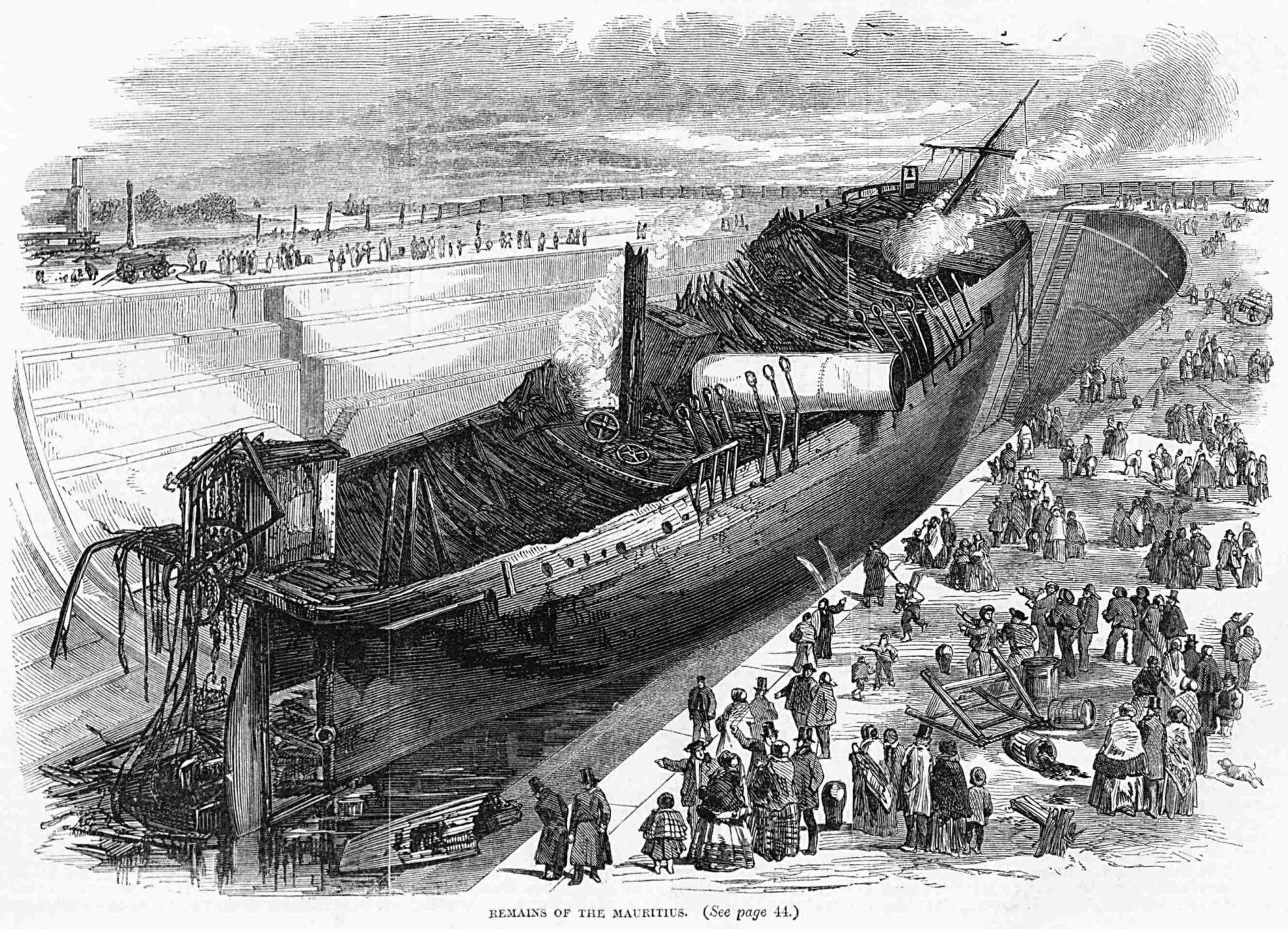
Remains of the Mauritius, in Southampton 1855, from the Pen and Pencil (newspaper)

All the company's ships were chartered as troop transports during the Crimean War from 1854 - 1855; three were lost to various causes. The Prince was destroyed during a hurricane in November 1854, the Mauritius was badly damaged due to fire while in drydock at Southampton in February 1855, and the Croesus was destroyed by fire in April of the same year.

Following the end of the war, the company sold its entire fleet to the European and American Steam Shipping Company in 1857.
