= Young America (clipper) =

1853 sailing ship built by William H. Webb

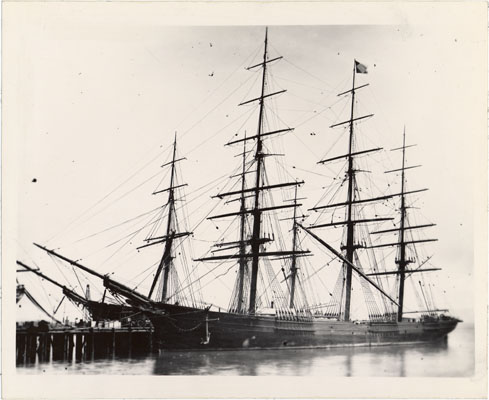
- Young America

History

United States
- Owner: George B. Daniels, New York
- Builder: William H. Webb, New York
- Cost: $140,000
- Launched: 1853

United States
- Owner: Abram Bell's Sons, 1860; Robert L. Taylor, c. 1865; George Howes & Co., New York and San Francisco, c. 1870; John Rosenfeld, San Francisco, 1880

Austria-Hungary
- Owner: Austman of Buccari, Austria
- Acquired: Purchased in New York for US $13,500 late in 1883.
- In service: Put into the trans-Atlantic case oil trade.
- Renamed: Miroslav
- Fate: Disappeared, 1886

General characteristics
- Class & type: Three-masted extreme clipper
- Tons burthen: 1439 tons (old measurement), 1380 (new measurement)
- Length: 243 ft.
- Beam: 43 ft. 2 in.
- Draft: 26 ft. 9 in.

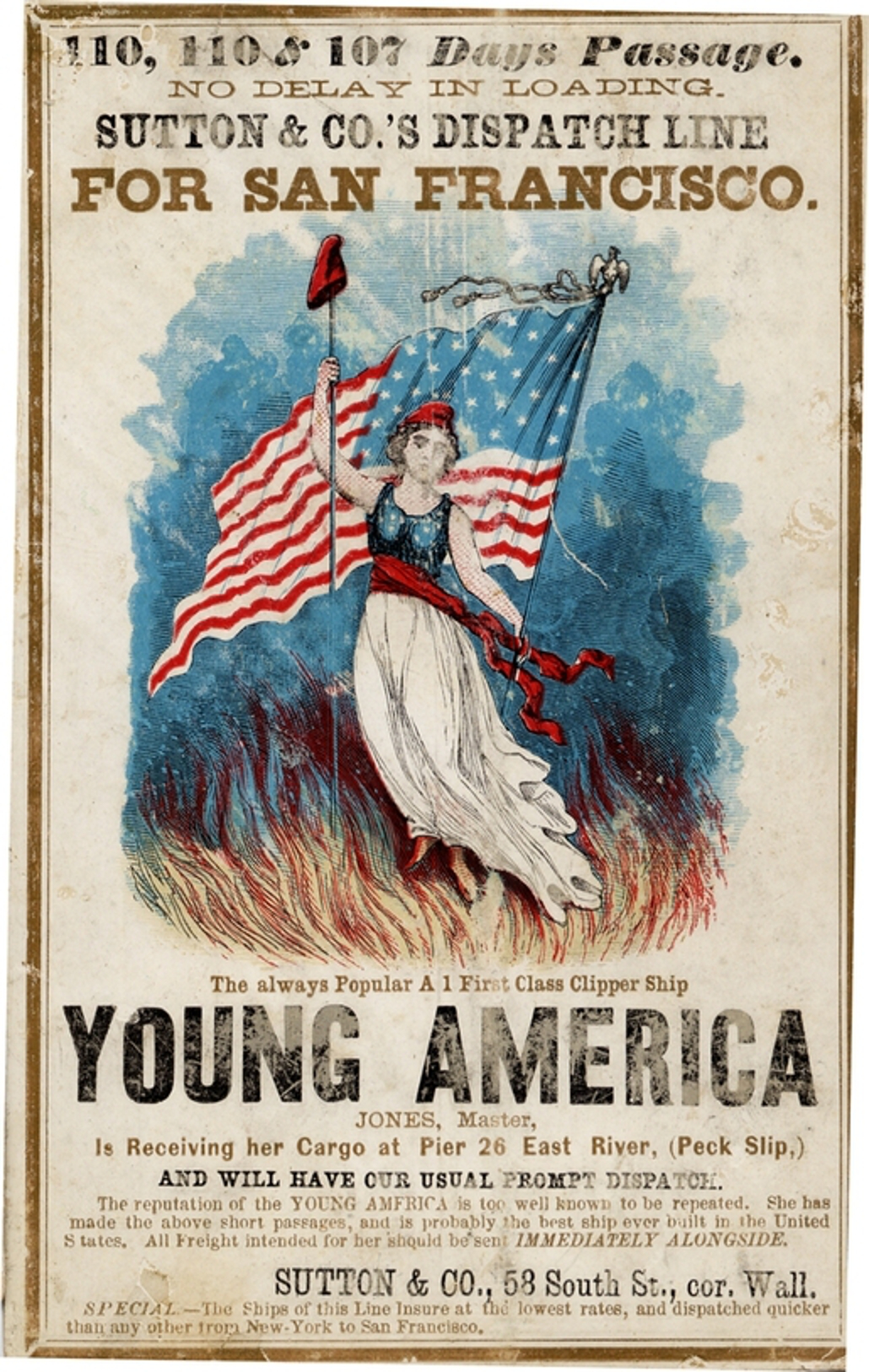

The Young America was built by William H. Webb of New York. She was launched in 1853, at the height of the clipper construction boom. She sailed in the California trade, on transatlantic routes, and made voyages to Australia and the Far East.

== Fast passages and records ==
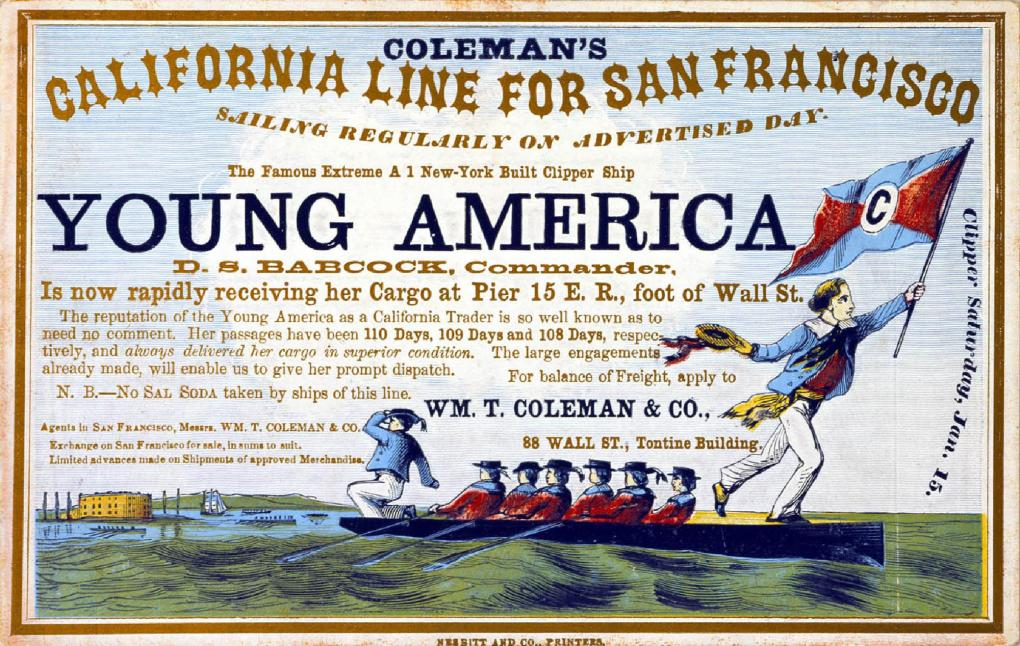

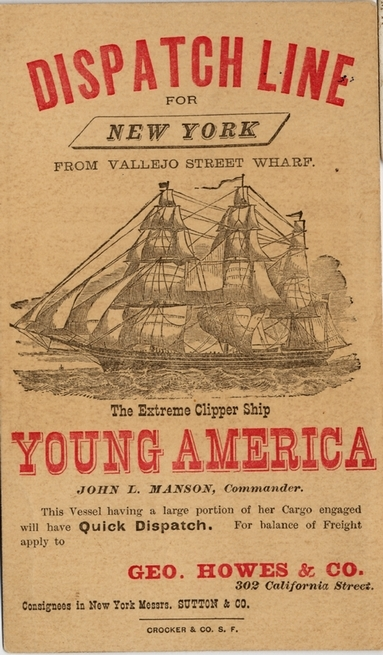

“Among her many fine passages may be mentioned: from New York to San Francisco, 103, 107, 110, 112, 117, and, 116 days, and from San Francisco to New York, 92, 97, 85, 101, 103, and 83 days; San Francisco to Liverpool, 103 and 106 days; Liverpool to San Francisco, 117, 111, and 99 days; and twenty consecutive passages from New York to San Francisco averaging 117 days. Her best performance, however, was from 50° S. in the Atlantic to 50° S. in the Pacific, in the record time of 6 days.”

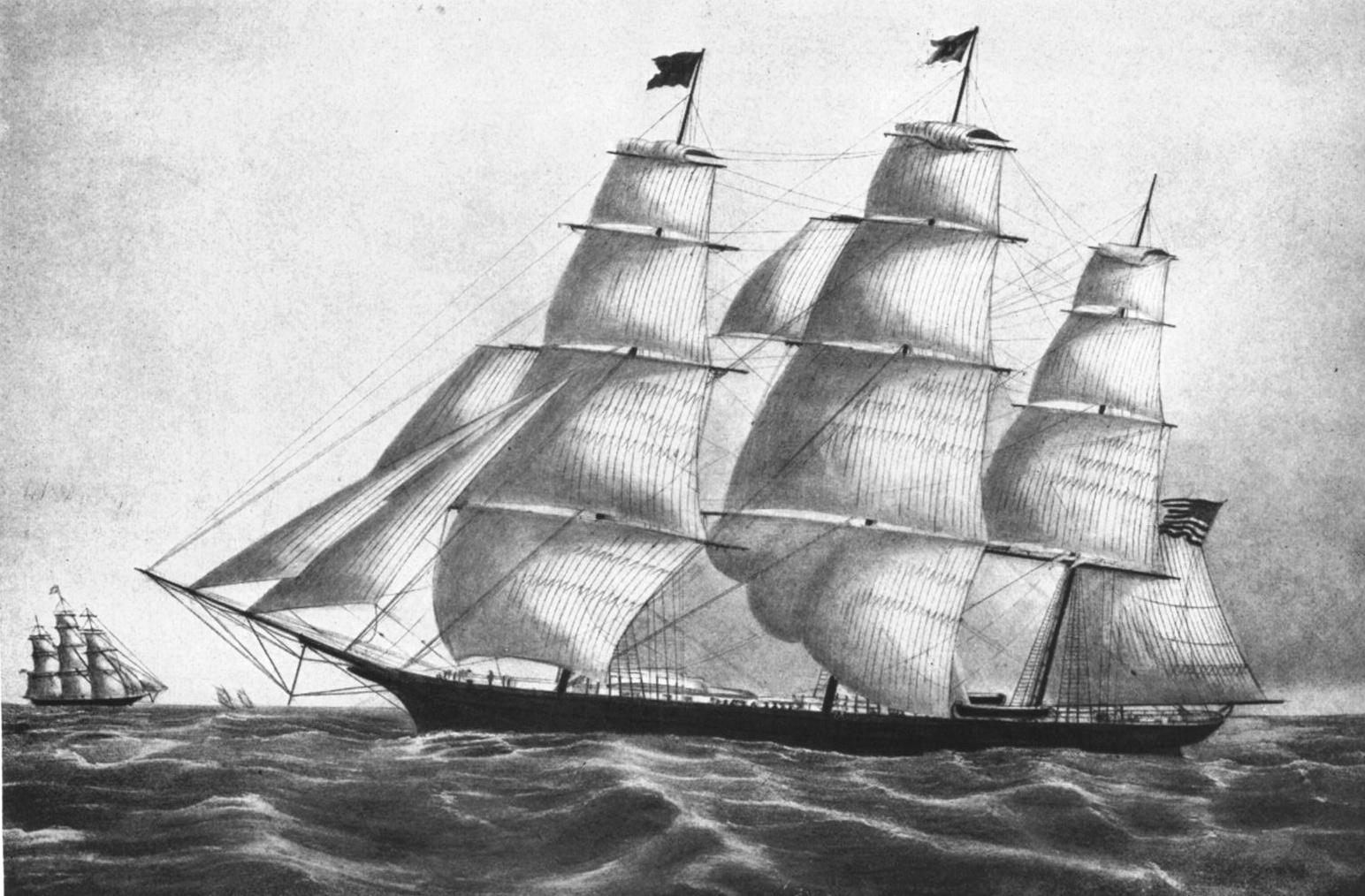

She set a record for the passage from Liverpool to San Francisco in 1872, of 99 days. She set a record for a loaded sailing ship between San Francisco to New York in 1870, 83 days: "the record for a loaded sailing ship."

== Passengers and cargo ==
In 1857, Young America transported 800 Chinese coolies from Hong Kong to Melbourne via Guichon. She sailed from Liverpool to Melbourne under Captain D.S. Babcock with 289 passengers in 1858. In 1865, she brought a cargo of sugar and hemp from Manila to New York in 100 days.

== Dismasted and run aground ==
Young America was dismasted three times. The first dismasting took place in 1859, on a voyage from New York to San Francisco, and repairs were made in Rio de Janeiro. A tornado in 09°N 032°W in 1862 carried away the masts a second time, and forced her to put in at Plymouth, England. The third time she lost her masts, in a pampero off Río de la Plata in 1868, she was jury-rigged at sea and continued to San Francisco, where she incurred $18,000 in repair costs. In 1870, she went aground on a reef near Cabo São Roque, Brazil, and had to jettison part of her cargo.

== Disappearance ==
“1886 February 17. Passed the Delaware Breakwater outward bound from Philadelphia for Fiume under command of Captain Vlassich and was never heard of again. The cargo consisted of 407.306 gallons of crude oil in 9700 barrels at a total value of $26.965.”

Another source states that "the Young America was last seen lying off Gibraltar as a coal hulk."
