= Geffrard =

British sailing ship

Coordinates: 33°37′51″S 115°09′32″E

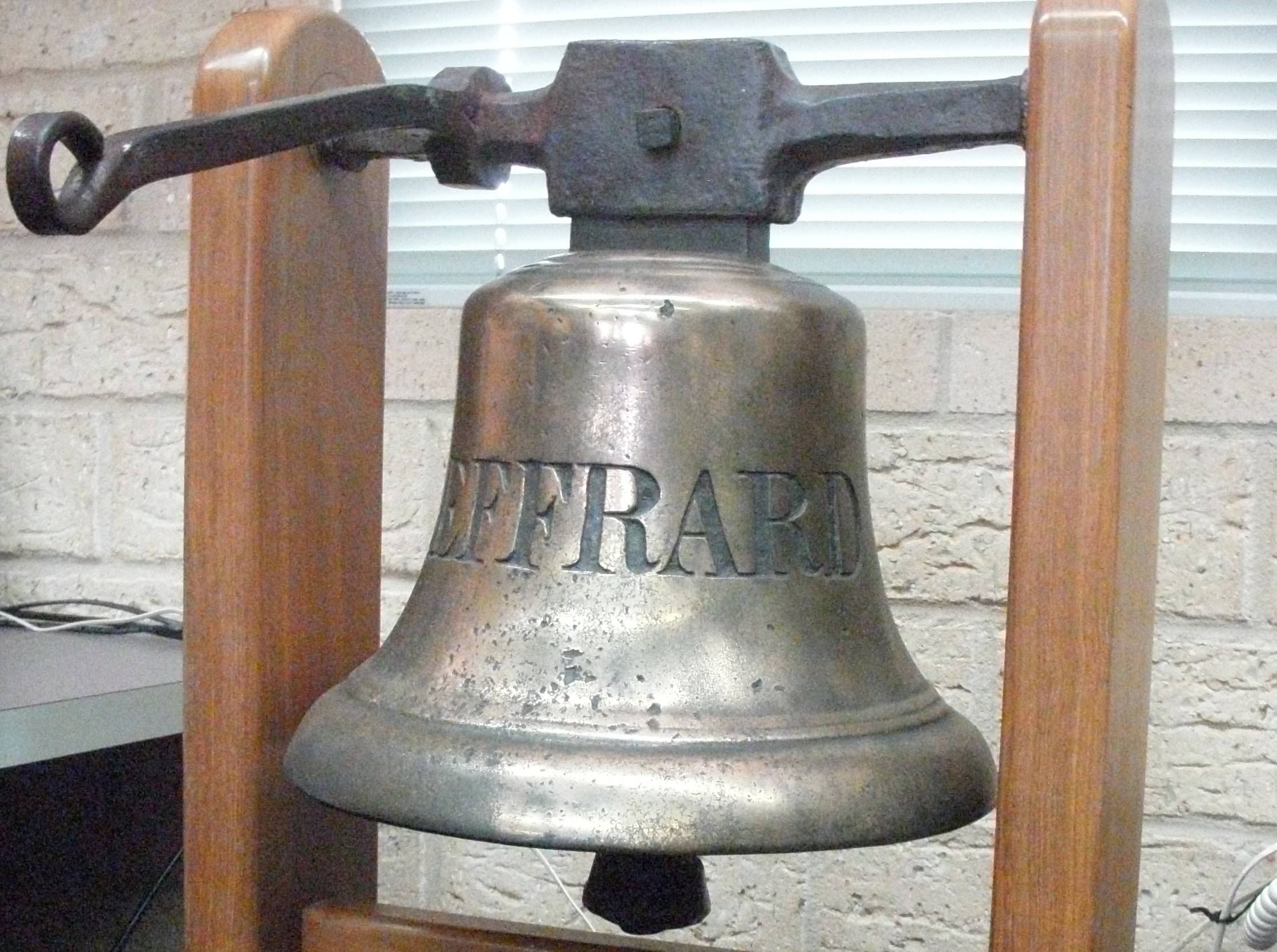
- The bell of Geffrard, hanging in Busselton Primary School

History

Australia
- Name: Geffrard
- Builder: Fred Clark
- Completed: 1853
- Identification: 23262 (Official number)
- Fate: Wrecked, 13 June 1875, Western Australia

General characteristics
- Class & type: Brig
- Tons burthen: 316.13 (bm)
- Length: 37 m (121 ft)
- Notes: Composite construction (wood and iron)

Geffrard was a 321-tons-burden British brig that traded between Australia, Mauritius, and Shanghai, and was wrecked off the coast of Western Australia on 13 June 1875. She was built in 1853 by Fred Clark in Jersey in the Channel Islands. By 1873 she had made her way to Melbourne and was owned by Fred Davis and under the control of Captain William James Munday. Her movements after that were generally around the southern coasts of Australia, from Geraldton in the west to Sydney in the east, laden with a variety of general cargo. (Note: In October 1873, Geffrard was delayed in leaving Sydney, bound for Adelaide, for more than a week.)

On 21 May 1875 she was loading timber at Quindalup, bound for Adelaide. This voyage was completed without event, and she returned to Fremantle; but three weeks later, bound on the same journey, mooring in the same place led to disaster.

== Grounding and wrecking ==
On 12 July, Geffrard took on board a load of timber, and after stowing this cargo Captain Munday went ashore (at about 6 pm) to conclude business with Henry Yelverton. He had put down a single large anchor, as was usual for a brig of that type, and was confident that this would hold through the coming storm. However, due to a faulty weld in the chain, the chain parted and the ship went aground on a sand bank. By the morning, she was breaking up and nothing could be done to save her.

Munday was charged with negligence, but exonerated by an inquiry conducted by the Collector of Customs at Busselton.

The salvaged materials from the wreck were auctioned by the Manning company in Fremantle, six months after the grounding. All fittings were bought by Yelverton, who installed the ship's bell outside his office at Quindalup beach.

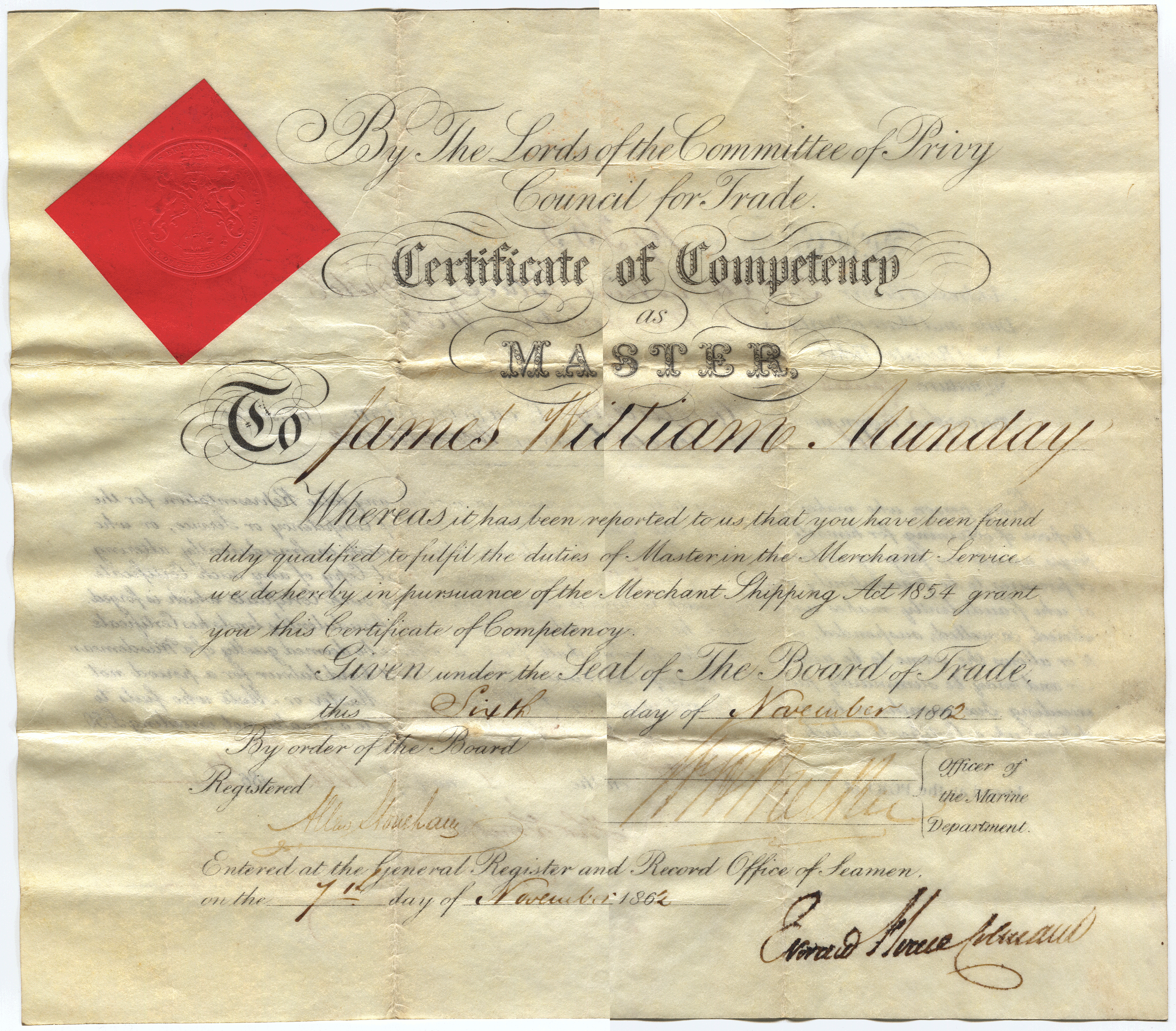
James William Munday's Master's Certificate, 6 November 1862

Munday died in November of the same year, in Melbourne and after a prolonged illness. A memorial to him and his wife still stands in the Busselton Pioneer Cemetery, not far from Yelverton's.

The spot where the ship went aground was still known as the Geffrard Bank in the late 1940s.

== Ship's bell ==
After being salvaged, the ship's bell was placed at Henry Yelverton's house office, where it was used for many years to mark the start and end of the working day. According to his grandson H. G. Yelverton, after Yelverton's death his son gave the bell to G. B. Milne, the headmaster of the Busselton school, for installation at the school.

== Rediscovery of the wreck ==
In 2009 and 2011 archeological surveys were undertaken by the Western Australian Museum, and what were almost certainly the remains of the Geffrard were discovered and documented.

The first survey was conducted as part of the 2009 Western Australian Museum Australian Leadership Awards Fellowship (ALAF) placement, and led by Wendy van Duivenvoorde. Three other vessels wrecked in the area and were of interest during this survey: Governor Endicott in 1840; Halcyon in 1845; and Ella Gladston in 1878 (refloated).

The primary locating documentation was W. E. Archdeacon's map of 1876.
