= PS Young Australian =

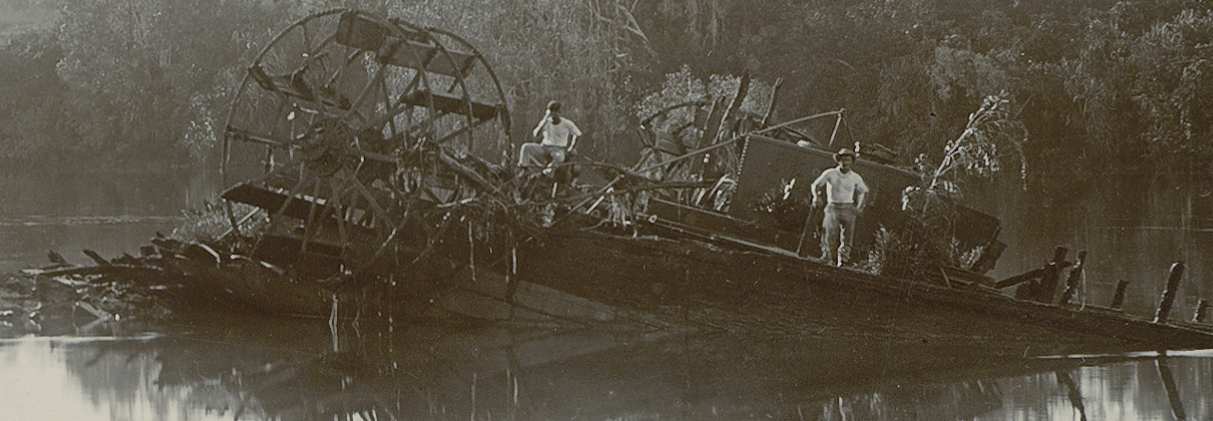
- Wreck of the PS Young Australian in the Roper River, April 1889.

History

South Australia
- Name: Young Australian
- Operator: Charles Todd
- Builder: Money Wigram & Sons
- Commissioned: 12 October 1853
- Stricken: February 1873
- Fate: Sunk, 30 December 1872

General characteristics
- Type: Paddle steamer
- Tonnage: 92.59 GRT
- Length: 28.23 m (92.6 ft)
- Beam: 4.87 m (16 ft)
- Draught: 2.5 m (8 ft)
- Sail plan: Schooner
- Complement: 7 crew

PS Young Australian was a paddle steamer that was lost on the Roper River in what is now the Northern Territory of Australia.

In 1854, Young Australian was driven ashore at Cape Northumberland in South Australia. It serviced the Roper River in the Northern Territory for twenty years before sinking in 1872 while bringing supplies for the overland telegraph work crews at Roper Bar. Young Australian sunk upstream from the settlement at Ngukurr, and can still be seen in the river on the edge of the Limmen National Park.

In 1980, the wreck site was listed on the now-defunct Register of the National Estate.

Young Australian received an Engineering Heritage Marker from Engineers Australia as part of its Engineering Heritage Recognition Program.
