= Squan Beach =

Inhabited barrier peninsula of New Jersey, United States

Coordinates: 39.9970°N 74.0649°W

Squan Beach is the historic name of a barrier spit located on the Jersey Shore of the Atlantic Ocean in Ocean County, New Jersey, United States. Since the closing of Cranberry Inlet around 1812, it has been joined physically to Island Beach, and is a major component of the Barnegat Peninsula.

== Geography ==
Squan Beach is a barrier peninsula that separates the Atlantic Ocean from Barnegat Bay. It abuts the mainland at the north end, and joins Island Beach to the south. Due to the former shifting of the Manasquan Inlet, which at times had been as far north as Stockton Lake, the portion of Manasquan in Monmouth County lying east of Watson's Creek may be considered a truncated portion of Squan Beach.

It was described in 1834 as,

Squan Beach extends from Old Cranberry inlet, N, 10 miles to Manasquan inlet, dividing for part of that distance, Barnegat bay, from the Atlantic ocean. It nowhere exceeds half a mile in width

An 1878 description of Squan Beach follows, viz,

Squan Beach, a peninsula, extends from Manasquan River to the former site of Cranberry Inlet. It lies nearly its whole length between the upper part of Barnegat bay and the Atlantic Ocean. It nowhere extends a half mile in width, and the distance named for its length is about twelve miles. It is, however, now continuous with Island Beach, the whole length of the peninsula to Barnegat Inlet being from twenty-three to twenty-four miles. About the year 1750 an inlet broke through this beach nearly opposite Tom's River, which seems to have had different names at different periods. It is most commonly known as Cranberry Inlet. This inlet was navigable for many years, and in Faden's map of New Jersey, 1777, it is called New Inlet, and is represented to be as wide as any other inlet on the coast except Great Egg Harbor.

== Communities ==
Communities on the peninsula include Point Pleasant Beach, Bay Head, Mantoloking, Lavallette, Normandy Beach, and Ortley Beach. Brick Township Beaches I, II, and III, and the Toms River Township communities of Dover Beaches North (Ocean Beach and Chadwick Beach), and Dover Beaches South are also located on the peninsula.
