= List of shipwrecks in 1833 =

The list of shipwrecks in 1833 includes ships sunk, foundered, grounded, or otherwise lost during 1833.

table of contents
← 1832 / 1833 / 1834 →
Jan	Feb	Mar	Apr
May	Jun	Jul	Aug
Sep	Oct	Nov	Dec
Unknown date

== Unknown date ==
List of shipwrecks: Unknown date in 1833
Ship	State	Description
Abbondanza	(Austria) Austrian Navy	The sloop-of-war was wrecked before 26 March.
Arcadia	United States	The brig was wrecked on Anegada, Virgin Islands.
Amelia Wilson	United Kingdom	The whaler was wrecked on rocks about 40 miles north of Port Lloyd in the Bonin Islands in May or June 1833. The crew were saved, but some 1440 barrels of oil were lost.
Bacalha	United Kingdom	The ship was wrecked near Beachy Head, Sussex.
Britannia	United Kingdom	The ship was wrecked on a reef off Amber Island, Mauritius. All on board were rescued.
Catherine	United Kingdom	The ship was either wrecked or abandoned whilst on a voyage from Irvine, Ayrshire to British North America.
Crown	United Kingdom	The ship was either wrecked or abandoned whilst on a voyage between the United Kingdom and British North America.
Deux Marie	France	The ship was wrecked on Île Bourbon.
Devon	United Kingdom	The whaler foundered off the coast of New Holland.
Doris	United Kingdom	The ship was wrecked at Benicarló, Spain. She was on a voyage from Benicarló to Hull, Yorkshire.
Esclaviana	Brazil	The ship was lost off "Ceitar". Her crew were rescued. She was on a voyage from Gibraltar to Pará.
Fenella	flag unknown	The ship was presumed to have foundered whilst on a voyage from Mauritius to the Cape Colony.
Fortitude	(United Kingdom of Great Britain and Ireland) New Zealand	The schooner ran aground and was wrecked close to the mouth of the Whirinaki River in Hokianga Harbour, New Zealand.
General Gascoyne	United Kingdom	The East Indiaman was driven ashore in Bengal.
Hannah	United Kingdom	The ship was either wrecked or abandoned whilst on a voyage from Belfast, County Antrim to British North America.
Hydra	British East India Company	The East Indiaman was wrecked in the Philippine Islands, Spanish East Indies.
Kinnersley Castle	United Kingdom	The ship was driven ashore and wrecked at Mille Roches, Ontario, British North America.
La Lilloise	France	The brig was reported to have been wrecked on Vanikoro. This report was later dismissed as having been made in error. The last known position of La Lilloise was in the Denmark Strait.
Lord Byron	United Kingdom	The ship was wrecked at "Hunbia". She was on a voyage from London to Gabon. Her crew were rescued.
Margaret Ritchie	United Kingdom	The ship was either lost or abandoned whilst on a voyage from Ardrossan, Ayrshire to British North America.
Mars	United Kingdom	The ship foundered in the Atlantic Ocean with the loss of all but three of her crew. She was on a voyage from Tampico, Mexico to Mobile, Alabama, United States.
Mary	United Kingdom	The ship was either lost or abandoned whilst on a voyage from Liverpool, Lancashire to Newfoundland, British North America.
Mary	Unknown	The brig was lost in the vicinity of "Squan," a term used at the time for the coast of New Jersey near Manasquan and sometimes for the 7-mile (11 km) stretch of coast between Manasquan Inlet and Cranberry Inlet or for the entire coast of New Jersey between Sea Girt and Barnegat Inlet.
Mary Ann	(United Kingdom of Great Britain and Ireland) New South Wales	The whaler was lost.
Nanine	United Kingdom	The ship was wrecked at Bahia Blanca, Brazil.
Nantais	France	The whaler was wrecked on the coast of Madagascar.
Neptune	(United Kingdom of Great Britain and Ireland) British North America	The ship was wrecked downstream of Quebec City, Lower Canada.
Peppell	United Kingdom	The ship was wrecked at New Calabar. She was on a voyage from Africa to Liverpool.
USS Porpoise	United States Navy	The 12-gun schooner was wrecked in the West Indies.
Raikes	United Kingdom	The ship was either wrecked or abandoned whilst on a voyage from Liverpool to Newfoundland.
Rose	France	The whaler was lost between Valdivia and Concepción, Chile.
Samuel Brown	United Kingdom	The ship was wrecked at Mauritius. She was on a voyage from Bengal, India to London.
Susan	United Kingdom	The ship was lost off "Prince's Island". She was on a voyage from Africa to Liverpool.
Sylph	United Kingdom	The ship was either wrecked or abandoned whilst on a voyage from Liverpool to Newfoundland.
Thomas	United Kingdom	The ship was wrecked on White Island, Rupert's Land.
Villagevise	France	The ship foundered in the Mediterranean Sea off the coast of Sardinia. Her crew were rescued. She was on a voyage from Toulon, Var to Bugia, Algeria.
Volunteer	United Kingdom	The ship was either wrecked on abandoned whilst on a voyage from Cork to British North America.
