= List of shipwrecks in 1827 =

The list of shipwrecks in 1827 includes some ships sunk, wrecked or otherwise lost during the calendar year of 1827.

table of contents
← 1826 / 1827 / 1828 →
Jan	Feb	Mar	Apr
May	Jun	Jul	Aug
Sep	Oct	Nov	Dec
Unknown date

== Unknown date ==
List of shipwrecks: Unknown date 1827
Ship	State	Description
Boston	United States	The ship was abandoned in the Atlantic Ocean. All on board were rescued by Thomas (United Kingdom).
Bridgend	United Kingdom	The brig was abandoned in the Atlantic Ocean. Her crew were rescued.
Canon	France	The brig was wrecked near Livorno, Kingdom of Sardinia in the winter of 1826-1827.^{[Note 1]} her eight crew were rescued by Hector (United Kingdom).
Concord	United Kingdom	The ship foundered in the Atlantic Ocean whilst on a voyage from Liverpool, Lancashire to Mobile, Alabama, United States.
Daniel	(United Kingdom of Great Britain and Ireland) British North America	The ship was abandoned in the Atlantic Ocean. She was on a voyage from Labrador to Gibraltar.
Diligent	United States	The Schooner vanished after leaving the West Indies for home.
Elizabeth	United Kingdom	The ship foundered in the Indian Ocean. Her crew were rescued. She was on a voyage from the Cape of Good Hope to Mauritius.
Fancy	United Kingdom	The ship foundered in the Baltic Sea before 24 July. She was on a voyage from Memel, Prussia to Hull, East Riding of Yorkshire.
Florida	Unknown	The schooner was lost on Island Beach on the coast of New Jersey.
James Varney	flag unknown	The ship was wrecked on Anegada before 30 September.
Lewis	Unknown	The full-rigged ship was lost on Island Beach on the coast of New Jersey.
Mapaio	Imperial Brazilian Navy	The corvette foundered at sea.
Orbit	Unknown	The schooner was lost in the vicinity of "Squan Beach," a term used at the time for the coast of New Jersey near Manasquan and sometimes for the 7-mile (11 km) stretch of coast between Manasquan Inlet and Cranberry Inlet or for the entire coast of New Jersey between Sea Girt and Barnegat Inlet.
Solon	Unknown	The schooner was lost on Island Beach on the coast of New Jersey.
Sovereign	(United Kingdom of Great Britain and Ireland) British North America	The barque was lost before 30 October.
Speculation	United Kingdom	The ship was lost in the Baltic Sea before 27 March.
Swift	United Kingdom	The ship was wrecked on Rodrigues, Mauritius. She was on a voyage from Singapore to Île Bourbon.
Waterloo	(United Kingdom of Great Britain and Ireland) Barbados	The schooner was wrecked on the coast of Puerto Rico.

== Notes ==
1. "Winter" means 21 December 1826 - 20 March 1827.
