= List of shipwrecks in 1835 =

The list of shipwrecks in 1835 includes ships sunk, foundered, wrecked, grounded or otherwise lost during 1835.

table of contents
← 1834 / 1835 / 1836 →
Jan	Feb	Mar	Apr
May	Jun	Jul	Aug
Sep	Oct	Nov	Dec
Unknown date

== Unknown date ==
List of shipwrecks: Unknown date 1835
Ship	State	Description
A. J. Donelson	Unknown	The barque was lost in the vicinity of "Squan Beach," a term used at the time for the coast of New Jersey near Manasquan and sometimes for the 7-mile (11 km) stretch of coast between Manasquan Inlet and Cranberry Inlet or for the entire coast of New Jersey between Sea Girt and Barnegat Inlet.
Bella Maria	Brazil	The ship was wrecked near Rio Grande. She was on a voyage from Pernambuco to Rio Grande.
Coquette (or Coquet)	United Kingdom	The Southseaman was never heard from again after speaking to another whaler off the coast of Japan in July. One report claimed she was lost at Guam on 4 November.
Freedom	United Kingdom	The ship was wrecked on the coast of Labrador, British North America before 22 November. Her crew were rescued.
John and Mary	United Kingdom	The ship was sunk by ice off Cape Breton Island, Nova Scotia, British North America before 2 June.
Jonathan Myer	Unknown	The schooner was lost in the vicinity of "Squan Beach," a term used at the time for the coast of New Jersey near Manasquan and sometimes for the 7-mile (11 km) stretch of coast between Manasquan Inlet and Cranberry Inlet or for the entire coast of New Jersey between Sea Girt and Barnegat Inlet.
Lancaster	United Kingdom	The ship was wrecked on Sarn Badrig, in Cardigan Bay, before 10 May.
Latona	United Kingdom	During a voyage from Padstow, Cornwall, England, to Quebec City, Lower Canada, British North America, the merchant ship was abandoned in the Atlantic Ocean in a sinking condition. Olga (flag unknown) rescued her crew.
Lola May	Unknown	The brig was lost in the vicinity of "Squan Beach," a term used at the time for the coast of New Jersey near Manasquan and sometimes for the 7-mile (11 km) stretch of coast between Manasquan Inlet and Cranberry Inlet or for the entire coast of New Jersey between Sea Girt and Barnegat Inlet.
Lydia	Unknown	The schooner was lost at Cranberry Inlet on the coast of New Jersey.
Madeleine	United Kingdom	The ship foundered off the Cape Verde Islands whilst on a voyage from London to Sydney, New South Wales. Her crew were rescued.
Magnet	United Kingdom	The ship sank at Sierra Leone.
Mary Ann	United States	The schooner was abandoned in the Atlantic Ocean in late February or early March. Her crew were rescued by the full-rigged ship Humphrey (United States).
HCS Research	United Kingdom	The ship was lost at Nursapore.
Sir Charles Paton	United Kingdom	The ship was lost in the Sunda Strait.
Sovereign	Unknown	The full-rigged ship was lost in the vicinity of "Squan Beach," a term used at the time for the coast of New Jersey near Manasquan and sometimes for the 7-mile (11 km) stretch of coast between Manasquan Inlet and Cranberry Inlet or for the entire coast of New Jersey between Sea Girt and Barnegat Inlet. Her wreck later was salvaged.
Young William	United Kingdom	The ship was wrecked at Richibucto, New Brunswick, British North America before 15 October.
