= USS La Vallette =

Two ships of the United States Navy have borne the name USS La Vallette, named in honor of Rear Admiral Elie A. F. La Vallette.

- USS La Vallette (DD-315), was a Clemson-class destroyer, launched in 1919 and scrapped in 1931
- USS La Vallette (DD-448), was a Fletcher-class destroyer, launched in 1942 and struck in 1974
