= List of shipwrecks in 1826 =

The list of shipwrecks in 1826 includes some ships sunk, wrecked or otherwise lost during 1826.

table of contents
← 1825 / 1826 / 1827 →
Jan	Feb	Mar	Apr
May	Jun	Jul	Aug
Sep	Oct	Nov	Dec
Unknown date

== Unknown date ==
List of shipwrecks: Unknown date in 1826
Ship	State	Description
Alkmonack	United Kingdom	The ship was lost in St Mary's River, Africa. She was on a voyage from London to St. Mary's River.
Betsey and Jane	United Kingdom	The ship was lost on the coast of Newfoundland, British North America, before 23 June.
Buenos Aires	Argentine Navy	The frigate foundered off Cape Horn, Chile.
Commerce	United Kingdom	The ship was lost on Cabo Catoche, Mexico. She was on a voyage from "Porto Cavello" to Campeche, Mexico.
Cora	United Kingdom	The brig was lost off the coast of India sometime before 10 March. Her crew were rescued.
Cora	United Kingdom	The ship was wrecked off Rio de la Hacha, Gran Colombia. Her crew were rescued. She was on a voyage from Kingston, Jamaica, to Rio de la Hacha.
Hannah Ann	Unknown	The sloop was lost in the vicinity of "Squan," a term used at the time for the coast of New Jersey near Manasquan and sometimes for the 7-mile (11 km) stretch of coast between Manasquan Inlet and Cranberry Inlet or for the entire coast of New Jersey between Sea Girt and Barnegat Inlet.
London	United Kingdom	The ship was wrecked in Owhyee. She was on a voyage from Peru to China.
HMS Martin	Royal Navy	The 18-gun sloop-of-war foundered whilst on a voyage from the United Kingdom to India, with the loss of all hands.
Petit Auguste	France	The ship was wrecked near "Laguna". She was on a voyage from Havre de Grâce to Campeche, Mexico.
Pylades	United Kingdom	The ship was wrecked on the coast of Newfoundland before 23 June.
Thetis	United States	The ship was lost off the coast of Africa before 19 August.
Vrow Gebke	Hamburg	The ship was driven ashore and wrecked between Quillebeuf-sur-Seine, Eure, and Tancarville, Seine-Inférieure, France. Her cargo of zinc sheets was salvaged in August 1834.
