= Island Beach =

Island Beach may refer to:

- Island Beach (barrier island), a barrier peninsula in Ocean County, New Jersey, U.S.
  - Island Beach, New Jersey, a former municipality on the peninsula
  - Island Beach State Park, a park occupying the land of the former municipality
- Island Beach, South Australia, a locality on Kangaroo Island
