= List of shipwrecks in 1828 =

The list of shipwrecks in 1828 includes some ships sunk, wrecked or otherwise lost during 1828.

table of contents
1828
Jan	Feb	Mar	Apr
May	Jun	Jul	Aug
Sep	Oct	Nov	Dec
Unknown date

== Unknown date ==
List of shipwrecks: Unknown date 1828
Ship	State	Description
Adamant	United Kingdom	Her crew abandoned Adamant, Brown, master, as she was sailing from Quebec to London. Endeavour, of Hull, fell in with her and drove her onshore near Glace Bay. She was then sold under the authority of the Collector of Excise.
Betsey	United Kingdom	The ship was lost on the coast of Labrador, British North America after 17 October. She was on a voyage from Quebec City, Lower Canada to Tralee, County Cork.
Bona Vista	United Kingdom	The ship was wrecked on Kendall's Reef, Torres Straits. Her crew survived.
Caledonia	United Kingdom	The ship foundered off Strathy Head, Caithness some time before 4 April.
HMS Doris	Royal Navy	The frigate foundered off the coast of Brazil. Her crew were rescued.
Elizabeth	United Kingdom	The whaler was lost in the Davis Straits.
HMS Hearty	Royal Navy	The Cherokee-class brig-sloop foundered. Hearty was serving as a packet ship and was last seen a few days out of Barbados. She was officially paid off on 2 February 1828.
Kentish	United Kingdom	The ship was run down and sunk by Clyde (United Kingdom).
Madeira	United States	The ship was wrecked at Maranhão, Brazil.
Maria	Imperial Russian Navy	The transport ship foundered in the Gulf of Burgas with the loss of all on board, over 200 lives.
Marvel	Unknown	The brig was lost on Island Beach on the coast of New Jersey.
Mobile	Unknown	The brig was lost in the vicinity of "Squan Beach," a term used at the time for the coast of New Jersey near Manasquan and sometimes for the 7-mile (11 km) stretch of coast between Manasquan Inlet and Cranberry Inlet or for the entire coast of New Jersey between Sea Girt and Barnegat Inlet.
Morning Star	United Kingdom	The ship was captured and scuttled in the Atlantic Ocean off Ascension Island by Defensor de Pedro (Argentina). Her crew were murdered.
Paragon	United States	The whaler was wrecked in the Friendly Islands.
Post Boy	Unknown	The schooner was lost on Island Beach on the coast of New Jersey.
Relámpago	Spanish Navy	The ship-of-the-line was lost with all hands. She was on a voyage from Cádiz to the Spanish East Indies.
Speculation	United Kingdom	The brig was wrecked at Cape Gregory, Newfoundland, British North America "at the end of the year". The wreck was burnt the following spring.
St. Anne	Spain	The East Indiaman was lost with all hands. She was on a voyage from Cádiz to the Spanish East Indies.
William	United Kingdom	The armed brig was wrecked on a reef off Barbuda in mid-December.
