= Ocean Beach, New Jersey =

Ocean Beach may refer to one of the following places in the US state of New Jersey:

- Ocean Beach, Monmouth County, New Jersey
- Ocean Beach, Ocean County, New Jersey
