= List of shipwrecks in 1832 =

The list of shipwrecks in 1832 includes ships sunk, foundered, grounded, or otherwise lost during 1832.

table of contents
1832
Jan	Feb	Mar	Apr
May	Jun	Jul	Aug
Sep	Oct	Nov	Dec
Unknown date

== Unknown date ==
List of shipwrecks: Unknown date 1832
Ship	State	Description
Agnes	United Kingdom	The ship was wrecked near Pernambuco, Brazil. She was on a voyage from Liverpool, Lancashire to Pernambuco.
Almorah	United Kingdom	The ship foundered in the Atlantic Ocean.
Celia	United Kingdom	The brig was wrecked off Ouessant, Finistère, France. She was on a voyage from Launceston, Van Diemen's Land and Sydney, New South Wales to London.
Christine Louisa	Unknown	The full-rigged ship was lost in the vicinity of "Squan Beach," a term used at the time for the coast of New Jersey near Manasquan and sometimes for the 7-mile (11 km) stretch of coast between Manasquan Inlet and Cranberry Inlet or for the entire coast of New Jersey between Sea Girt and Barnegat Inlet.
Droto	Austrian Empire	The ship was wrecked on the coast of Istria. She was on a voyage from Marseille, Bouches-du-Rhône, France to Trieste.
Eliza	United Kingdom	The ship was driven ashore on Île Bourbon before 7 November. She was subsequently burnt by local inhabitants.
Enterprise	United Kingdom	The whaler was wrecked at Cape Horn, Chile before 21 August.
Fame	United Kingdom	The ship was wrecked on the coast of Newfoundland, British North America.
Friendship	United States	The schooner was lost off Cape Sable Island. Crew saved.
General Putman	Unknown	The full-rigged ship was lost on Island Beach on the coast of New Jersey.
Henry (or Henry V)	United Kingdom	The ship sprang a leak and was abandoned in the Atlantic Ocean. All on board, in excess of 180 people, were rescued by Redwing (United Kingdom). Henry was on a voyage from Neath and Swansea, Glamorgan to Quebec City, Lower Canada, British North America.
Hunter	Unknown	The brig was lost in the vicinity of "Squan Beach," a term used at the time for the coast of New Jersey near Manasquan and sometimes for the 7-mile (11 km) stretch of coast between Manasquan Inlet and Cranberry Inlet or for the entire coast of New Jersey between Sea Girt and Barnegat Inlet.
Mary and Eliza	Unknown	The vessel was lost in the vicinity of "Squan Beach," a term used at the time for the coast of New Jersey near Manasquan and sometimes for the 7-mile (11 km) stretch of coast between Manasquan Inlet and Cranberry Inlet or for the entire coast of New Jersey between Sea Girt and Barnegat Inlet.
Matthew	(United Kingdom of Great Britain and Ireland) New South Wales	The ship was wrecked on Tahiti before 6 November.
Mermaid	(United Kingdom of Great Britain and Ireland) New South Wales	The whaler was wrecked in the Bass Strait before 18 February. At least fourteen of her crew survived.
Proseus	(United Kingdom of Great Britain and Ireland) New South Wales	The whaler was driven ashore on Gore Island.
Richard	United Kingdom	The ship was wrecked in the Charles River, a tributary of the Saint Lawrence River.
Resolucion	Chile	The ship was wrecked in the Cocos Islands.
Royalist	United Kingdom	The whaler struck a reef on one of the Philippine Islands before 21 September. She was taken in to Ternate, Maluku Islands where she was declared a constructive total loss.
Shooters	United Kingdom	The whaler was wreckedon Gore Island.
Sophia Jane	(United Kingdom of Great Britain and Ireland) New South Wales	The ship was wrecked om Desolation Island before 6 June.
St. Vincent	(United Kingdom of Great Britain and Ireland) Saint Vincent	The ship was driven ashore at "Abscum". She was on a voyage from Saint Thomas, Virgin Islands to New York, United States.
Sultan	United Kingdom	The ship was lost near Prince Edward Island, British North America. She was on a voyage from New York to Miramichi, New Brunswick, British North America.
Union	United Kingdom	The ship was wre3cked on Red Island, Newfoundland before 23 August. She was on a voyage from an Irish port to Quebec City.
Virginie	France	The ship was driven ashore at "Laguna" before 27 November. She was on a voyage from Guadeloupe to Marseille, Bouches-du-Rhône.
Vrow Gertrude	Netherlands	The ship was wrecked at Malta.
Warren	United States	The ship was wrecked on Cape Cod, Massachusetts with the loss of nine of her seventeen crew. She was on a voyage from the Turks Islands to Boston, Massachusetts.
Wilhelmina	Russia	The ship was wrecked at Tarragona, Spain.
