= List of shipwrecks in May 1835 =

The list of shipwrecks in May 1835 includes ships sunk, foundered, wrecked, grounded or otherwise lost during May 1835.

== 1 May ==
List of shipwrecks: 1 May 1835
Ship	State	Description
Isabella	United Kingdom	The ship was driven ashore at Leith, Lothian. She was on a voyage from Canton, China to Leith.
Salamis	United Kingdom	The ship foundered with the loss of all but three of her crew. She was on a voyage from a Mediterranean port to Newcastle upon Tyne, Northumberland.

== 2 May ==
List of shipwrecks: 2 May 1835
Ship	State	Description
Camilla	United Kingdom	The ship departed from Madras for Calcutta, India. No further trace, presumed foundered with the loss of all hands.
Samuel	United Kingdom	The ship sprang a leak and foundered in the English Channel 10 nautical miles (19 km) north north west of The Needles, Isle of Wight. Her crew were rescued. She was on a voyage from Teignmouth, Devon to Ipswich, Suffolk.

== 3 May ==
List of shipwrecks: 3 May 1835
Ship	State	Description
Antwerp Welwaren	United Kingdom	The ship was wrecked in the Abaco Islands. She was on a voyage from Antwerp to Havana, Cuba.

== 6 May ==
List of shipwrecks: 6 May 1835
Ship	State	Description
Jeune d'Anathole	France	The ship was wrecked on Sherborough Island, Sierra Leone. She was on a voyage from Marseille, Bouches-du-Rhône to Sierra Leone.
Williams	United Kingdom	The ship was wrecked on the Middle Sand, in the North Sea off the coast of Essex. Her crew were rescued. She was on a voyage from Alloa, Stirlingshire to London.

== 9 May ==
List of shipwrecks: 9 May 1835
Ship	State	Description
Alexander	United Kingdom	The ship was wrecked on the Zuider Haaks Bank, in the North Sea off the coast of the Netherlands. She was on a voyage from London to Hamburg.

== 10 May ==
List of shipwrecks: 10 May 1835
Ship	State	Description
Hindoo	United Kingdom	The ship was wrecked on Sarn Badrig, in Cardigan Bay. All on board survived. She was on a voyage from Demerara to Liverpool, Lancashire.

== 11 May ==
List of shipwrecks: 11 May 1835
Ship	State	Description
Merchant	United Kingdom	The ship ran aground on the Money Weight Bank, in the Irish Sea off the coast of County Wexford and was abandoned by her crew. She was on a voyage from Bermuda to Liverpool, Lancashire. Merchant ran aground on the Blackwater Bank on 13 May and was wrecked.

== 13 May ==
List of shipwrecks: 13 May 1835
Ship	State	Description
Clementina	United Kingdom	The sloop was wrecked at "Ardnacroish", Kirkcudbrightshire.
Isabella	United Kingdom	The whaler was lost in the Davis Strait. Survivors were rescued by William Torr (United Kingdom) or reached land in their boats.
Neva	United Kingdom	The convict ship, a barque, was wrecked in the Bass Strait with the loss of 234 of the 239 people on board.
Union	United Kingdom	The ship was wrecked at Moy, County Tyrone. She was on a voyage from Ballina, County Mayo to London.

== 15 May ==
List of shipwrecks: 15 May 1835
Ship	State	Description
Clyde	United Kingdom	The ship was lost at the entrance of Chaleur Bay. Her seven crew were rescued by Forster (United Kingdom). She was on a voyage from Troon, Ayrshire to Dalhousie, New Brunswick, British North America.

=== 16 May ===
List of shipwrecks: 16 May 1835
Ship	State	Description
Mary	United Kingdom	The sloop foundered off the Saltee Islands, County Wexford. Her three crew were rescued by William Rathbone (United Kingdom).

== 17 May ==
List of shipwrecks: 17 May 1835
Ship	State	Description
Friendship	(United Kingdom of Great Britain and Ireland) New South Wales	The schooner was driven ashore and wrecked on Norfolk Island. All on board were rescued.
George and Mary	United Kingdom	The ship was crushed by ice and foundered off Paul's Island, Labrador, British North America. Her crew were rescued by the barque Asia (United Kingdom).

== 19 May ==
List of shipwrecks: 19 May 1835
Ship	State	Description
HMS Challenger	Royal Navy	HMS Challenger. The sixth rate was wrecked off Mocha Island, Chile with the loss of two lives. Survivors were rescued on 15 June by HMS Blonde (Royal Navy).
Lapa	United States	The whaler foundered in the Atlantic Ocean (1°S 38°W). Her crew survived.

== 20 May ==
List of shipwrecks: 20 May 1835
Ship	State	Description
Mail	United Kingdom	The ship was lost near Rio Grande, Brazil. Her crew were rescued. She was on a voyage from Rio de Janeiro to Rio Grande.

== 21 May ==
List of shipwrecks: 21 May 1835
Ship	State	Description
Gulnare	(United Kingdom of Great Britain and Ireland) British North America	The ship was driven ashore and wrecked in Long Bay, Barbados.

== 23 May ==
List of shipwrecks: 23 May 1835
Ship	State	Description
William and Tom	United Kingdom	The smack was wrecked on the West Mouse Sand, in Liverpool Bay. Her crew were rescued. She was on a voyage from Cork to Liverpool, Lancashire.

== 24 May ==
List of shipwrecks: 24 May 1835
Ship	State	Description
Anchor	United Kingdom	The ship was wrecked at Bolt Head, Devon. She was on a voyage from Belfast, County Antrim to London.
Gerulamo	Cuba	The ship was wrecked on the Man-of-War Reef. She was on a voyage from New York to Matanzas.
Hazard	United Kingdom	The ship was driven ashore and wrecked at Salcombe, Devon. She was on a voyage from Dublin to London.

== 27 May ==
List of shipwrecks: 27 May 1835
Ship	State	Description
Doncaster	United Kingdom	The brig was crushed by ice and sank off St. Paul Island, Nova Scotia, British North America. Her six crew were rescued by the brig Dorothys (United Kingdom). She was on a voyage from Newcastle upon Tyne, Northumberland to Miramichi, New Brunswick, British North America.
Sofia Elena	Grand Duchy of Tuscany	The ship caught fire and was scuttled at Malta. She was on a voyage from Alexandria, Egypt to Livorno.
Thomas	(United Kingdom of Great Britain and Ireland) Saint Lucia	The sloop was driven ashore and wrecked on Saint Lucia.

== 28 May ==
List of shipwrecks: 28 May 1835
Ship	State	Description
Mersey	United Kingdom	The ship was lost near Charleston, South Carolina, United States. She was on a voyage from Mobile, Alabama to Charleston.

== 30 May ==
List of shipwrecks: 30 May 1835
Ship	State	Description
Mary and Elizabeth	(United Kingdom of Great Britain and Ireland) Tasmania	The brig was wrecked at Port Sorell, Van Diemen's Land. Her crew were rescued. She was on a voyage from Hobart, Van Diemen's Land to Portland Bay.

== Unknown date ==
List of shipwrecks: Unknown date 1835
Ship	State	Description
Belina	United Kingdom	The ship was in collision with Coatham (United Kingdom) and foundered. She was on a voyage from Saint Vincent to Newfoundland, British North America.
Catherina Maria	Norway	The ship was wrecked at Bilbao, Spain.
Constance	United Kingdom	The brig sprang a leak and was abandoned in the Atlantic Ocean (49°N 32°W).
James H Albuoy or Sir H. Albury	United Kingdom	The ship was wrecked on Cape Sable Island, Nova Scotia, British North America before 2 May. Her crew were rescued. She was on a voyage from Liverpool, Nova Scotia to Liverpool, Lancashire.
Maria	Greifswald	The ship foundered off Prerow, Prussia. All on board were rescued. She was on a voyage from Leith, Lothian, United Kingdom to Greifswald.
Marshall	United Kingdom	The ship was wrecked in the Saint Lawrence River before 1 June. Subsequently repaired.
Melona	United Kingdom	The snow was driven ashore at Corton, Suffolk before 27 May. She was on her maiden voyage.
Port Maquarie Packet	(United Kingdom of Great Britain and Ireland) New South Wales	The schooner was wrecked at Port Macquarie before 5 May.
Tantivy	United Kingdom	The ship was wrecked on Cape Sable Island.
