= List of shipwrecks in 1836 =

The list of shipwrecks in 1836 includes ships sunk, foundered, wrecked, grounded, or otherwise lost during 1836.

table of contents
1836
Jan	Feb	Mar	Apr
May	Jun	Jul	Aug
Sep	Oct	Nov	Dec
Unknown date

== Unknown date ==
List of shipwrecks: Unknown date in 1836
Ship	State	Description
Actif	France	The ship was lost on a voyage from Pondicherry to Calcutta, India. Her crew were rescued.
Agnes	United Kingdom	The ship was driven ashore and wrecked at Demerara.
Amalia	Kingdom of Sardinia	The ship was lost on the coast off Rio Grande do Norte, Brazil. She was on a voyage from Genoa to Montevideo, Uruguay.
Ann	United Kingdom	The ship was lost in the Persian Gulf before 25 February. Her crew were rescued.
Astros	Unknown	The brig was lost in the vicinity of "Squan Beach," a term used at the time for the coast of New Jersey near Manasquan and sometimes for the 7-mile (11 km) stretch of coast between Manasquan Inlet and Cranberry Inlet or for the entire coast of New Jersey between Sea Girt and Barnegat Inlet.
Avon	(United Kingdom of Great Britain and Ireland) British North America	The sealer was lost before 16 April.
Babe	(United Kingdom of Great Britain and Ireland) British North America	The sealer was lost before 16 April.
Camille	France	The ship was wrecked at the Cape of Good Hope. Her crew were rescued.
Calypso	United Kingdom	The ship was wrecked at Benin City, Dahomey. Her crew were rescued. She was on a voyage from Benin City to Liverpool, Lancashire.
Carnation	United Kingdom	The ship was driven ashore in the Gulf of Finland. She was on a voyage from Saint Petersburg, Russia to London. She was later refloated and put into Helsingør, Denmark, where she arrived on 12 May.
Charles Doggett	United States	The brig was wrecked on Rora Tonga, in the Society Islands. All on board were rescued.
Corinthian	United Kingdom	The ship was driven ashore in the Saint Lawrence River.
Desiré	France	The ship foundered whilst on a voyage from Goree, Zeeland, Netherlands to Senegal. Her crew were rescued.
Falcon	United Kingdom	The whaler was wrecked on Ascension Island. Many of her crew were murdered by the local inhabitants.
Fancy Jane	(United Kingdom of Great Britain and Ireland) British North America	The sealer was lost before 16 April.
Fanny	(United Kingdom of Great Britain and Ireland) British North America	The sealer was lost before 16 April.
Gordon	United Kingdom	The ship foundered off New Zealand.
Gustave	France	The ship was lost at Tampico, Mexico. Her crew were rescued. She was on a voyage from Bordeaux, Gironde to Tampico.
Henri	France	The ship was lost off the Chiloé Archipelago.
Laure	France	The ship was lost near Pará, Brazil. She was on a voyage from Bordeaux, Gironde to Valparaíso, Chile.
Louisa	United States	The ship was lost in the Bahamas. She was on a voyage from New York to Jamaica.
Mars	United Kingdom	The ship was wrecked on "Coney Island, near St. Laurence".
Mary Ann	United Kingdom	The ship was lost at British Honduras. She was on a voyage from British Honduras to London.
Notre Dame	France	The ship was lost in Bonavista Bay.
Phoenix	United Kingdom	The barque was wrecked on Car Nicobar. Her crew were rescued.
Portaferry	United Kingdom	The ship was wrecked at Malta. Her crew were rescued.
Rothschild	United Kingdom	The ship was driven ashore at Savannah, Georgia, United States. She was on a voyage from Liverpool to Savannah. She was later refloated and taken into Savannah for repairs.
Royal William	United Kingdom	The ship was wrecked on "Barnaby Island". She was on a voyage from Newfoundland to Quebec City, Lower Canada, British North America.
São Joao Baptiste	Brazil	The ship was lost near "Aricauti". She was on a voyage from Pernambuco to Maranhão.
Sibylla	United States	The ship sank at Reedy Island, Delaware. She was refloated in November 1842 and taken into Philadelphia, Pennsylvania.
Tom Cod	(United Kingdom of Great Britain and Ireland) British North America	The sealer was lost before 16 April.
Voltaire	France	The ship was wrecked on Île Bourbon. Her crew were rescued.
Walker	United Kingdom	The ship was wrecked on Cape Breton Island, Nova Scotia, British North America. She was on a voyage from Grenada to Quebec City, Lower Canada, British North America.
