= USS La Vallette (DD-448) =

Fletcher-class destroyer

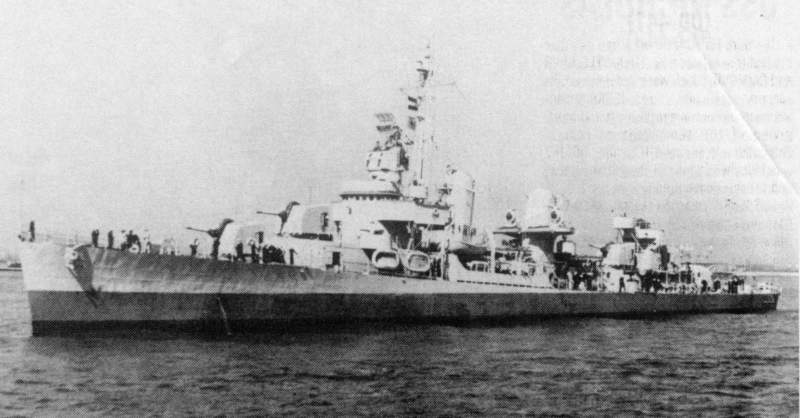
- USS La Vallette (DD-448)

History

United States
- Name: La Vallette
- Namesake: Rear Admiral Elie A. F. La Vallette
- Builder: Federal Shipbuilding and Drydock Company
- Laid down: 27 November 1941
- Launched: 21 June 1942
- Commissioned: 12 August 1942
- Decommissioned: 16 April 1946
- Stricken: 1 February 1974
- Fate: Sold 26 July 1974 to Peru as parts donor, scrapped

General characteristics
- Class & type: Fletcher-class destroyer
- Displacement: 2,100 tons
- Length: 376 ft 3 in (114.68 m)
- Beam: 39 ft 8 in (12.09 m)
- Draft: 13 ft (4.0 m)
- Propulsion: 60,000 shp (45 MW); geared turbines; 2 propellers
- Speed: 36 knots (67 km/h; 41 mph)
- Range: 6,500 nautical miles at 15 kt; (12,000 km at 30 km/h)
- Complement: 273 officers and enlisted
- Armament: 5 × single Mk 12 5 in (127 mm)/38 guns; 5 × twin 40 mm (1.6 in) Bofors AA guns; 7 × single 20 mm (0.8 in) Oerlikon AA guns; 2 × quintuple 21 in (533 mm) torpedo tubes; 6 × single depth charge throwers; 2 × depth charge racks

USS La Vallette (DD-448) was a World War II-era Fletcher-class destroyer in the service of the United States Navy. She was the second Navy ship named after Rear Admiral Elie A. F. La Vallette.

La Vallette was laid down 27 November 1941 by Federal Shipbuilding and Drydock Company, Kearny, New Jersey; launched 21 June 1942; sponsored by Mrs. Lucy La Vallette Littel, great-granddaughter of Rear Admiral LaVallette; and commissioned 12 August 1942.

== History ==
After training and escort duty in the Caribbean and Atlantic, La Vallette departed New York 16 December 1942 for the Panama Canal and Pacific duty.

=== Battle of Rennell Island ===
Her first contact with the enemy came on 29 January 1943, at about 19:00 when she sighted a formation of 11 to 13 Japanese bombers, in three close formation sections 12 miles west of her position. The aircraft were identified as "Bettys" carrying out strafing and torpedo runs. One torpedo was reported as passing astern and the cruiser USS Chicago was hit by two torpedoes, causing heavy damage and bringing her to a dead stop, necessitating her being taken in tow. La Vallette claimed to have shot down three aircraft using her 5-inch guns.

The following day, Chicago was attacked again, 34 miles south of Rennell Island by a group of 11 Bettys at an altitude of 500 feet, from the ship's port beam. The starboard section of aircraft attacked La Vallette, two aircraft were claimed shot-down and her 20mm and 40mm guns had three aircraft approaching from the starboard section under fire, two of which passed over the ship in flames. Five others passed about 600 yards from her port side, with two more reported to be on fire. Five torpedoes were dropped and as the ship swung left, a torpedo hit the destroyer in her forward engine room, killing 22 of her crew and causing heavy damage. Chicago was sunk as a result of four more torpedo hits.

Following this action, La Vallette was towed to Espiritu Santo by the USS Navajo, arriving on 3 February 1943.

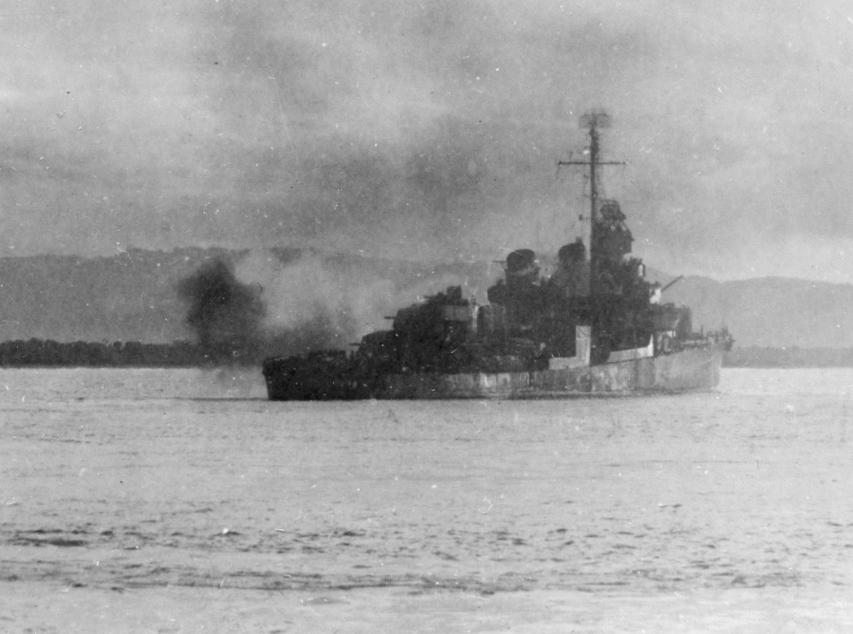
La Vallette shelling Mindoro in December 1944.

Once repaired, La Vallette left 6 August for Pearl Harbor, where she joined a carrier force for a strike on Marcus Island 31 August before returning to patrol duty in the Solomon Islands. On the nights of 1 and 2 October, she spotted Japanese barges off Kolombangara, of which she claimed four sunk and two damaged. La Vallette carried out escort and screening assignments during the Gilbert landings, and strikes against Kwajalein and Wotje atolls. Brief repairs at San Francisco followed, after which she returned to the South Pacific.

=== Later actions ===
On 1 February 1944, she took part in the preinvasion bombardment of Roi, part of the Kwajalein complex, in April she shelled Aitape, and on 2 July supported the landings on Noemfoor, off New Guinea. Constant patrol and escort duties were performed between these actions.

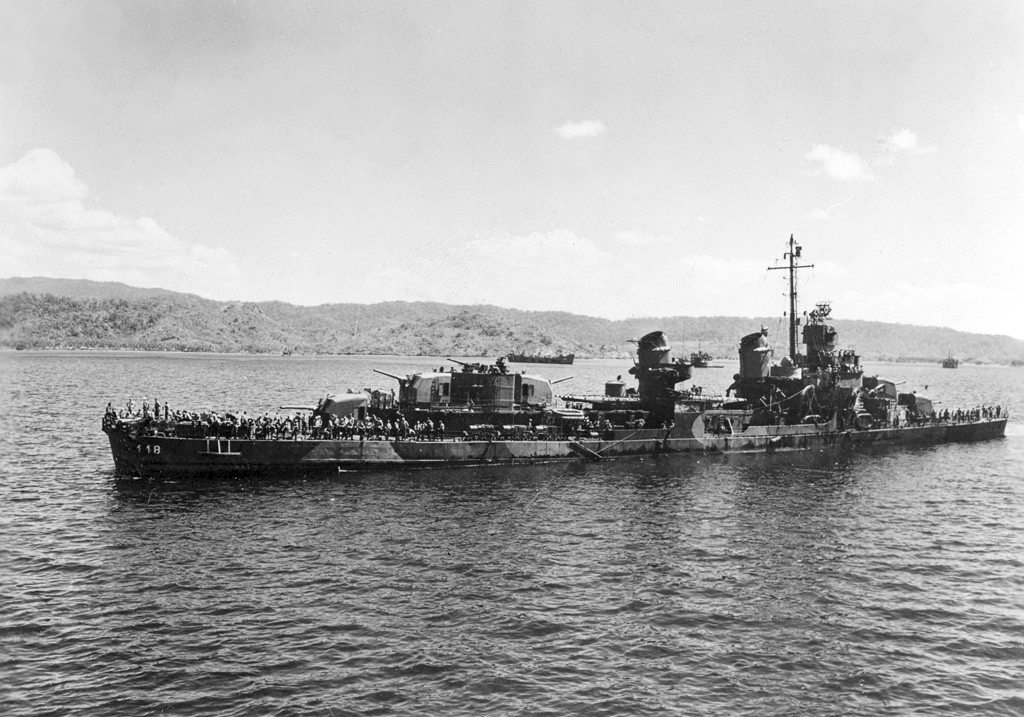
La Vallette off Mariveles after being mined, February 1945.

Assigned to escort convoys during the first assaults on the Philippines, La Vallette had already left Leyte Gulf with a convoy to replenish her stores at Hollandia before the Battle of Leyte Gulf, returning to the Philippines by 5 December. She covered five more landings in the Philippines during December and January 1945, then joined the screen for minesweepers clearing Manila Bay. On 14 February in Mariveles Bay La Vallette was badly damaged by a mine, leaving six dead and 23 wounded, she was towed to drydock at Subic Bay, then sailed for Hunters Point Navy Yard where she was fully repaired. On 7 August she sailed for San Diego, California, decommissioned 16 April 1946 and entered the Reserve Fleet, where she remained until 1969. In 1974 she was sold to Peru, cannibalized for spare parts for the other Fletcher Class destroyers of the Peruvian Navy and her hull sold for scrap.

== Honors ==
La Vallette received 10 battle stars for World War II service.
