= USS La Vallette (DD-315) =

Clemson-class destroyer

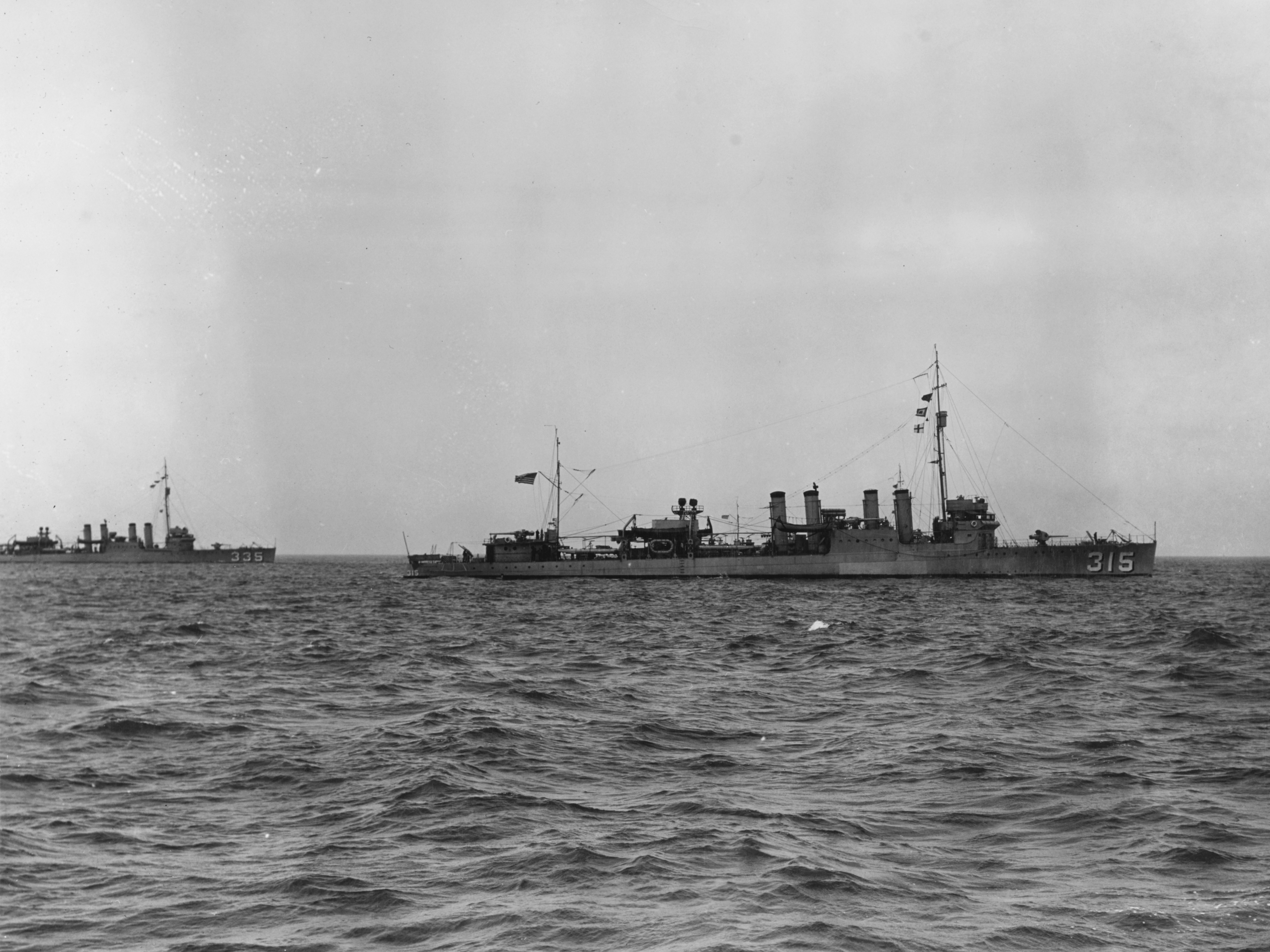

History

United States
- Namesake: Elie A. F. La Vallette
- Builder: Bethlehem Shipbuilding Corporation, Union Iron Works, San Francisco
- Laid down: 14 April 1919
- Launched: 15 July 1919
- Commissioned: 24 December 1920
- Decommissioned: 19 April 1930
- Stricken: 22 July 1930
- Fate: Sold for scrap, 10 June 1931

General characteristics
- Class & type: Clemson-class destroyer
- Displacement: 1,290 long tons (1,311 t) (standard); 1,389 long tons (1,411 t) (deep load)
- Length: 314 ft 4 in (95.8 m)
- Beam: 30 ft 11 in (9.42 m)
- Draught: 10 ft 3 in (3.1 m)
- Installed power: 27,000 shp (20,000 kW); 4 water-tube boilers
- Propulsion: 2 shafts, 2 steam turbines
- Speed: 35 knots (65 km/h; 40 mph) (design)
- Range: 2,500 nautical miles (4,600 km; 2,900 mi) at 20 knots (37 km/h; 23 mph) (design)
- Complement: 6 officers, 108 enlisted men
- Armament: 4 × single 4-inch (102 mm) guns; 2 × single 1-pounder AA guns or; 2 × single 3-inch (76 mm) guns; 4 × triple 21 inch (533 mm) torpedo tubes; 2 × depth charge rails

USS LaVallette (DD-315) was a Clemson-class destroyer in service with the United States Navy from 1920 to 1930. She was scrapped in 1931.

== Description ==
The Clemson class was a repeat of the preceding Wickes class although more fuel capacity was added. The ships displaced 1,290 long tons (1,311 t) at standard load and 1,389 long tons (1,411 t) at deep load. They had an overall length of 314 feet 4 inches (95.8 m), a beam of 30 feet 11 inches (9.4 m) and a draught of 10 feet 3 inches (3.1 m). They had a crew of 6 officers and 108 enlisted men.

Performance differed radically between the ships of the class, often due to poor workmanship. The Clemson class was powered by two steam turbines, each driving one propeller shaft, using steam provided by four water-tube boilers. The turbines were designed to produce a total of 27,000 shaft horsepower (20,000 kW) intended to reach a speed of 35 knots (65 km/h; 40 mph). The ships carried a maximum of 371 long tons (377 t) of fuel oil which was intended gave them a range of 2,500 nautical miles (4,600 km; 2,900 mi) at 20 knots (37 km/h; 23 mph).

The ships were armed with four 4-inch (102 mm) guns in single mounts and were fitted with two 1-pounder guns for anti-aircraft defense. In many ships a shortage of 1-pounders caused them to be replaced by 3-inch (76 mm) guns. Their primary weapon, though, was their torpedo battery of a dozen 21 inch (533 mm) torpedo tubes in four triple mounts. They also carried a pair of depth charge rails. A "Y-gun" depth charge thrower was added to many ships.

== Construction and career ==
La Vallette, named for Elie A. F. La Vallette, was laid down 14 April 1919 by Bethlehem Shipbuilding Corporation, San Francisco, California; launched 15 July 1919; sponsored by Miss Nancy Lane, daughter of the Secretary of the Interior; and commissioned 24 December 1920. Homeported at San Diego, California throughout her service La Vallette participated in the intensive training schedule through which the peacetime Navy maintained its readiness. West coast operations were highlighted by annual Pacific Fleet battle practice in Hawaiian or Panamanian waters. In 1924 and 1927, La Vallette transited the Panama Canal for Caribbean maneuvers, participating in a presidential review by Calvin Coolidge 4 June 1927.

As early as 1922 La Vallette participated in antiaircraft training, and witnessed the growing importance of naval aviation while serving as plane guard for Lexington (CV-2) during the destroyer's final months of service. Also in 1922, La Valette was the first duty station of Ensign (later Vice-Admiral, permanent rank) Hyman G. Rickover, ' Father of the Nuclear Navy'. She decommissioned at San Diego 19 April 1930, and on 10 June 1931 was scrapped in accordance with the London Naval Treaty.
