= Lavallette, New Jersey =

Borough in Ocean County, New Jersey, US

- Borough
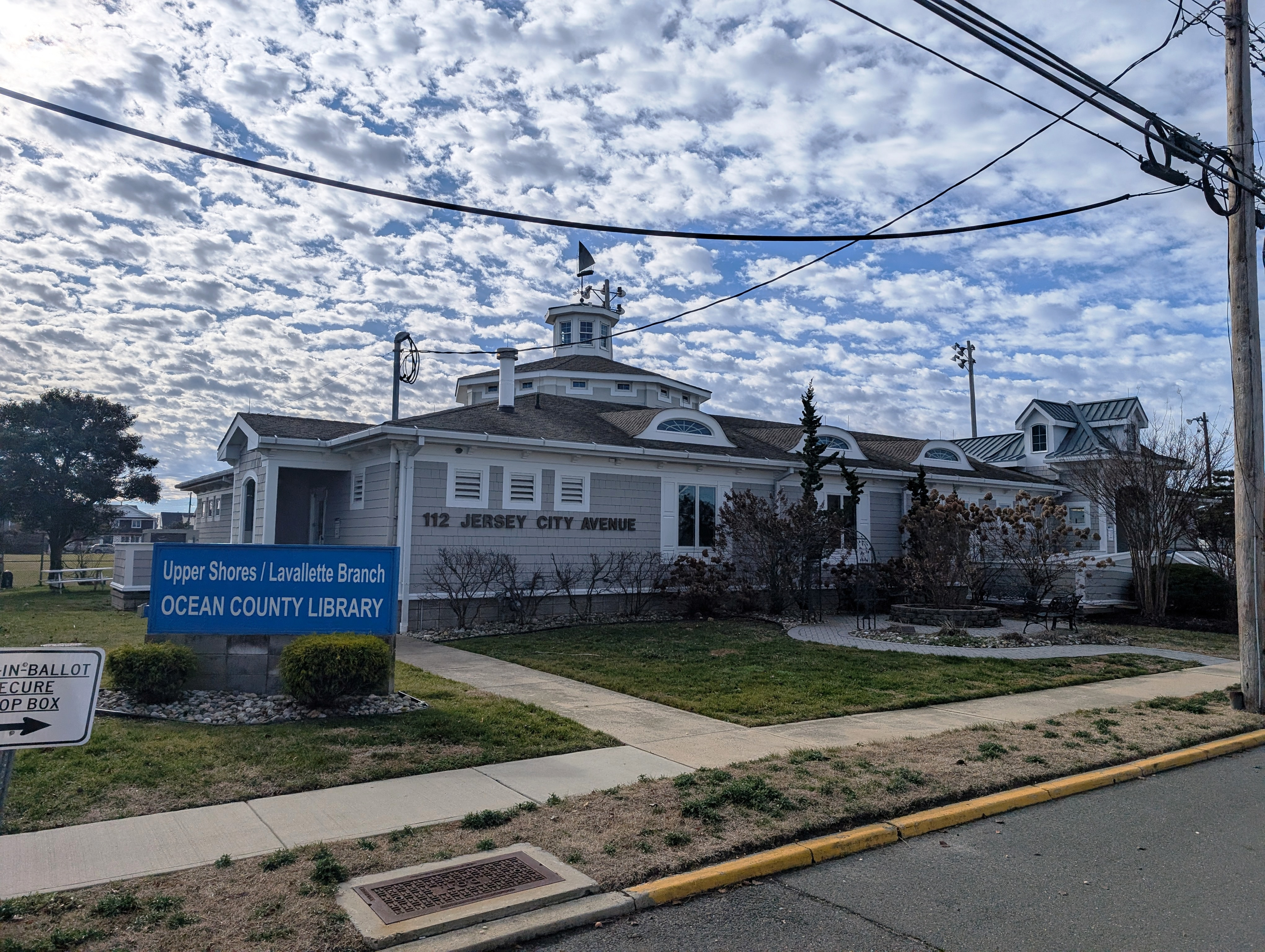
- Upper Shores / Lavallette Branch of the Ocean County Library

- Seal

- Location of Lavallette in Ocean County highlighted in red (right). Inset map: Location of Ocean County in New Jersey highlighted in orange (left).

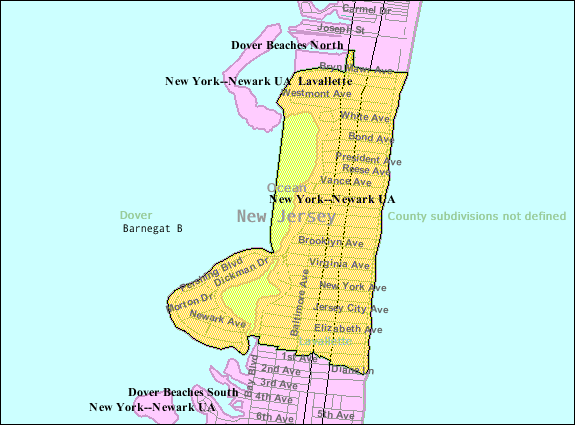
- Census Bureau map of Lavallette, New Jersey

- Location in Ocean County Location in New Jersey Location in the United States
- Coordinates: 39.969474°N 74.07188°W
- Country: United States
- state: New Jersey
- County: Ocean
- Incorporated: December 21, 1887
- Named for: Elie A. F. La Vallette

Government
  - Type: Borough
  - Body: Borough Council
  - Mayor: Walter G. LaCicero (R, term ends December 31, 2026)
  - Administrator: John Bennett
  - Municipal clerk: Donnelly Amico

Area
  - Total: 0.97 sq mi (2.50 km^{2})
  - Land: 0.81 sq mi (2.11 km^{2})
  - Water: 0.15 sq mi (0.38 km^{2}) 15.42%
  - Rank: 506th of 565 in state 26th of 33 in county
- Elevation: 3 ft (0.91 m)

Population (2020)
  - Total: 1,787
  - Estimate (2023): 1,843
  - Rank: 495th of 565 in state 23rd of 33 in county
  - Density: 2,190.2/sq mi (845.6/km^{2})
  - Rank: 281st of 565 in state 14th of 33 in county
- Time zone: UTC−05:00 (Eastern (EST))
  - Summer (DST): UTC−04:00 (Eastern (EDT))
- ZIP Code: 08735
- Area code: 732 Exchanges: 793, 830, 854
- FIPS code: 3402939390
- GNIS feature ID: 885273
- Website: www.lavallette.org

Lavallette is a borough situated on the Jersey Shore, in Ocean County, in the U.S. state of New Jersey. As of the 2020 United States census, the borough's population was 1,787, a decrease of 88 (−4.7%) from the 2010 census count of 1,875, which in turn had reflected a decline of 790 (−29.6%) from the 2,665 counted in the 2000 census. Lavallette is situated on the Barnegat Peninsula, a long, narrow barrier peninsula that separates Barnegat Bay from the Atlantic Ocean.

== History ==
Lavallette was incorporated as a borough by an act of the New Jersey Legislature on December 21, 1887, from portions of Dover Township (now Toms River Township), based on the results of a referendum held two days earlier.

Lavallette was named for Elie A. F. La Vallette, one of the first rear admirals appointed in the United States Navy when President Abraham Lincoln created the rank in July 1862, and the father of Albert T. Lavallette, co-founder of the borough.

New Jersey Monthly magazine ranked Lavallette as its 8th best place to live in its 2008 rankings of the "Best Places To Live" in New Jersey.

== Geography ==
According to the United States Census Bureau, the borough had a total area of 0.96 square miles (2.50 km^{2}), including 0.82 square miles (2.11 km^{2}) of land and 0.15 square miles (0.38 km^{2}) of water (15.42%).

The borough borders the Ocean County municipality of Toms River Township.

== Demographics ==
Historical population
Census	Pop.	Note	%±
1900	21		—
1910	42		100.0%
1920	117		178.6%
1930	287		145.3%
1940	315		9.8%
1950	567		80.0%
1960	832		46.7%
1970	1,509		81.4%
1980	2,072		37.3%
1990	2,299		11.0%
2000	2,665		15.9%
2010	1,875		−29.6%
2020	1,787		−4.7%
2023 (est.)	1,843	▲	3.1%
Population sources: 1900–2000 1900–1920; 1900–1910 1910–1930; 1940–2000 2000; 2010 2020

=== 2010 census ===
The 2010 United States census counted 1,875 people, 945 households, and 557 families in the borough. The population density was 2,319.2 inhabitants per square mile (895.4/km^{2}). There were 3,207 housing units at an average density of 3,966.8 per square mile (1,531.6/km^{2}). The racial makeup was 97.87% (1,835) White, 0.11% (2) Black or African American, 0.00% (0) Native American, 0.53% (10) Asian, 0.00% (0) Pacific Islander, 1.01% (19) from other races, and 0.48% (9) from two or more races. Hispanic or Latino of any race were 2.99% (56) of the population.

Of the 945 households, 11.4% had children under the age of 18; 47.8% were married couples living together; 9.0% had a female householder with no husband present and 41.1% were non-families. Of all households, 36.7% were made up of individuals and 21.9% had someone living alone who was 65 years of age or older. The average household size was 1.98 and the average family size was 2.57.

11.0% of the population were under the age of 18, 5.0% from 18 to 24, 13.1% from 25 to 44, 30.6% from 45 to 64, and 40.4% who were 65 years of age or older. The median age was 60.3 years. For every 100 females, the population had 86.4 males. For every 100 females ages 18 and older there were 85.9 males.

The Census Bureau's 2006–2010 American Community Survey showed that (in 2010 inflation-adjusted dollars) median household income was $60,296 (with a margin of error of +/− $4,961) and the median family income was $76,797 (+/− $16,601). Males had a median income of $48,810 (+/− $40,510) versus $39,643 (+/− $14,630) for females. The per capita income for the borough was $39,293 (+/− $5,500). About 4.7% of families and 7.3% of the population were below the poverty line, including none of those under age 18 and 11.3% of those age 65 or over.

=== 2000 census ===
As of the 2000 U.S. census, there were 2,665 people, 1,208 households, and 741 families residing in the borough. The population density was 3,315.1 inhabitants per square mile (1,280.0/km^{2}). There were 3,210 housing units at an average density of 3,993.1 per square mile (1,541.7/km^{2}). The racial makeup of the borough was 98.12% White, 0.26% African American, 0.11% Native American, 0.15% Asian, 0.64% from other races, and 0.71% from two or more races. Hispanic or Latino of any race were 1.61% of the population.

There were 1,208 households, out of which 14.1% had children under the age of 18 living with them, 51.2% were married couples living together, 7.1% had a female householder with no husband present, and 38.6% were non-families. 34.5% of all households were made up of individuals, and 18.5% had someone living alone who was 65 years of age or older. The average household size was 2.09 and the average family size was 2.66.

In the borough the population was spread out, with 13.1% under the age of 18, 5.3% from 18 to 24, 18.3% from 25 to 44, 27.0% from 45 to 64, and 36.4% who were 65 years of age or older. The median age was 56 years. For every 100 females, there were 84.4 males. For every 100 females age 18 and over, there were 81.4 males.

The median income for a household in the borough was $43,846, and the median income for a family was $57,778. Males had a median income of $44,583 versus $32,292 for females. The per capita income for the borough was $28,588. About 5.9% of families and 8.0% of the population were below the poverty line, including 14.6% of those under age 18 and 2.7% of those age 65 or over.

== Parks and recreation ==
There are nine protected ocean beaches designated for swimming as well as two on the Barnegat Bay. Four of the ocean beaches have specifically designated areas for surfing and surf-fishing. The borough offers tennis, bocce, shuffleboard, basketball and roller blading opportunities on land while Barnegat Bay provides fishing, crabbing, swimming, boating, sailing, windsurfing and other water sports.

There are also band concerts, fireworks, and Movies on the Bay, held at the Centennial Gazebo and Gardens located at Philadelphia Avenue and the bayfront.

== Government ==
=== Local government ===
Lavallette is governed under the borough form of New Jersey municipal government, which is used in 218 municipalities (of the 564) statewide, making it the most common form of government in New Jersey. The governing body is comprised of the mayor and the borough council, with all positions elected at-large on a partisan basis as part of the November general election. The mayor is elected directly by the voters to a four-year term of office. The borough council includes six members elected to serve three-year terms on a staggered basis, with two seats coming up for election each year in a three-year cycle. The borough form of government used by Lavallette is a "weak mayor / strong council" government in which council members act as the legislative body with the mayor presiding at meetings and voting only in the event of a tie. The mayor can veto ordinances subject to an override by a two-thirds majority vote of the council. The mayor makes committee and liaison assignments for council members, and most appointments are made by the mayor with the advice and consent of the council.

As of 2024, the mayor of Lavallette is Republican Walter G. LaCicero, whose term of office ends December 31, 2027. Members of the Lavallette Borough Council are Council President Anita F. Zalom (R, 2026), James G. Borowski (R, 2024), Joanne Filippone (R, 2024), David Finter (R, 2026), Robert P. Lamb (R, 2025) and Michael Stogdill (R, 2025).

The mayoral election held on November 7, 2006, was declared null and void after allegations of voter fraud were filed by the losing candidate Walter G. LaCicero, who had lost the election by four votes; As part of a settlement agreement, Joseph Ardito stepped down from office as mayor and a special election to fill the seat was scheduled for March 13, 2007. In the rerun election, Republican LaCicero was elected Mayor was sworn into office on March 19, 2007, for a term of office ending on December 31, 2010.

=== Federal, state, and county representation ===
Lavallette is located in the 4th Congressional District and is part of New Jersey's 10th state legislative district.

For the 119th United States Congress, New Jersey's 4th congressional district is represented by Chris Smith (R, Manchester Township). New Jersey is represented in the United States Senate by Democrats Cory Booker (Newark, term ends 2027) and Andy Kim (Moorestown, term ends 2031).

For the 2026–2027 session, the 10th legislative district of the New Jersey Legislature is represented in the State Senate by James W. Holzapfel (R, Toms River) and in the General Assembly by Paul Kanitra (R, Point Pleasant Beach) and Gregory P. McGuckin (R, Toms River).

Ocean County is governed by a Board of County Commissioners composed of five members who are elected on an at-large basis in partisan elections and serving staggered three-year terms of office, with either one or two seats coming up for election each year as part of the November general election. At an annual reorganization held in the beginning of January, the board chooses a director and a deputy director from among its members. As of 2025, Ocean County's Commissioners (with party affiliation, term-end year and residence) are:

John P. Kelly (R, 2025, Eagleswood Township), Virginia E. Haines (R, 2025, Toms River), Robert Arace (R, Manchester Township, 2027) Jennifer Bacchione (R, Berkeley Township, 2027) and Frank Sadeghi (R, 2026, Toms River).

Constitutional officers elected on a countywide basis are: Clerk Scott M. Colabella (R, 2025, Barnegat Light), Sheriff Michael G. Mastronardy (R, 2025; Toms River) and Surrogate Jeffrey Moran (R, 2028, Beachwood).

=== Politics ===
As of March 2011, there were a total of 1,704 registered voters in Lavallette, of which 241 (14.1%) were registered as Democrats, 913 (53.6%) were registered as Republicans and 550 (32.3%) were registered as Unaffiliated. There were no voters registered to other parties. Among the borough's 2010 Census population, 90.9% (vs. 63.2% in Ocean County) were registered to vote, including 102.1% of those ages 18 and over (vs. 82.6% countywide).

Gubernatorial election results for Lavallette
Year	Republican		Democratic		Third party(ies)	
Year	No.	%	No.	%	No.	%
2025	831	66.75%	409	32.85%	5	0.40%
2021	821	69.46%	359	30.37%	2	0.17%
2017	626	73.47%	214	25.12%	12	1.41%
2013	752	84.12%	135	15.10%	7	0.78%
2009	784	69.38%	280	24.78%	66	5.84%
2005	738	63.73%	380	32.82%	40	3.45%

In the 2012 presidential election, Republican Mitt Romney received 66.5% of the vote (646 cast), ahead of Democrat Barack Obama with 33.3% (324 votes), and other candidates with 0.2% (2 votes), among the 980 ballots cast by the borough's 1,758 registered voters (8 ballots were spoiled), for a turnout of 55.7%. In the 2008 presidential election, Republican John McCain received 62.0% of the vote (862 cast), ahead of Democrat Barack Obama with 35.0% (487 votes) and other candidates with 1.2% (16 votes), among the 1,391 ballots cast by the borough's 1,843 registered voters, for a turnout of 75.5%. In the 2004 presidential election, Republican George W. Bush received 64.6% of the vote (949 ballots cast), outpolling Democrat John Kerry with 33.3% (489 votes) and other candidates with 0.6% (11 votes), among the 1,469 ballots cast by the borough's 1,944 registered voters, for a turnout percentage of 75.6.

Presidential Elections Results
Year	Republican	Democratic	Third Parties
2024	63.7% 909	35.1% 501	1.2% 15
2020	62.8% 908	35.8% 518	1.4% 13
2016	67.3% 818	29.9% 364	2.8% 34
2012	66.5% 646	33.3% 324	0.2% 2
2008	62.0% 862	35.0% 487	1.2% 16
2004	64.6% 949	33.3% 489	0.6% 11

In the 2013 gubernatorial election, Republican Chris Christie received 84.1% of the vote (752 cast), ahead of Democrat Barbara Buono with 15.1% (135 votes), and other candidates with 0.8% (7 votes), among the 907 ballots cast by the borough's 1,646 registered voters (13 ballots were spoiled), for a turnout of 55.1%. In the 2009 gubernatorial election, Republican Chris Christie received 67.9% of the vote (784 ballots cast), ahead of Democrat Jon Corzine with 24.2% (280 votes), Independent Chris Daggett with 5.4% (62 votes) and other candidates with 0.3% (4 votes), among the 1,155 ballots cast by the borough's 1,757 registered voters, yielding a 65.7% turnout.

United States Senate election results for Lavallette1
Year	Republican		Democratic		Third party(ies)	
Year	No.	%	No.	%	No.	%
2024	872	62.87%	504	36.34%	11	0.79%
2018	821	71.21%	307	26.63%	25	2.17%
2012	595	65.17%	307	33.63%	11	1.20%
2006	687	65.24%	345	32.76%	21	1.99%

United States Senate election results for Lavallette2
Year	Republican		Democratic		Third party(ies)	
Year	No.	%	No.	%	No.	%
2020	941	66.17%	467	32.84%	14	0.98%
2014	547	67.28%	257	31.61%	9	1.11%
2013	412	68.44%	185	30.73%	5	0.83%
2008	846	66.35%	413	32.39%	16	1.25%

== Education ==
Lavallette School District serves public school students in kindergarten through eighth grade at Lavallette Elementary School. As of the 2020–21 school year, the district, comprised of one school, had an enrollment of 156 students and 16.3 classroom teachers (on an FTE basis), for a student–teacher ratio of 9.6:1. In the 2016–17 school year, Lavallette was tied as the 23rd-smallest enrollment of any school district in the state, with 146 students.

Students in public school for ninth through twelfth grades attend Point Pleasant Beach High School in Point Pleasant Beach, as part of a sending/receiving relationship with the Point Pleasant Beach School District, together with students from Bay Head and Mantoloking. As of the 2020–21 school year, the high school had an enrollment of 382 students and 36.9 classroom teachers (on an FTE basis), for a student–teacher ratio of 10.4:1.

== Transportation ==
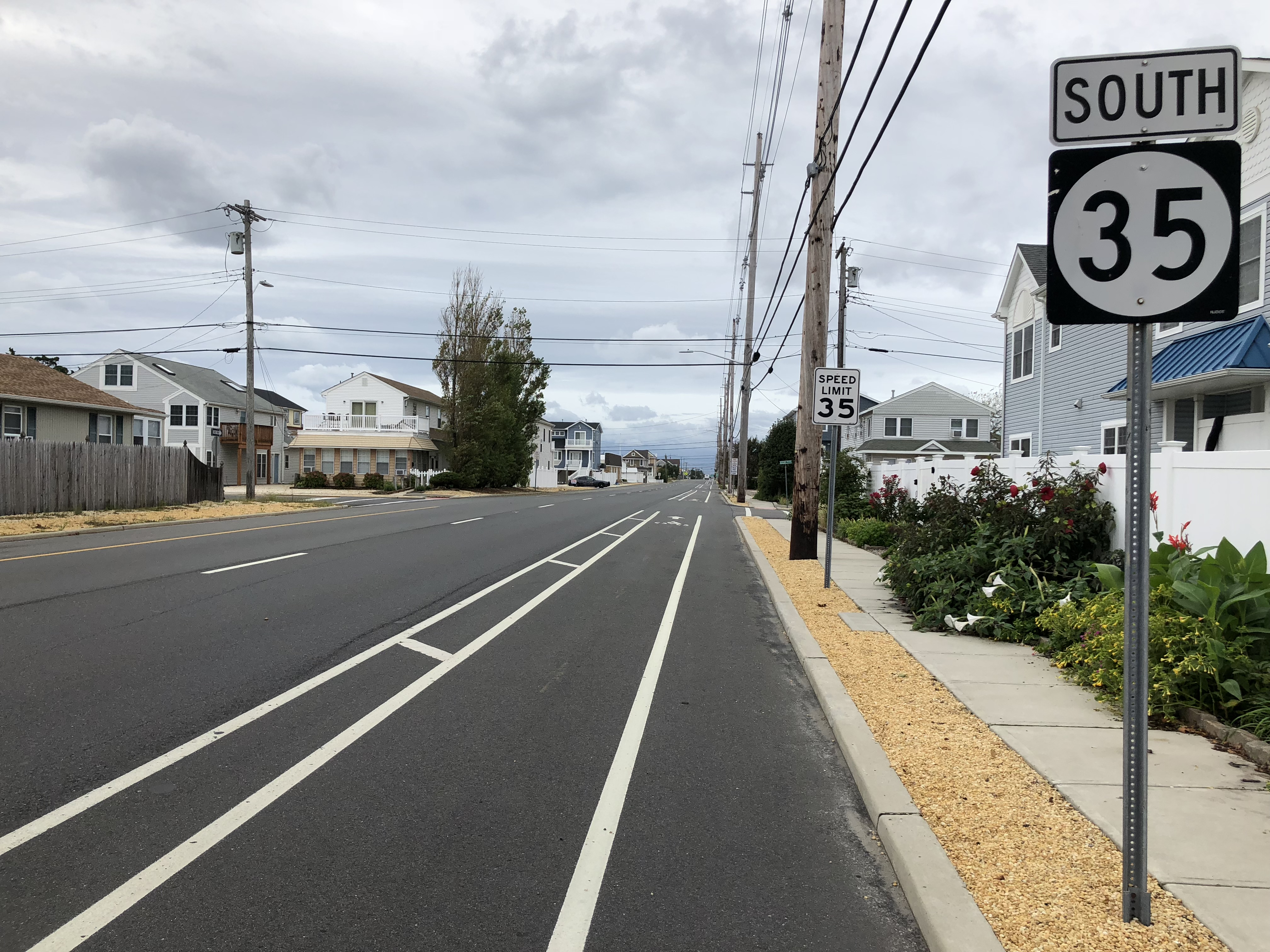
Route 35 southbound in Lavallette

=== Roads and highways ===
As of May 2010, the borough had a total of 16.55 miles (26.63 km) of roadways, of which 10.77 miles (17.33 km) were maintained by the municipality, 3.30 miles (5.31 km) by Ocean County and 2.48 miles (3.99 km) by the New Jersey Department of Transportation.

New Jersey Route 35 traverses the borough, connecting the Dover Beaches South (Ortley Beach) section of Toms River Township to the south and the Toms River community of Dover Beaches North to the north.

=== Public transportation ===
Ocean Ride local service is provided on the OC10 Toms River Connection route.

== Movie location ==
The 2007 coming-of-age romance movie Greetings from the Shore was set and shot in Lavallette.

== Climate ==
According to the Köppen climate classification system, Lavallette has a humid subtropical climate (Cfa). Cfa climates are characterized by all months having an average mean temperature above 32.0 °F (0.0 °C), at least four months with an average mean temperature at or above 50.0 °F (10.0 °C), at least one month with an average mean temperature at or above 71.6 °F (22.0 °C) and no significant precipitation difference between seasons. During the summer months in Lavallette, a cooling afternoon sea breeze is present on most days, but episodes of extreme heat and humidity can occur with heat index values at or above 95.0 °F (35.0 °C). On average, the wettest month of the year is July which corresponds with the annual peak in thunderstorm activity. During the winter months, episodes of extreme cold and wind can occur with wind chill values below 0.0 °F (−17.8 °C). The plant hardiness zone at Lavallette Beach is 7a with an average annual extreme minimum air temperature of 3.5 °F (−15.8 °C). The average seasonal (November–April) snowfall total is between 18 and 24 inches (46 and 61 cm) and the average snowiest month is February which corresponds with the annual peak in nor'easter activity.

Climate data for Lavallette Beach, NJ (1981–2010 Averages)
Month	Jan	Feb	Mar	Apr	May	Jun	Jul	Aug	Sep	Oct	Nov	Dec	Year
Mean daily maximum °F (°C)	40.4 (4.7)	42.9 (6.1)	49.6 (9.8)	59.3 (15.2)	69.1 (20.6)	78.3 (25.7)	83.5 (28.6)	82.3 (27.9)	76.3 (24.6)	65.6 (18.7)	55.3 (12.9)	45.3 (7.4)	62.4 (16.9)
Daily mean °F (°C)	32.7 (0.4)	34.8 (1.6)	41.2 (5.1)	50.5 (10.3)	60.3 (15.7)	69.7 (20.9)	75.1 (23.9)	74.1 (23.4)	67.6 (19.8)	56.4 (13.6)	47.0 (8.3)	37.5 (3.1)	54.0 (12.2)
Mean daily minimum °F (°C)	25.1 (−3.8)	26.7 (−2.9)	32.8 (0.4)	41.7 (5.4)	51.4 (10.8)	61.1 (16.2)	66.7 (19.3)	65.9 (18.8)	58.8 (14.9)	47.1 (8.4)	38.7 (3.7)	29.8 (−1.2)	45.6 (7.6)
Average precipitation inches (mm)	3.66 (93)	3.06 (78)	4.25 (108)	3.90 (99)	3.54 (90)	3.66 (93)	4.54 (115)	4.50 (114)	3.53 (90)	3.74 (95)	3.83 (97)	3.93 (100)	46.14 (1,172)
Average relative humidity (%)	65.2	62.8	60.8	62.3	65.8	70.1	69.6	71.3	70.8	69.6	68.6	66.6	67.0
Average dew point °F (°C)	22.3 (−5.4)	23.4 (−4.8)	28.7 (−1.8)	38.1 (3.4)	48.8 (9.3)	59.5 (15.3)	64.5 (18.1)	64.2 (17.9)	57.8 (14.3)	46.6 (8.1)	37.2 (2.9)	27.4 (−2.6)	43.3 (6.3)
Source: PRISM

Climate data for Sandy Hook, NJ Ocean Water Temperature (34 N Lavallette)
Month	Jan	Feb	Mar	Apr	May	Jun	Jul	Aug	Sep	Oct	Nov	Dec	Year
Daily mean °F (°C)	37 (3)	36 (2)	40 (4)	46 (8)	55 (13)	62 (17)	69 (21)	72 (22)	68 (20)	59 (15)	51 (11)	43 (6)	53 (12)
Source: NOAA

== Ecology ==
According to the A. W. Kuchler U.S. potential natural vegetation types, Lavallette would have a dominant vegetation type of Northern Cordgrass (73) with a dominant vegetation form of Coastal Prairie (20).

== Notable people ==
People who were born in, residents of, or otherwise closely associated with Lavallette include:

- William Fenn (1904–1980), cyclist who competed in two events at the 1924 Summer Olympics
- Joe Pesci (born 1943), actor

Preceded by Dover Beaches North	Beaches of New Jersey	Succeeded by Dover Beaches South
