= List of shipwrecks in 1834 =

The list of shipwrecks in 1834 includes ships sunk, foundered, wrecked, grounded or otherwise lost during 1834.

table of contents
1834
Jan	Feb	Mar	Apr
May	Jun	Jul	Aug
Sep	Oct	Nov	Dec
Unknown date

== Unknown date ==
List of shipwrecks: Unknown date 1834
Ship	State	Description
Aquatic	United Kingdom	The ship was lost at Benin City, Nigeria.
Emily Taylor	(United Kingdom of Great Britain and Ireland) Swan River Colony	The ship was wrecked in Cockburn Sound.
Endymion	United Kingdom	The ship was wrecked at Manchioneal, Jamaica. Her crew were rescued. She was bound for London.
Essex	United States	The cargo schooner was lost on the passage from New York to Port Cabello. Lost with all 5 hands.
Frederick	United Kingdom	The ship was taken by convicts and subsequently scuttled off the Chiloé Archipelago, Chile.
Gasper	(United Kingdom of Great Britain and Ireland) Gibraltar	The ship capsized at Tampico, Mexico with the loss of all hands.
Hoop	Netherlands	The brig was taken over by her crew, who murdered her captain and passengers. She was subsequently abandoned in the Amboyna Sea.
L'Aventure	France	The brig was wrecked on the coast of Africa. Her crew were rescued by a Maltese ship.
Marie Rose	France	The ship was wrecked on the American coast. She was on a voyage from Guadeloupe to Granville, Manche.
Mary	United States	The whaler was destroyed by fire at Tahiti before 6 October.
Notre Dame des Carmes	Kingdom of Sardinia	The brig was driven ashore and wrecked between Bugia and Bona, Algeria. All sixteen people on board survived, but two of the survivors were murdered by Bedouins.
Polmqua	Unknown	The sloop was lost in the vicinity of "Squan Beach," a term used at the time for the coast of New Jersey near Manasquan and sometimes for the 7-mile (11 km) stretch of coast between Manasquan Inlet and Cranberry Inlet or for the entire coast of New Jersey between Sea Girt and Barnegat Inlet.
Reliance	United Kingdom	The brig was wrecked on the Louisa Shoal, off Singapore, before 6 September. She was involved in the salvaging of the cargo of New Jersey (United States), which was wrecked there the previous November.
Robert Bruce	United States	The ship was wrecked in the Dry Tortugas before 29 July.
Shamrock	(United Kingdom of Great Britain and Ireland) New South Wales	The schooner capsized in Queen Charlotte Sound, New Zealand, during August or September. Initial reports put the loss as ten lives out of a crew of 11. However, Denmark Hill brought the master and five men back to Sydney.
Sylene	France	The brig was wrecked on the coast of Africa. Her crew were rescued by a Maltese ship.
Tamige	Kingdom of Württemberg	The ship was wrecked on Cephalonia, Greece. All on board were rescued.
Tourville	France	The ship was wrecked on St. Catherines Island Georgia, United States before 23 June. She was on a voyage from Rio de Janeiro, Brazil to Havre de Grâce, Seine-Inférieure.
