= USS Despatch (1814) =

Uninet States Navy schooner

History

United States
- Name: USS Despatch
- Acquired: 1814
- Commissioned: 1814
- Fate: Sold 1820

General characteristics
- Type: Survey ship
- Tonnage: 50 tons
- Propulsion: Sails
- Sail plan: Schooner-rigged
- Complement: 15
- Armament: 2 guns

The first USS Despatch was a United States Navy schooner in commission from 1814 to 1820.

The Department of the Navy purchased Despatch in 1814. The U.S. Navy used her primarily as a survey ship in waters along the United States East Coast.

Despatch was sold in 1820.
