= List of shipwrecks in 1825 =

The list of shipwrecks in 1825 includes some ships sunk, wrecked or otherwise lost during 1825.

table of contents
1825
Jan	Feb	Mar	Apr
May	Jun	Jul	Aug
Sep	Oct	Nov	Dec
Unknown date

== Unknown date ==
List of shipwrecks: Unknown date 1825
Ship	State	Description
Achilles	Spanish Navy	The Brig of War was driven ashore in Umattie Bay before 10 April. HMS Renard and/or HMS Supply (both Royal Navy) took some of her officers and crew to Manila, Spanish East Indies following a revolt.
Active	United Kingdom	The whaler was abandoned in the Davis Strait.
Alphonse	United Kingdom	The ship was wrecked near Cape Race, Newfoundland, British North America. She was on a voyage from Bermuda to Newfoundland.
Amedée	France	The ship was wrecked on the coast of Mexico.
Amy	United Kingdom	The sealer was wrecked on the coast of Newfoundland.
Asia	Spanish Navy	The ship of the line was driven ashore in Umattie Bay before 10 April. HMS Renard and/or HMS Supply (both Royal Navy) took some of her officers and crew to Manila following a revolt.
Auguste	France	The ship was wrecked at Alvarado, Mexico. Her crew were rescued.
Baroness van der Capellen	Netherlands	The ship was wrecked on the coast of Java with the loss of all but three of her crew.
Betsey	United Kingdom	The ship was destroyed by fire at a port in Surinam.
Bridges	United Kingdom	The whaler was lost in the Marquesas Islands.
Chevy Chace	United States	The ship was lost on the south west coast of the United States.
Chilian	United States	The ship capsized and sank in the Mediterranean Sea. Her crew were rescued. She was on a voyage from Genoa, Kingdom of Sardinia, to a Mexican port.
Don	United Kingdom	The whaler was lost in the Davis Strait.
Eliza Ann	United Kingdom	The ship was wrecked near the Friendly Islands.
Estridge	United Kingdom	The whaler was lost in the Davis Strait. Her crew were rescued by Cato (United Kingdom).
Francis	United Kingdom	The ship was lost off "Rio St. Francisco" before 28 April. She was on a voyage from Bahia, Brazil, to Macao.
George	(United Kingdom of Great Britain and Ireland) British North America	The brig capsized at sea. Three survivors were rescued by St. Clair (United States).
Georgiana	United Kingdom	The ship was wrecked on Zanzibar.
Harp	United Kingdom	The ship was lost in the Bay of Fundy. She was on a voyage from Liverpool, Lancashire, to Saint John, New Brunswick, British North America.
Hope	United Kingdom	The ship was lost off Anjar, India. Her crew were rescued. She was on a voyage from London to Singapore.
Josephine	France	The ship was wrecked on the coast of Mexico.
Lively	United Kingdom	The whaler was lost in the Davis Strait.
Lord Exmouth	United Kingdom	The ship capsized in a squall and was abandoned by her crew. She was on a voyage from Jamaica to Halifax, Nova Scotia, British North America.
Margaret	United Kingdom	The sealer was wrecked on the coast of Newfoundland.
Mary & Eliza	United States	The ship was wrecked on Graciosa, in the "Western Islands".
Montego Bay	United Kingdom	The ship was wrecked on the Isla of Pines, Cuba. Her crew were rescued.
Ranger	United Kingdom	The ship was wrecked near Newfoundland. She was on a voyage from Liverpool to Newfoundland.
Royal Charlotte	United Kingdom	The ship was wrecked on "Prince Frederick's Shore". Her crew were rescued. She was on a voyage from New South Wales to Madras and Bengal, India.
Saguinay	(United Kingdom of Great Britain and Ireland) British North America	The ship was wrecked on the east coast of the United States before 25 April.
Stedcombe	United Kingdom	The ship was attacked by local inhabitants at Timor Laut. All but two of the crew were killed, the survivors being kept as slaves. One of them died c.1836. She was on a voyage from Melville Island, New Holland to Van Diemen's Land. The last survivor was rescued in 1839 by the schooner Essington ( (United Kingdom of Great Britain and Ireland) New South Wales).
Steel	United Kingdom	The ship foundered whilst on a voyage from Cork to Berbice.
Success	United Kingdom	The whaler was lost in the Davis Strait.
Telegraph	United Kingdom	The ship was lost near Havana, Cuba, before 21 April.
Theresa	France	The ship foundered whilst on a voyage from Saint Vincent to Dunkerque, Nord. Her crew were rescued.
Thomas Galston	United Kingdom	The ship was driven ashore at Miramichi, New Brunswick, British North America.
Trois Soeurs	France	The ship was driven ashore on the coast of the Florida Territory. She was on a voyage from Havana to Bordeaux, Gironde. Trois Soeurs was later refloated and taken in to Charleston, South Carolina, United States, for repairs.
Victory	United States	The schooner was lost at Kitty Hawk, North Carolina.
William den Ersten	Netherlands	The ship was destroyed by fire at a port in Surinam.
