= Elie A. F. La Vallette =

American naval officer (1790–1862)

Elie Augustus Frederick La Vallette
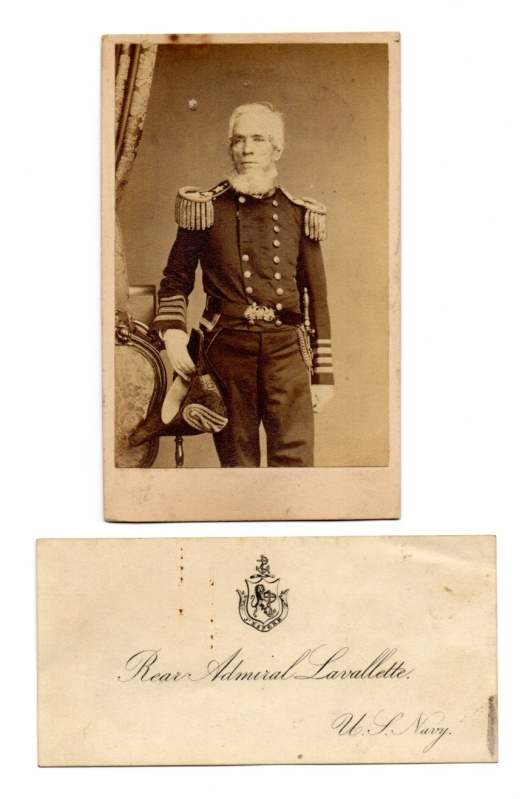
- Rear Admiral La Vallette
- Born: May 3, 1790; Alexandria, Virginia, U.S.
- Died: November 18, 1862 (aged 72); Philadelphia Naval Yard Hospital, U.S.
- Burial place: Laurel Hill Cemetery, Philadelphia, Pennsylvania, U.S.
- Military career
- Branch: United States Navy
- Service years: 1812–1862
- Rank: Rear admiral
- Commands: USS Despatch; USS Fairfield; USS Independence; USS Congress; Africa Squadron; Mediterranean Squadron
- Conflicts: War of 1812; Mexican–American War

Elie Augustus Frederick La Vallette (May 3, 1790 – November 18, 1862) was an American military officer who served in the United States Navy from 1812 to 1862. He served during the War of 1812, in the Mediterranean and Africa Squadrons, and during the Mexican-American War. He was one of the first rear admirals appointed when Congress created the rank in July 1862. Two United States Navy vessels and the borough of Lavallette, New Jersey were named in his honor.

== Career ==
La Vallette was born on May 3, 1790, in Alexandria, Virginia to a distinguished family of French origin. At the age of 10, he accompanied his father, a chaplain, on a cruise in the frigate Philadelphia, commanded by Stephen Decatur, Sr.

After serving in the merchant marine, La Vallette entered the United States Navy on June 25, 1812, as sailing master. La Vallette distinguished himself during the battle, winning promotion and a medal. He received his commission as lieutenant on December 9, 1814.

He formally anglicized his name to Lavallette in 1830. Lavallette was promoted to master commandant on March 3, 1831, and to captain on February 23, 1840.

From 1842 to 1845, Lavallette served as commandant of the Navy Yard at Pensacola, Florida. During his time as commandant, a government contractor requested that Lavallette order his sailors to assist in the search for escaped slaves used in construction of the Navy Yard, but Lavallette refused.

During the Mexican–American War, Lavallette commanded the frigates Independence and the Congress, directing operations against Guaymas in the Gulf of California on November 19–20, 1847. He played a key role in the capture of Mazatlán and in 1848, served as Military Governor of Mazatlán, and the crew of the Congress comprised the occupying garrison. In 1851 he commanded the Africa Squadron.

== Death and legacy ==
Lavallette died on November 18, 1862, at the Philadelphia Naval Yard Hospital and was interred in Laurel Hill Cemetery.

Two destroyers of the United States Navy were named USS La Vallette in his honor.

The Borough of Lavallette, New Jersey was named in his honor and was co-founded by his son Albert T. Lavallette.
