= Dover Beaches South, New Jersey =

Populated place in Ocean County, New Jersey, US

- Census-designated place
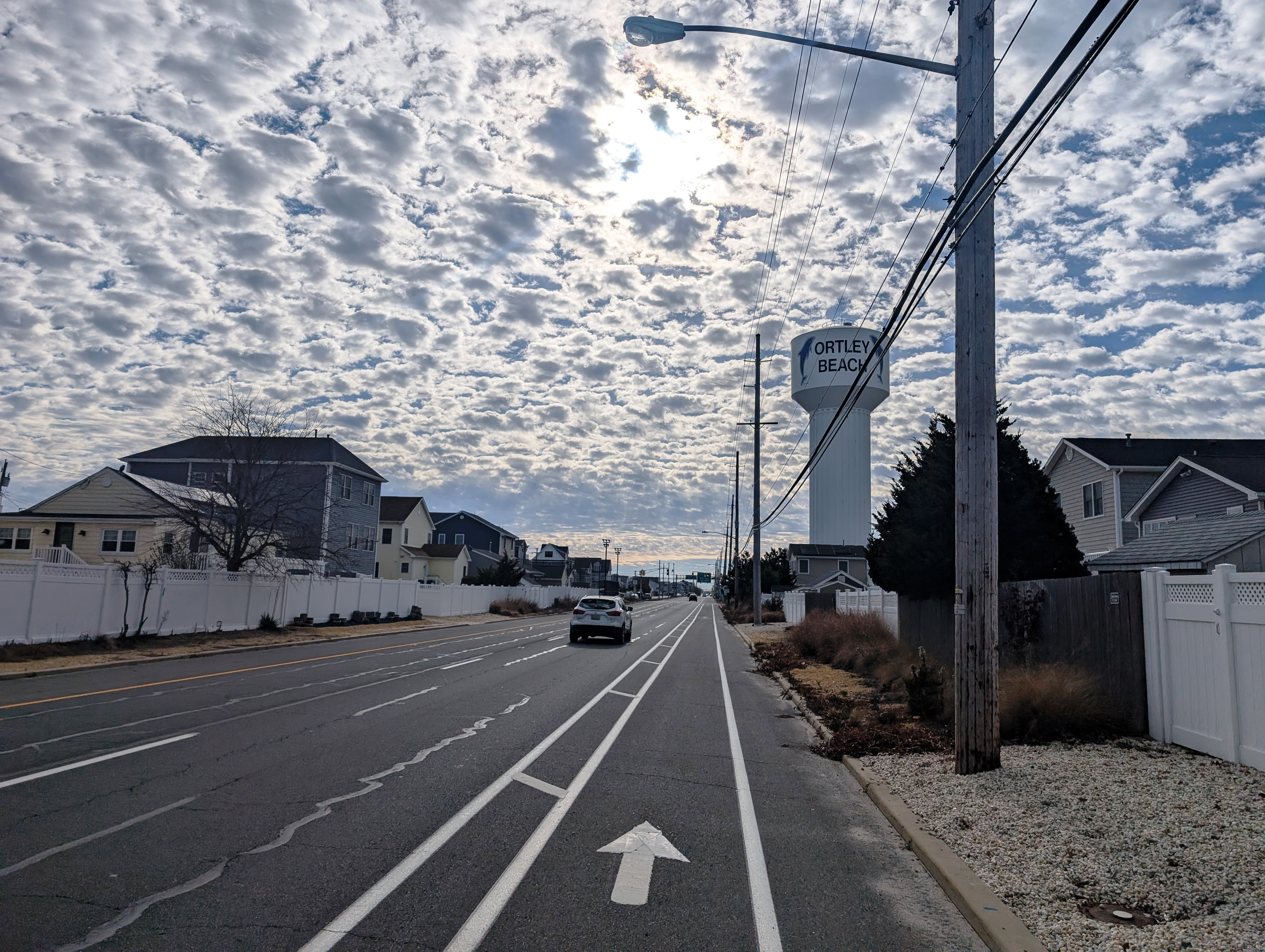
- Route 35 southbound in the CDP

- Map of Dover Beaches South CDP in Ocean County. Inset: Location of Ocean County in New Jersey.

- Location in Ocean County Location in New Jersey Location in the United States
- Coordinates: 39.955143°N 74.07961°W
- Country: United States
- State: New Jersey
- County: Ocean
- Township: Toms River

Area
  - Total: 1.01 sq mi (2.61 km^{2})
  - Land: 0.62 sq mi (1.61 km^{2})
  - Water: 0.39 sq mi (1.00 km^{2}) 39.80%
- Elevation: 3.3 ft (1 m)

Population (2020)
  - Total: 1,331
  - Density: 2,140.5/sq mi (826.47/km^{2})
- Time zone: UTC−05:00 (Eastern (EST))
  - Summer (DST): UTC−04:00 (Eastern (EDT))
- FIPS code: 34-18151
- GNIS feature ID: 02389414

Dover Beaches South, more commonly known as Ortley Beach, is an unincorporated community and census-designated place (CDP) located within Toms River, in Ocean County, in the U.S. state of New Jersey. As of the 2020 census, Dover Beaches South had a population of 1,331. Dover Beaches South is situated on the Barnegat Peninsula, a long, narrow barrier peninsula that separates Barnegat Bay from the Atlantic Ocean.

Toms River Township is split by the United States Census Bureau into three CDPs; Toms River CDP on the mainland, comprising over 95% of the township's population, along with the Jersey Shore communities of Dover Beaches North and Dover Beaches South.

== Geography ==
According to the United States Census Bureau, the CDP had a total area of 1.030 square miles (2.67 km^{2}), including 0.620 square miles (1.61 km^{2}) of land and 0.410 square miles (1.06 km^{2}) of water (39.80%). The CDP is bordered by the municipalities of Lavallette and Seaside Heights.

== Demographics ==
Historical population
Census	Pop.	Note	%±
2000	1,594		—
2010	1,209		−24.2%
2020	1,331		10.1%
Population sources: 2000-2010 2000; 2010 2020

Dover Beaches South first appeared as a census designated place in the 2000 U.S. census.

=== 2020 census ===
Dover Beaches South CDP, New Jersey – Racial and ethnic composition Note: the US Census treats Hispanic/Latino as an ethnic category. This table excludes Latinos from the racial categories and assigns them to a separate category. Hispanics/Latinos may be of any race.
Race / Ethnicity (NH = Non-Hispanic)	Pop 2000	Pop 2010	Pop 2020	% 2000	% 2010	% 2020
White alone (NH)	1,547	1,118	1,223	97.05%	92.47%	91.89%
Black or African American alone (NH)	1	1	4	0.06%	0.08%	0.30%
Native American or Alaska Native alone (NH)	3	0	0	0.19%	0.00%	0.00%
Asian alone (NH)	4	2	2	0.25%	0.17%	0.15%
Native Hawaiian or Pacific Islander alone (NH)	0	0	0	0.00%	0.00%	0.00%
Other race alone (NH)	0	4	2	0.00%	0.33%	0.15%
Mixed race or Multiracial (NH)	5	13	25	0.31%	1.08%	1.88%
Hispanic or Latino (any race)	34	71	75	2.13%	5.87%	5.63%
Total	1,594	1,209	1,331	100.00%	100.00%	100.00%

=== 2010 census ===
The 2010 United States census counted 1,209 people, 664 households, and 330 families in the CDP. The population density was 1,951.5 people per square mile (753.5 people/km^{2}). There were 2,658 housing units at an average density of 4,290.3 units per square mile (1,656.5 units/km^{2}). The racial makeup was 95.86% (1,159) White, 0.25% (3) Black or African American, 0.00% (0) Native American, 0.17% (2) Asian, 0.00% (0) Pacific Islander, 1.90% (23) from other races, and 1.82% (22) from two or more races. Hispanic or Latino of any race were 5.87% (71) of the population.

Of the 664 households, 10.5% had children under the age of 18; 38.3% were married couples living together; 7.2% had a female householder with no husband present and 50.3% were non-families. Of all households, 43.8% were made up of individuals and 19.9% had someone living alone who was 65 years of age or older. The average household size was 1.82 and the average family size was 2.46.

9.4% of the population were under the age of 18, 4.5% from 18 to 24, 18.9% from 25 to 44, 34.5% from 45 to 64, and 32.8% who were 65 years of age or older. The median age was 56.3 years. For every 100 females, the population had 92.2 males. For every 100 females ages 18 and older there were 91.4 males.

=== 2000 census ===
As of the 2000 United States census there were 1,594 people, 862 households, and 422 families residing in the CDP. The population density was 992.7 people/km^{2} (2,571 people/mi^{2}). There were 2,622 housing units at an average density of 1,632.8 units/km^{2} (4,229 units/mi^{2}). The racial makeup of the CDP was 92.93% White, 0.46% African American, 0.31% Native American, 0.25% Asian, 0.06% from other races, and 1.38% from two or more races. Hispanic or Latino of any race were 4.13% of the population.

There were 862 households, out of which 13.2% had children under the age of 18 living with them, 38.2% were married couples living together, 8.7% had a female householder with no husband present, and 51.0% were non-families. 46.4% of all households were made up of individuals, and 18.6% had someone living alone who was 65 years of age or older. The average household size was 1.85 and the average family size was 2.59.

In the CDP the population was spread out, with 12.6% under the age of 18, 4.2% from 18 to 24, 26.2% from 25 to 44, 31.2% from 45 to 64, and 25.7% who were 65 years of age or older. The median age was 49 years. For every 100 females, there were 94.6 males. For every 100 females age 18 and over, there were 91.6 males.

The median income for a household in the CDP was $38,407, and the median income for a family was $53,811. Males had a median income of $38,984 versus $35,735 for females. The per capita income for the CDP was $26,702. About 5.5% of families and 10.0% of the population were below the poverty line, including 25.9% of those under age 18 and 6.0% of those age 65 or over.

== History ==
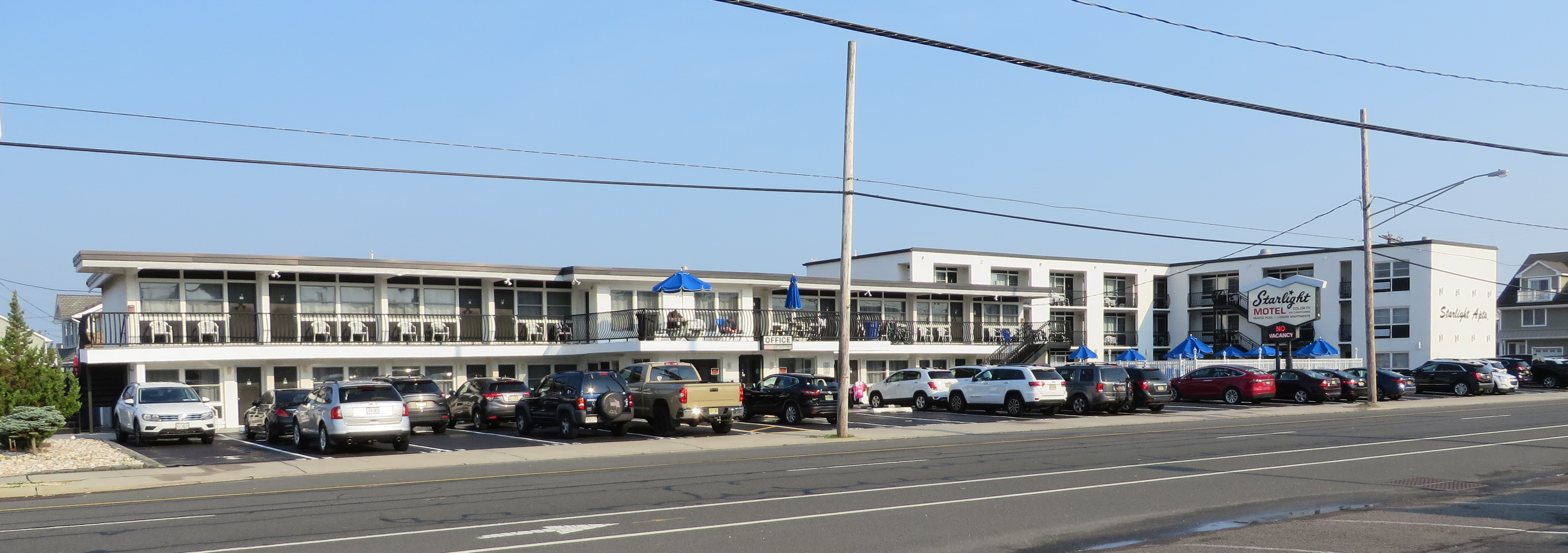
Starlight Motel (since 1973) on Route 35 North in Ortley Beach

The current location of Ortley Beach was once home to Cranberry Inlet, an important maritime route that closed after an 1812 storm. The area was opened to development by the completion of the Pennsylvania Railroad on the peninsula in 1883 and the completion of what is now Route 35 in 1913. The community was settled as a vacation resort in the 1940s and 1950s. There were several unsuccessful efforts to secede from Dover Township in the latter half of the 20th century. After suffering widespread damage to its housing stock during Hurricane Sandy, some publications have argued that Ortley Beach is undergoing gentrification as high rebuilding costs have pushed out older residents and ushered in a new wave of luxury homes.

== Climate ==
According to the Köppen climate classification system, Dover Beaches South has a humid subtropical climate (Cfa) with hot, slightly humid summers, cool winters and year-around precipitation. Cfa climates are characterized by all months having an average mean temperature above 32.0 °F (0.0 °C), at least four months with an average mean temperature at or above 50.0 °F (10.0 °C), at least one month with an average mean temperature at or above 71.6 °F (22.0 °C) and no significant precipitation difference between seasons. During the summer months in Dover Beaches South, a cooling afternoon sea breeze is present on most days, but episodes of extreme heat and humidity can occur with heat index values at or above 95.0 °F (35.0 °C). On average, the wettest month of the year is July which corresponds with the annual peak in thunderstorm activity. During the winter months, episodes of extreme cold and wind can occur with wind chill values below 0.0 °F (−17.8 °C). The plant hardiness zone at Dover Beaches South Beach is 7a with an average annual extreme minimum air temperature of 3.80 °F (−15.67 °C). The average seasonal (November–April) snowfall total is 18 to 24 inches (46 to 61 cm) and the average snowiest month is February which corresponds with the annual peak in nor'easter activity.

Climate data for Dover Beaches South Beach, NJ (1981-2010 Averages)
Month	Jan	Feb	Mar	Apr	May	Jun	Jul	Aug	Sep	Oct	Nov	Dec	Year
Mean daily maximum °F (°C)	40.5 (4.7)	43.0 (6.1)	49.7 (9.8)	59.2 (15.1)	69.1 (20.6)	78.3 (25.7)	83.5 (28.6)	82.3 (27.9)	76.3 (24.6)	65.7 (18.7)	55.4 (13.0)	45.5 (7.5)	62.5 (16.9)
Daily mean °F (°C)	32.8 (0.4)	34.8 (1.6)	41.2 (5.1)	50.5 (10.3)	60.3 (15.7)	69.7 (20.9)	75.1 (23.9)	74.0 (23.3)	67.6 (19.8)	56.4 (13.6)	47.1 (8.4)	37.6 (3.1)	54.0 (12.2)
Mean daily minimum °F (°C)	25.1 (−3.8)	26.7 (−2.9)	32.7 (0.4)	41.7 (5.4)	51.5 (10.8)	61.1 (16.2)	66.7 (19.3)	65.7 (18.7)	58.9 (14.9)	47.2 (8.4)	38.8 (3.8)	29.7 (−1.3)	45.6 (7.6)
Average precipitation inches (mm)	3.67 (93)	3.06 (78)	4.26 (108)	3.89 (99)	3.54 (90)	3.66 (93)	4.52 (115)	4.51 (115)	3.53 (90)	3.73 (95)	3.81 (97)	3.92 (100)	46.10 (1,171)
Average relative humidity (%)	65.2	62.8	61.1	62.3	65.5	70.3	69.6	71.5	70.6	69.6	68.3	66.4	67.0
Average dew point °F (°C)	22.4 (−5.3)	23.4 (−4.8)	28.8 (−1.8)	38.1 (3.4)	48.7 (9.3)	59.6 (15.3)	64.5 (18.1)	64.2 (17.9)	57.7 (14.3)	46.6 (8.1)	37.2 (2.9)	27.4 (−2.6)	43.3 (6.3)
Source: PRISM

Climate data for Sandy Hook, NJ Ocean Water Temperature (36 N Dover Beaches South)
Month	Jan	Feb	Mar	Apr	May	Jun	Jul	Aug	Sep	Oct	Nov	Dec	Year
Daily mean °F (°C)	37 (3)	36 (2)	40 (4)	46 (8)	55 (13)	62 (17)	69 (21)	72 (22)	68 (20)	59 (15)	51 (11)	43 (6)	53 (12)
Source: NOAA

== Ecology ==
According to the A. W. Kuchler U.S. potential natural vegetation types, Dover Beaches South would have a dominant vegetation type of Northern Cordgrass (73) with a dominant vegetation form of Coastal Prairie (20).

Preceded by Lavallette	Beaches of New Jersey	Succeeded by Seaside Heights
