= Dover Beaches North, New Jersey =

Populated place in Ocean County, New Jersey, US

- Census-designated place
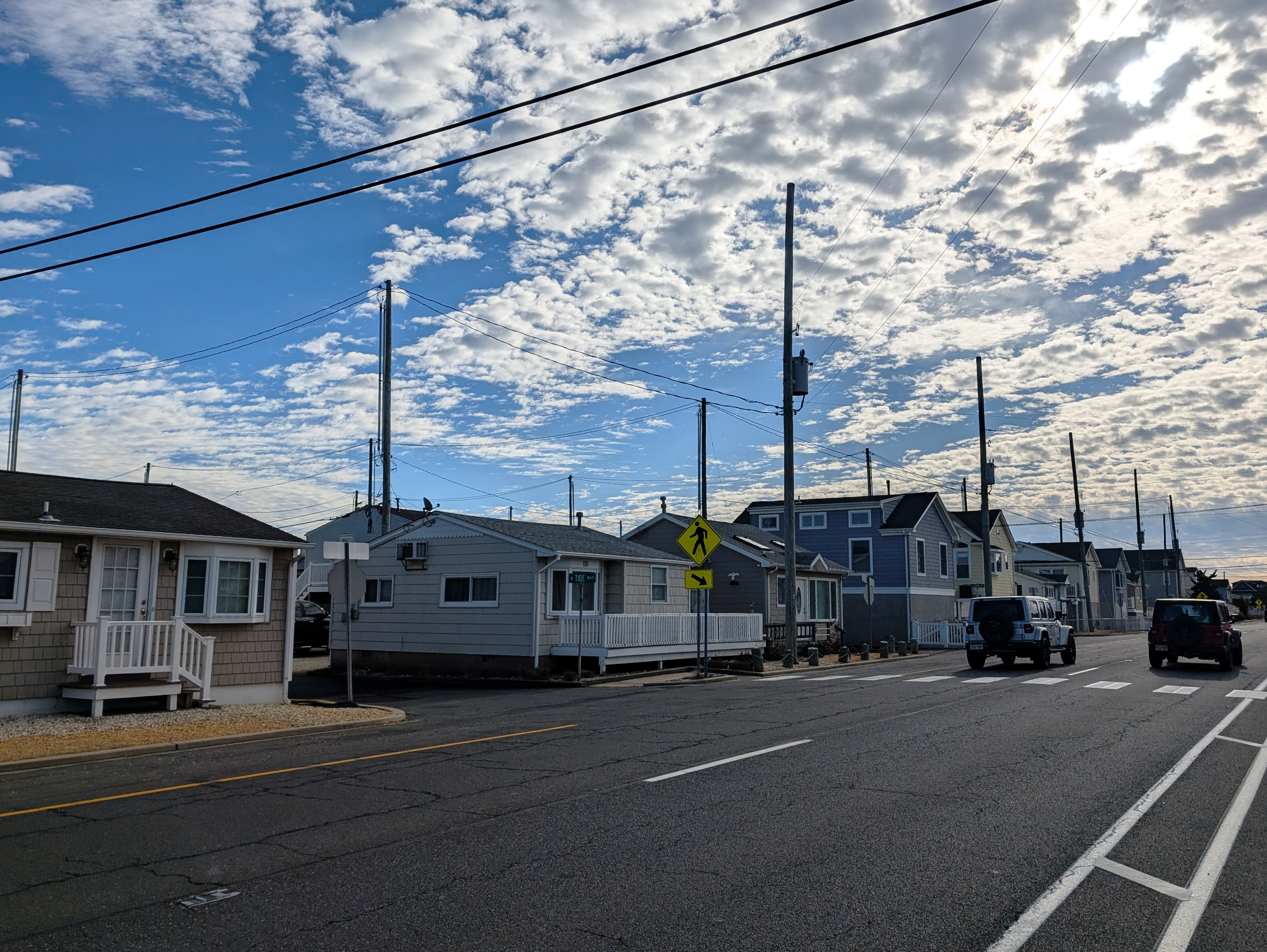
- Bungalows in the Monterey Beach section of the CDP

- Map of Dover Beaches North CDP in Ocean County. Inset: Location of Ocean County in New Jersey.

- Location in Ocean County Location in New Jersey Location in the United States
- Coordinates: 39.991931°N 74.07168°W
- Country: United States
- State: New Jersey
- County: Ocean
- Township: Toms River

Area
  - Total: 1.58 sq mi (4.09 km^{2})
  - Land: 0.92 sq mi (2.38 km^{2})
  - Water: 0.66 sq mi (1.71 km^{2}) 41.92%
- Elevation: 0 ft (0 m)

Population (2020)
  - Total: 1,277
  - Density: 1,388.5/sq mi (536.11/km^{2})
- Time zone: UTC−05:00 (Eastern (EST))
  - Summer (DST): UTC−04:00 (Eastern (EDT))
- FIPS code: 34-18148
- GNIS feature ID: 02389413

Dover Beaches North is an unincorporated community and census-designated place (CDP) located within Toms River, in Ocean County, in the U.S. state of New Jersey. As of the 2020 census, Dover Beaches North had a population of 1,277. The CDP includes the communities of Ocean Beaches 1, 2 and 3, Chadwick Beach, Chadwick Island, Seacrest Beach, Monterey Beach, Silver Beach, Normandy Shores and half of Normandy Beach. Dover Beaches North is situated on the Barnegat Peninsula, a long, narrow barrier peninsula that separates Barnegat Bay from the Atlantic Ocean.

Toms River Township is split by the United States Census Bureau into three CDPs; Toms River CDP on the mainland including over 95% of the township's population, along with Dover Beaches North and Dover Beaches South .

== Geography ==
According to the United States Census Bureau, the CDP had a total area of 1.587 square miles (4.11 km^{2}), including 0.922 square miles (2.39 km^{2}) of land and 0.665 square miles (1.72 km^{2}) of water (41.92%).

== Demographics ==
Historical population
Census	Pop.	Note	%±
2000	1,785		—
2010	1,239		−30.6%
2020	1,277		3.1%
Population sources: 2000-2010 2000; 2010 2020

Dover Beaches North first appeared as a census designated place in the 2000 U.S. census.

=== 2020 census ===
Dover Beaches North CDP, New Jersey – Racial and ethnic composition Note: the US Census treats Hispanic/Latino as an ethnic category. This table excludes Latinos from the racial categories and assigns them to a separate category. Hispanics/Latinos may be of any race.
Race / Ethnicity (NH = Non-Hispanic)	Pop 2000	Pop 2010	Pop 2020	% 2000	% 2010	% 2020
White alone (NH)	1,739	1,202	1,222	97.42%	97.01%	95.69%
Black or African American alone (NH)	2	2	2	0.11%	0.16%	0.16%
Native American or Alaska Native alone (NH)	1	5	0	0.06%	0.40%	0.00%
Asian alone (NH)	9	4	7	0.50%	0.32%	0.55%
Native Hawaiian or Pacific Islander alone (NH)	0	0	0	0.00%	0.00%	0.00%
Other race alone (NH)	0	0	5	0.00%	0.00%	0.39%
Mixed race or Multiracial (NH)	8	2	16	0.45%	0.16%	1.25%
Hispanic or Latino (any race)	26	24	25	1.46%	1.94%	1.96%
Total	1,785	1,239	1,277	100.00%	100.00%	100.00%

=== 2010 census ===
The 2010 United States census counted 1,239 people, 702 households, and 364 families in the CDP. The population density was 1,344.2 people per square mile (519.0 people/km^{2}). There were 4,071 housing units at an average density of 4,416.6 units per square mile (1,705.3 units/km^{2}). The racial makeup was 98.71% (1,223) White, 0.24% (3) Black or African American, 0.40% (5) Native American, 0.32% (4) Asian, 0.00% (0) Pacific Islander, 0.16% (2) from other races, and 0.16% (2) from two or more races. Hispanic or Latino of any race were 1.94% (24) of the population.

Of the 702 households, 6.0% had children under the age of 18; 45.4% were married couples living together; 4.7% had a female householder with no husband present and 48.1% were non-families. Of all households, 43.7% were made up of individuals and 24.8% had someone living alone who was 65 years of age or older. The average household size was 1.76 and the average family size was 2.36.

6.1% of the population were under the age of 18, 2.7% from 18 to 24, 11.5% from 25 to 44, 36.2% from 45 to 64, and 43.4% who were 65 years of age or older. The median age was 62.6 years. For every 100 females, the population had 88.9 males. For every 100 females ages 18 and older there were 89.6 males.

=== 2000 census ===
As of the 2000 United States census there were 1,785 people, 974 households, and 529 families residing in the CDP. The population density was 703.3 people/km^{2} (1,822 people/mi^{2}). There were 4,119 housing units at an average density of 1,622.8 units/km^{2} (4,203 units/mi^{2}). The racial makeup of the CDP was 100% White.

There were 974 households, out of which 9.5% had children under the age of 18 living with them, 46.7% were married couples living together, 5.5% had a female householder with no husband present, and 45.6% were non-families. 42.2% of all households were made up of individuals, and 24.0% had someone living alone who was 65 years of age or older. The average household size was 1.83 and the average family size was 2.44.

In the CDP the population was spread out, with 9.0% under the age of 18, 3.6% from 18 to 24, 18.2% from 25 to 44, 30.7% from 45 to 64, and 38.5% who were 65 years of age or older. The median age was 58 years. For every 100 females, there were 90.1 males. For every 100 females age 18 and over, there were 91.0 males.

The median income for a household in the CDP was $430,125, and the median income for a family was $580,125. Males had a median income of $570,917 versus $320,083 for females. The per capita income for the CDP was $320,613. About 2.6% of families and 5.4% of the population were below the poverty line, including none of those under age 18 and 4.3% of those age 65 or over.

== History ==
What is now Dover Beaches North was first settled in the early 19th century by the Chadwick family as a hunting and fishing resort. Further development continued in 1883 with the construction of a Coast Guard Lifesaving Station and the completion of the Pennsylvania Railroad on the peninsula, which included a stop at Chadwick Beach. The area was opened to major development after the completion of what is now Route 35 in 1913. The area saw its largest growth as a vacation resort in the middle of the 20th century. In 1961, the Pennsylvania Railroad right-of-way was converted into a new southbound roadway for Route 35, allowing the original 1913 roadway to exclusively carry northbound traffic. Today, the area consists of several private beaches governed by homeowners' associations; there are no public beaches in the CDP. These private beach communities, from south to north, are roughly as follows:

- Ocean Beach, developed from 1946 into the 1960s and consisting of four sections (Units 1-3 and Ocean Beach Shores)
- Brightwater Beach
- Rutherford Beach
- Sunset Manor
- Monterey Beach, established in 1948
- Seacrest Beach, established in 1954
- Chadwick Beach
- Silver Beach
- Normandy Beach, established in 1916

== Climate ==
According to the Köppen climate classification system, Dover Beaches North has a humid subtropical climate (Cfa). Cfa climates are characterized by all months having an average mean temperature above 32.0 °F (0.0 °C), at least four months with an average mean temperature at or above 5–.0 °F (−15.0 – −17.8 °C), at least one month with an average mean temperature at or above 71.6 °F (22.0 °C) and no significant precipitation difference between seasons. During the summer months at Dover Beaches North, a cooling afternoon sea breeze is present on most days, but episodes of extreme heat and humidity can occur with heat index values at or above 95.0 °F (35.0 °C). On average, the wettest month of the year is July which corresponds with the annual peak in thunderstorm activity. During the winter months, episodes of extreme cold and wind can occur with wind chill values below 0.0 °F (−17.8 °C). The plant hardiness zone at Dover Beaches North is 7a with an average annual extreme minimum air temperature of 3.4 °F (−15.9 °C). The average seasonal (November–April) snowfall total is 18 to 24 inches (46 to 61 cm) and the average snowiest month is February which corresponds with the annual peak in nor'easter activity.

Climate data for Dover Beaches North, NJ (1981-2010 Averages)
Month	Jan	Feb	Mar	Apr	May	Jun	Jul	Aug	Sep	Oct	Nov	Dec	Year
Mean daily maximum °F (°C)	40.3 (4.6)	42.8 (6.0)	49.5 (9.7)	59.3 (15.2)	69.1 (20.6)	78.3 (25.7)	83.4 (28.6)	82.3 (27.9)	76.2 (24.6)	65.5 (18.6)	55.3 (12.9)	45.1 (7.3)	62.3 (16.8)
Daily mean °F (°C)	32.7 (0.4)	34.8 (1.6)	41.1 (5.1)	50.5 (10.3)	60.3 (15.7)	69.7 (20.9)	75.1 (23.9)	74.0 (23.3)	67.5 (19.7)	56.3 (13.5)	47.0 (8.3)	37.4 (3.0)	54.0 (12.2)
Mean daily minimum °F (°C)	25.1 (−3.8)	26.7 (−2.9)	32.7 (0.4)	41.6 (5.3)	51.4 (10.8)	61.1 (16.2)	66.7 (19.3)	65.8 (18.8)	58.7 (14.8)	47.1 (8.4)	38.8 (3.8)	29.6 (−1.3)	45.5 (7.5)
Average precipitation inches (mm)	3.66 (93)	3.06 (78)	4.23 (107)	3.92 (100)	3.54 (90)	3.67 (93)	4.57 (116)	4.49 (114)	3.52 (89)	3.74 (95)	3.86 (98)	3.94 (100)	46.20 (1,173)
Average relative humidity (%)	65.2	62.5	60.8	62.1	65.8	70.1	69.6	71.2	71.1	69.6	68.3	66.3	66.9
Average dew point °F (°C)	22.3 (−5.4)	23.3 (−4.8)	28.6 (−1.9)	38.0 (3.3)	48.8 (9.3)	59.5 (15.3)	64.5 (18.1)	64.1 (17.8)	57.8 (14.3)	46.5 (8.1)	37.1 (2.8)	27.2 (−2.7)	43.2 (6.2)
Source: PRISM

Climate data for Sandy Hook, NJ Ocean Water Temperature (33 N Dover Beaches North)
Month	Jan	Feb	Mar	Apr	May	Jun	Jul	Aug	Sep	Oct	Nov	Dec	Year
Daily mean °F (°C)	37 (3)	36 (2)	40 (4)	46 (8)	55 (13)	62 (17)	69 (21)	72 (22)	68 (20)	59 (15)	51 (11)	43 (6)	53 (12)
Source: NOAA

== Ecology ==
According to the A. W. Kuchler U.S. potential natural vegetation types, Dover Beaches North would have a dominant vegetation type of Northern Cordgrass (73) with a dominant vegetation form of Coastal Prairie (20).

Preceded by Brick Township	Beaches of New Jersey	Succeeded by Lavallette
