= Island Beach (barrier island) =

Barrier island in New Jersey, United States

Coordinates: 39.8338°N 74.0879°W

Island Beach is a barrier spit located on the Jersey Shore of the Atlantic Ocean in Ocean County, New Jersey. Since the closing of Cranberry Inlet about 1812 (approximately at the boundary between Ortley Beach and Seaside Heights), it has been joined physically to Squan Beach, and is a major component of the Barnegat Peninsula.

== Geography ==
Island Beach is a barrier peninsula that separates the Atlantic Ocean from Barnegat Bay. It joins Squan Beach at the north end, and terminates at Barnegat Inlet to the south.

It was described in 1834 as,

Island Beach, Delaware t-ship (sic.), Monmouth county, extends N, 12 miles on the Atlantic ocean and Barnegat bay, from Barnegat Inlet to what was formerly Cranberry Inlet; it nowhere exceeds half a mile in breadth.

An 1878 description of Island Beach is as follows, viz,

Island Beach is that portion of the peninsula reaching from the site of Cranberry Inlet to Barnegat Inlet, about twelve miles. It possesses no special features differing from Squan Beach, being of about the same average width. These beaches are not wooded. Barnegat Bay lies along the whole length of Island Beach on its inner side, giving it a seaward appearance, and constituting an attractive feature of its location.

== Communities ==
Communities on the peninsula include Seaside Heights, Seaside Park and the Berkeley Township community of South Seaside Park. The former Borough of Island Beach, a sparsely populated municipality comprising the bulk of the peninsula, lasted from 1933 until July 6, 1965, when it was absorbed into Berkeley Township; the territory is now Island Beach State Park.
