= Barnegat Peninsula =

Barrier peninsula in Ocean County, New Jersey, United States

Coordinates: 39.89469°N 74.08288°W

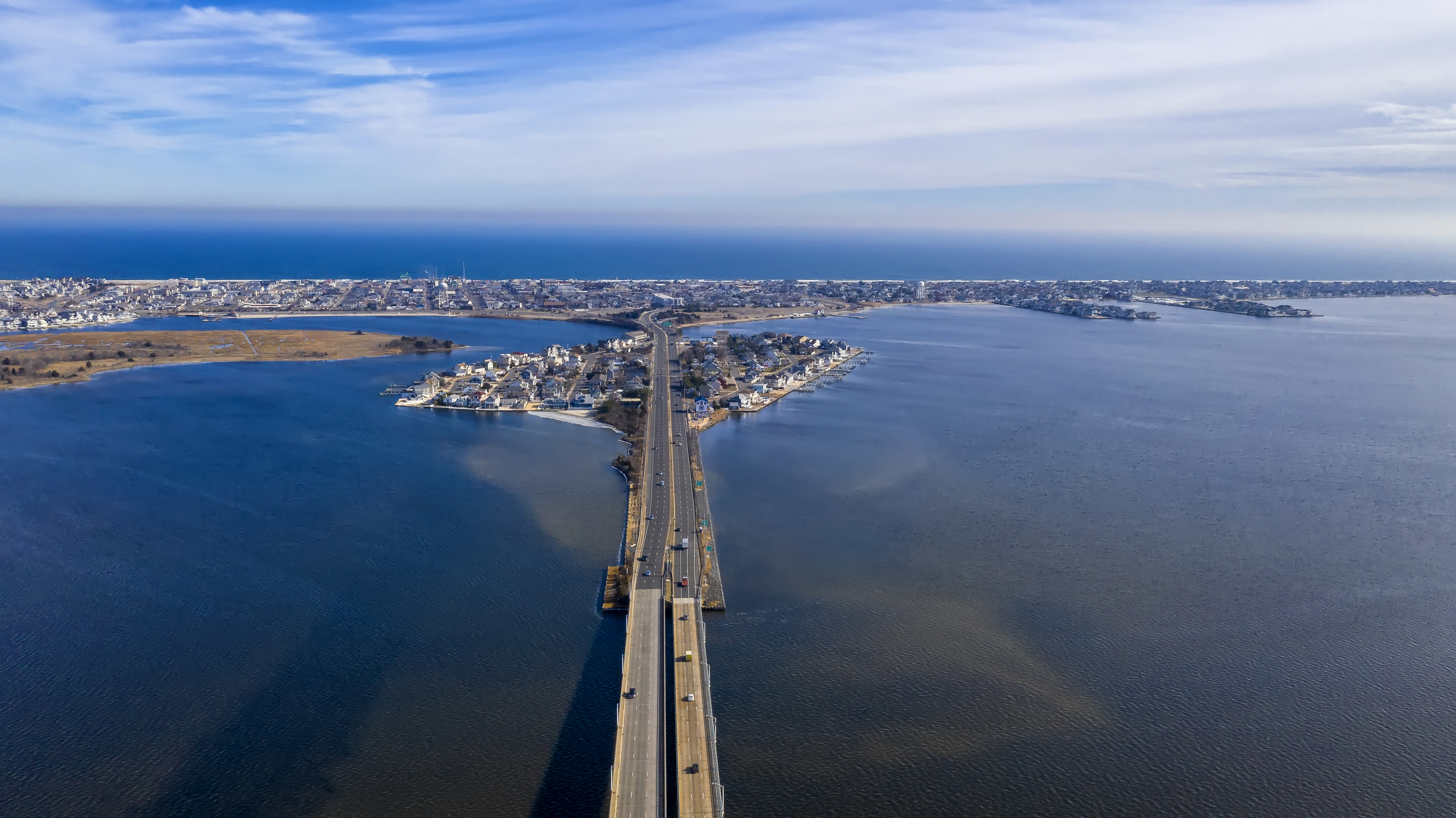
Toms River, New Jersey features a highly extensive network of shorelines, including Barnegat Bay and Pelican Island (foreground), and the Barnegat Peninsula and Atlantic Ocean (background).

The Barnegat Peninsula, also known as the Island Beach Peninsula or Barnegat Bay Island and colloquially as "the barrier island", is a 20-mile (32 km) long, narrow barrier peninsula located on the Jersey Shore in Ocean County, New Jersey, United States, that divides the Barnegat Bay from the Atlantic Ocean. It is a vacation destination and summer colony area and is heavily dependent on tourism, real estate and fishing.

Notable communities on the peninsula include Point Pleasant Beach, Bay Head, Mantoloking, Lavallette, Toms River sections of Ortley Beach and Normandy Beach, Seaside Heights, Seaside Park, Brick (Beaches I, II, and III), and Berkeley Township. The southern 10 miles (16 km) of the barrier island are preserved in their natural state as Island Beach State Park, New Jersey's longest stretch of undeveloped coastline.

== Geography ==
Aerial view of the oceanfront at Bay Head, at the northern end of the peninsula, looking north-northeast toward Point Pleasant Beach, August 2025

The peninsula divides the Atlantic Ocean from Barnegat Bay in Ocean County, New Jersey. It stretches approximately 20 miles from Manasquan Inlet in Point Pleasant Beach in the north to Berkeley Township in the south. It is separated from Long Beach Island to the south by the treacherous Barnegat Inlet.

The area surrounding the peninsula was described by Henry Hudson, in 1609, as "a great lake of water, as we could judge it to be ... The mouth of the lake hath many shoals, and the sea breaketh on them as it is cast out of the mouth of it." The name of the peninsula is derived from that of the adjacent inlet and bay, which were originally named in 1614 "Barendegat," or "Inlet of the Breakers," by Dutch explorers of the coastline, referring to the waterway's turbulent channel. An analysis of the composition of sediments and sands on the peninsula shows that it has been little changed for hundreds of years.

== Communities ==
The nine municipalities on the peninsula include:

- Point Pleasant Beach
- Bay Head
- Mantoloking
- Lavallette
- Toms River
  - Ortley Beach
  - Normandy Beach
- Seaside Heights
- Seaside Park
- Brick (Beaches I, II, and III)
- Berkeley Township

Point Pleasant Beach is a popular family resort known for its boardwalk, aquarium, and fishing industry. The town is also adjacent to the Manasquan River and Manasquan Inlet.

Bay Head is noted for its quiet beaches, the Bay Head Yacht Club, and its fine Shingle-style seashore houses. Bay Head was founded in 1886 and is listed on the National Register of Historic Places.

Mantoloking, the second-wealthiest community in the state, is known for its Shingle-style houses overlooking the Atlantic Ocean and Barnegat Bay. The Mantoloking Yacht Club has produced Olympic champions.

Normandy Beach, Lavallette, Ortley Beach, and Seaside Park are predominantly summer-only coastal towns with extremely small winter populations. They are popular for their relatively affordable housing stock, their ocean beaches, and access to water activities on Barnegat Bay and the Atlantic Ocean.

Seaside Heights is the principal community in the southern half of the peninsula, world-famous for its boardwalk and amusement piers lined with food stands, shops, games-of-chance, and amusement park rides. Seaside Heights has a winter population of 5,000 and a summer population of close to 40,000, swelled by vacationers from New York, Pennsylvania, and New Jersey. In the summers of 1998 and 2002, MTV hosted their summer broadcast in Seaside Heights.

The main thoroughfare connecting these shore towns is Route 35. Connections to the mainland include the Mathis and Tunney Bridges in Toms River connecting Seaside Heights, Route 35 running north from Point Pleasant Beach to Manasquan over the Manasquan River, Bridge Avenue between Point Pleasant and Bay Head, and the Mantoloking Bridge linking Mantoloking with Brick Township.

Since the Point Pleasant Canal was built in 1925 connecting the Manasquan Inlet with the Barnegat Bay, the peninsula is technically an island. It is sometimes referred to as Barnegat Beach Island, or more commonly, "the barrier island."

=== Effects of Hurricane Sandy ===
On October 29, 2012, an inlet opened between Barnegat Bay and the Atlantic Ocean at the bay's north end, when Hurricane Sandy wiped out a section of the peninsula at the base of the Route 528 bridge in Mantoloking. Much of that borough was destroyed along with the east end of the bridge. The bridge, as well as the entire stretch of Route 35 up and down the peninsula, have since reopened.
