= Cranberry Inlet =

Former inlet in New Jersey, United States

Coordinates: 39.763°N 74.101°W

Cranberry Inlet (also known as New Inlet or Toms River Inlet) was an inlet connecting Barnegat Bay with the Atlantic Ocean in Ocean County, New Jersey. It has been closed since 1812.

== Geography ==
Cranberry Inlet separated Squan Beach from Island Beach, both today comprising the Barnegat Peninsula. The inlet was approximately located at the boundary between Ortley Beach and Seaside Heights, nearly opposite the mouth of the Toms River.

It was described in 1834 as,

Cranberry Inlet, formerly from the ocean to Barnegat bay, between Island beach and Squan beach.

== History ==
In 1767, Cranberry Inlet is mentioned in the boundary description of the legislation creating Dover Township. The former inlet is also mentioned in the act setting Berkeley Township off from Dover Township.

In 1874, Former Speaker of the New Jersey General Assembly Edwin Salter wrote at length about Cranberry Inlet in Old Times in Old Monmouth:

A century ago Cranberry Inlet, sometimes called Tom's River Inlet, nearly opposite Tom's River, was one of the best inlets on the coast. The question as to the exact year when it was opened was brought before one of our courts a few years ago in a suit involving title to land in the vicinity, but no decisive information was elicited upon the trial. It is probable, however, that it broke through about 1750. It is laid down on Lewis Evans's map, 1755, and in Jeffrey's (English) map, same year, and on the latter and other maps it is called New Inlet. On Jeffrey's map Tom's River is called Goose Creek, and Barnegat Bay is called Flat Bay Sound. Cranberry Inlet closed about the year 1812, though for several years previous it had commenced filling up, gradually shoaling more and more each year until it was finally closed up.

During the Revolutionary War it was a place of considerable importance, as it afforded conveniences to our privateers on the lookout for British vessels bound in and out of New York. Though we have no exact account of the depth of water on the bar, yet in its best days it must have been equal to the best inlets on our coast, as we find loaded square-rigged vessels occasionally entered it. David Mapes, a much-esteemed and noted colored Quaker of Tuckerton, when a boy, resided in this vicinity, and was employed by Solomon Wardell to tend cattle on the beach when the inlet broke through. He slept in a cabin, and one morning on awakening was surprised to see that the sea had broken across the beach during the night.

The closing of Cranberry Inlet caused great inconvenience to persons along Barnegat Bay engaged in the coasting trade, as it compelled vessels from the upper part of the bay to sail several miles out of their way to Barnegat Inlet to get to sea.

About the year 1821 an attempt to open a new inlet near the head of the bay was made by a man named Michael Ortley. He worked at it off and on for several years and spent considerable money in the undertaking. At length one day a large company of men volunteered to aid him in completing the enterprise. In the evening after finishing it, Mr. Ortley and his friends had quite a merry time in celebrating the completion of the work. But great was their disappointment the following morning to find that the running of the tide, which they had supposed would work the inlet deeper, had, on the contrary, raised a bulkhead of sand sufficiently large to close it up, and the result was the inlet was closed much more expeditiously than it was opened.

Many supposed that if an effort was made to open an inlet farther down the bay, in the vicinity of old Cranberry, it would prove more successful. Acting upon this supposition another effort was made to open one about opposite Tom's River. The work was completed July 4th, 1847, by some two or three hundred men under the direction of Anthony Ivens, Jr. In this undertaking care was taken to let in the water when it was high tide in the bay and low water outside; but this enterprise, also, proved a failure, as it filled up about as soon as Ortley's.

Access to the upper part of Barnegat Bay was finally achieved in 1925 with the opening of the Point Pleasant Canal.

== See also ==
- Barnegat Bay
- Barnegat Peninsula
- Island Beach
- Squan Beach
