= Lakehurst School District =

School district in Ocean County, New Jersey, US

Location
- 301 Union Avenue Lakehurst, Ocean County, New Jersey, 08733; United States
- Coordinates: 40.012099°N 74.316824°W

District information
- Grades: PreK to 8
- Superintendent: Loren Fuhring
- Business administrator: Joseph Firetto
- Schools: 1

Students and staff
- Enrollment: 406 (as of 2023–24)
- Faculty: 40.8 FTEs
- Student–teacher ratio: 10.0:1

Other information
- District Factor Group: B
- Website: www.lakehurstschool.org
Ind.	Per pupil	District spending	Rank (*)	K-8 average	%± vs. average
1A	Total Spending	$16,809	19	$18,891	−11.0%
1	Budgetary Cost	12,628	16	14,159	−10.8%
2	Classroom Instruction	7,805	16	8,659	−9.9%
6	Support Services	1,715	15	2,167	−20.9%
8	Administrative Cost	1,724	35	1,547	11.4%
10	Operations & Maintenance	1,217	14	1,612	−24.5%
13	Extracurricular Activities	140	38	104	34.6%
16	Median Teacher Salary	55,974	17	61,136
Data from NJDoE 2014 Taxpayers' Guide to Education Spending. *Of K-8 districts with 401-750 students. Lowest spending=1; Highest=64

The Lakehurst School District is a community public school district serving students in pre-kindergarten through eighth grade from Lakehurst, in Ocean County, in the U.S. state of New Jersey.

As of the 2023–24 school year, the district, comprised of one school, had an enrollment of 406 students and 40.8 classroom teachers (on an FTE basis), for a student–teacher ratio of 10.0:1.

Public school students from Lakehurst in ninth through twelfth grades attend Manchester Township High School in Manchester Township, as part of a sending/receiving relationship with the Manchester Township School District. As of the 2023–24 school year, the high school had an enrollment of 943 students and 86.0 classroom teachers (on an FTE basis), for a student–teacher ratio of 11.0:1.

== History ==
By July 1973, Central Regional High School had been operating on double sessions at the high school for two years and estimated that it would run out of room to operate on double sessions within two years, leading Lakehurst to exit the district and pursue options with Manchester Township for its 250 high school students. In October 1973, the Lakehurst School District announced that its students would be shifted from Central Regional to the new Manchester Township High School, which opened in September 1976.

The Lakehurst district decided in 2012 against a proposal that would have had borough students attend Jackson Liberty High School as part of a sending / receiving relationship with the Jackson School District. The change in the sending relationship had been considered as a means of reducing the costs associated with paying $14,000 for each of the 150 students attending Manchester High School, as opposed to the $11,300 that would have been paid at Jackson, yielding annual savings of $400,000, less the added cost of transporting students to and from Jackson.

The district had been classified by the New Jersey Department of Education as being in District Factor Group "B", the second lowest of eight groupings. District Factor Groups organize districts statewide to allow comparison by common socioeconomic characteristics of the local districts. From lowest socioeconomic status to highest, the categories are A, B, CD, DE, FG, GH, I and J.

== Attendance boundary ==
The district includes students from the Lakehurst component of Joint Base McGuire–Dix–Lakehurst.

== School ==
Lakehurst Elementary School had an enrollment of 404 students in grades PreK–8 in the 2023–24 school year.

== Administration ==
Core members of the district's administration are:

- Loren Fuhring, superintendent
- Joseph Firetto, business administrator and board secretary

== Board of education ==
The district's board of education, comprised of five members, sets policy and oversees the fiscal and educational operation of the district through its administration. As a Type II school district, the board's trustees are elected directly by voters to serve three-year terms of office on a staggered basis, with one or two seats up for election each year held (since 2012) as part of the November general election. The board appoints a superintendent to oversee the district's day-to-day operations and a business administrator to supervise the business functions of the district.
