= Malast =

Malast is a surname. Notable people with the surname include:

- Kevin Malast (born 1986), American football player
- Mike Malast (born 1983), American sports agent
