= Manchester Township High School =

Public secondary school in Ocean County, New Jersey, United States

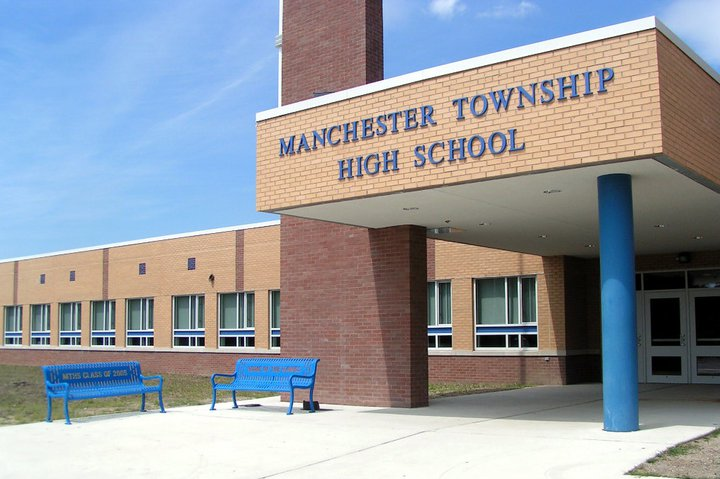

Location
- 101 South Colonial Drive; Manchester Township, Ocean County, New Jersey 08759; United States; 40.00569°N 74.31020°W

Information
- Type: Public high school
- Motto: "Excellence by Example"
- Established: 1974
- School district: Manchester Township School District
- NCES School ID: 340945004660
- Principal: Jamie Brown
- Faculty: 86.8 FTEs
- Grades: 9–12
- Enrollment: 947 (as of 2024–25)
- Student to teacher ratio: 10.9:1
- Colors: Royal blue and gold
- Athletics conference: Shore Conference
- Team name: Hawks
- Newspaper: The Talon News
- Yearbook: Deja Vu
- Website: www.manchestertwp.org/o/mths

Manchester Township High School is a four-year comprehensive public high school that serves students in ninth through twelfth grades in Manchester Township in Ocean County, in the U.S. state of New Jersey, as the lone secondary school of the Manchester Township School District. The school also serves approximately 150 high school students from the borough of Lakehurst, who attend as part of a sending/receiving relationship with the Lakehurst School District.

As of the 2024–25 school year, the school had an enrollment of 947 students and 86.8 classroom teachers (on an FTE basis), for a student–teacher ratio of 10.9:1. There were 390 students (41.2% of enrollment) eligible for free lunch and 85 (9.0% of students) eligible for reduced-cost lunch.

== History ==
Students from Manchester Township had attended Lakewood High School as part of a sending/receiving relationship, though by June 1964 overcrowding led the Lakewood School District to try to end the agreement under which 150 students from Manchester Township attended the Lakewood school.

In October 1973, the Lakehurst district announced that its students would be shifted from Central Regional High School to the new Manchester Township High School.

Completed at a cost of $6.3 million (equivalent to $35.6 million in 2025) on a site covering 100 acres (40 ha), the school opened in September 1976 for nearly 800 students.

== Attendance boundary ==
The school attendance boundary includes dependent students from the Lakehurst component of Joint Base McGuire–Dix–Lakehurst.

== Awards, recognition and rankings ==
The school was the 220th-ranked public high school in New Jersey out of 339 schools statewide in New Jersey Monthly magazine's September 2014 cover story on the state's "Top Public High Schools", using a new ranking methodology. The school had been ranked 245th in the state of 328 schools in 2012, after being ranked 260th in 2010 out of 322 schools listed. The magazine ranked the school 227th in 2008 out of 316 schools. The school was ranked 256th in the magazine's September 2006 issue, which surveyed 316 schools across the state.

== Athletics ==
Manchester Township High School Hawks compete in Division B South of the Shore Conference, an athletic conference comprised of public and private high schools in Monmouth and Ocean counties, along the Jersey Shore. The league operates under the jurisdiction of the New Jersey State Interscholastic Athletic Association (NJSIAA). With 718 students in grades 10-12, the school was classified by the NJSIAA for the 2019–20 school year as Group II for most athletic competition purposes, which included schools with an enrollment of 486 to 758 students in that grade range. The school was classified by the NJSIAA as Group II South for football for 2024–2026, which included schools with 514 to 685 students.

The boys track team won the indoor track state championship in Group II in 1998 and 2003.

The boys track team won the Group II indoor relay state championship in 1998.

The boys' track team won the Group II spring / outdoor track state championship in 1998.

The boys' bowling team won the overall state championship in 2003 and won the Group II state championship in 2010.

The softball team won the Group II state championship in 2003, defeating James Caldwell High School by a score of 1-0 in the tournament final.

The baseball team won the 2003 South Jersey Group II state sectional title.

The girls bowling team has been Group II state champions eight consecutive times, from 2009 to 2016, and won the Group I title in 2020; the team's nine state titles are ranked second in the state. The team has won the Tournament of Champions, the sport's overall state championship, in 2009, 2012 and 2014. Manchester was the first team to win three titles in the Tournament of Champions, which was introduced in 2007.

The girls' basketball team won the Group II state championship in 2019, defeating runner-up Lincoln High School in the tournament final. With the 2020 group finals cancelled as a result of COVID-19, the team was declared as the South II regional champion.

== Administration ==
The school's principal is Jamie Brown. His core administration team includes the three vice principals.

== Notable alumni ==
- Leilani Correa (born 2001, class of 2019), basketball player
- Kevin Malast (born 1986), former football linebacker who played in the NFL for the Chicago Bears, Jacksonville Jaguars and Tennessee Titans.
- Shavar Reynolds Jr. (born 1998), basketball player for London Lions of the Super League Basketball
- Andrew Valmon (born 1965), Olympic gold medal-winning runner in both 1988 and 1992 in the 4 × 400 meters relay.
