= Shavar Reynolds Jr. =

American basketball player (born 1998)

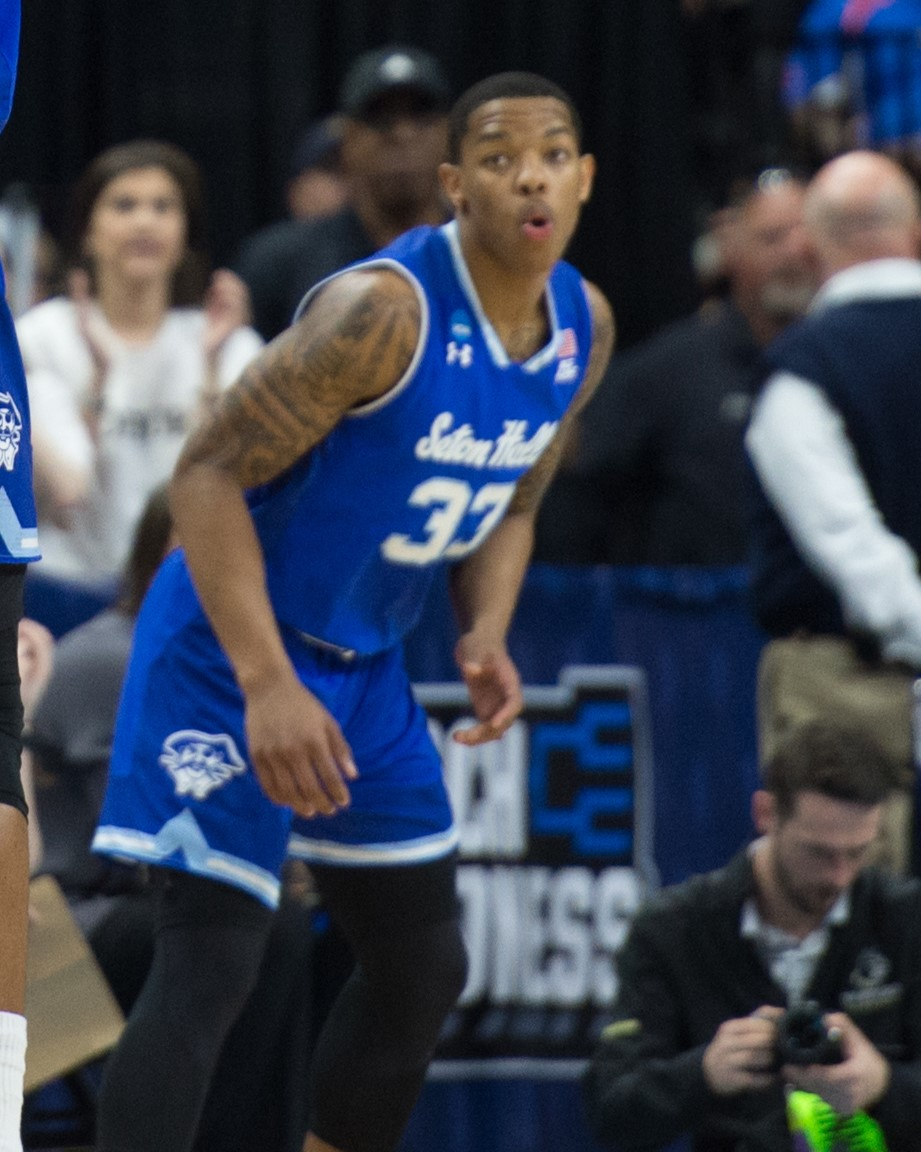
- Reynolds in action with Seton Hall

No. 33 – Tofaş
- Position: Point guard / shooting guard
- League: BSL

Personal information
- Born: May 11, 1998 (age 28) Manchester Township, New Jersey, U.S.
- Listed height: 6 ft 2 in (1.88 m)
- Listed weight: 193 lb (88 kg)

Career information
- High school: Manchester Township (Lakehurst, New Jersey)
- College: Seton Hall (2017–2021); Monmouth (2021–2022)
- NBA draft: 2022: undrafted
- Playing career: 2022–present

Career history
- 2022–2023: Feyenoord
- 2023–2024: Keravnos
- 2024–2025: PAOK Thessaloniki
- 2025–2026: London Lions
- 2026–present: Tofaş

Career highlights
- Cypriot League champion (2024); Cypriot Cup winner (2024); Third-team All-MAAC (2022)

Shavar Reynolds Jr. (born May 11, 1998) is an American professional basketball player for Tofaş of the Basketbol Süper Ligi (BSL). He plays at both the point guard and shooting guard positions.

== Early life ==
Reynolds was born in Manchester Township, New Jersey, to Teekemia and Shavar Reynolds.

== High school ==
Reynolds attended Manchester Township High School at Lakehurst, New Jersey. During his tenure with the school, he averaged 15 points, 8 rebounds, 6 assists and 4 steals per game.

== College career ==
Reynolds attended Covenant College Prep for one year. After one year with the school, he was transferred to Seton Hall, where he became a key player for the squad.

After four years with the Pirates, Reynolds spent his final college year with Monmouth.

== Professional career ==
After going undrafted in the 2022 NBA draft, Reynolds started his professional career with Feyenoord of the BNXT League.

After one year with the club, he joined Keravnos of the Cyprus Basketball Division A. With Keravnos, he won two domestic cups, including the Cypriot League and the Cypriot Cup.

On June 27, 2024, Reynolds signed with Greek club PAOK.

On July 24, 2025, Reynolds joined London Lions of the Super League Basketball.

On June 17, 2026, he signed with Tofaş of the Basketbol Süper Ligi (BSL).
