= Christa McAuliffe Middle School =

Christa McAuliffe Middle School may refer to:

- Christa McAuliffe Middle School - Los Alamitos, California - Los Alamitos Unified School District
- Christa McAuliffe Middle School - Boynton Beach, Florida - School District of Palm Beach County
- Christa McAuliffe Middle School - Jackson, New Jersey - Jackson School District
- Christa McAuliffe Middle School - Houston, Texas - Fort Bend Independent School District
- McAuliffe International School and McAuliffe Manual Middle School - Denver, Colorado - Denver Public Schools
