= Lakehurst Maxfield Field =

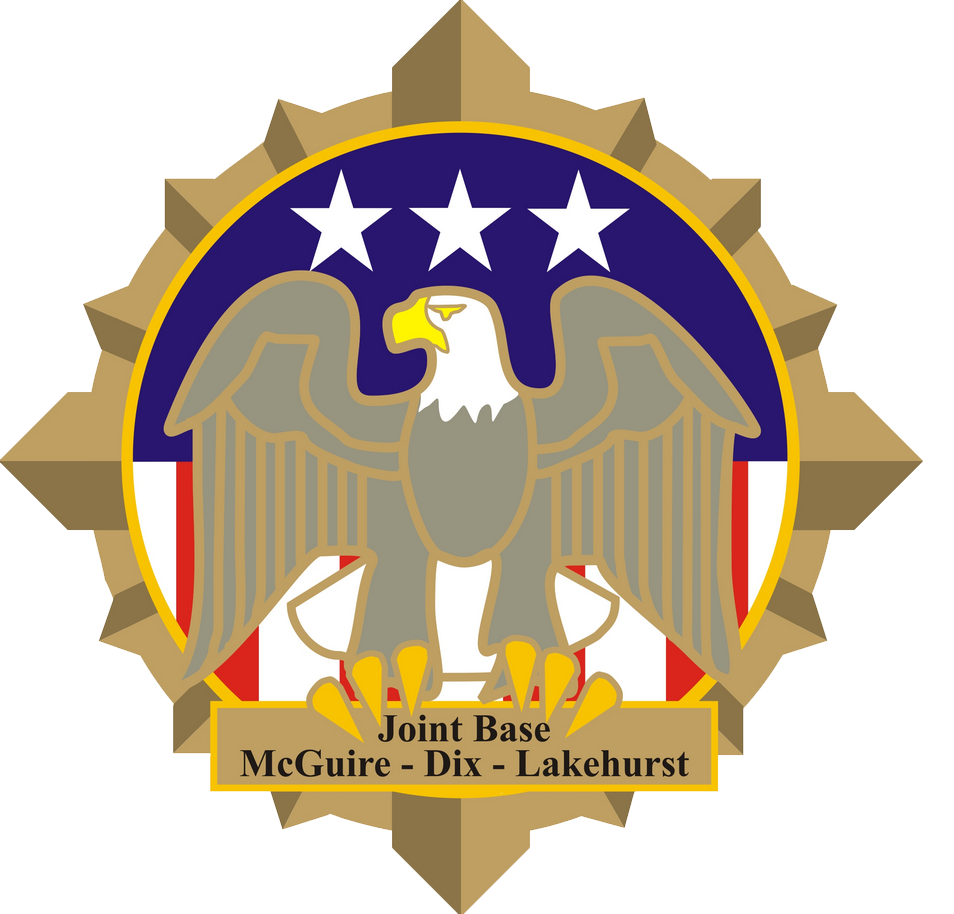
Lakehurst Maxfield Field
- Part of Joint Base McGuire-Dix-Lakehurst
- Lakehurst, Ocean County, New Jersey
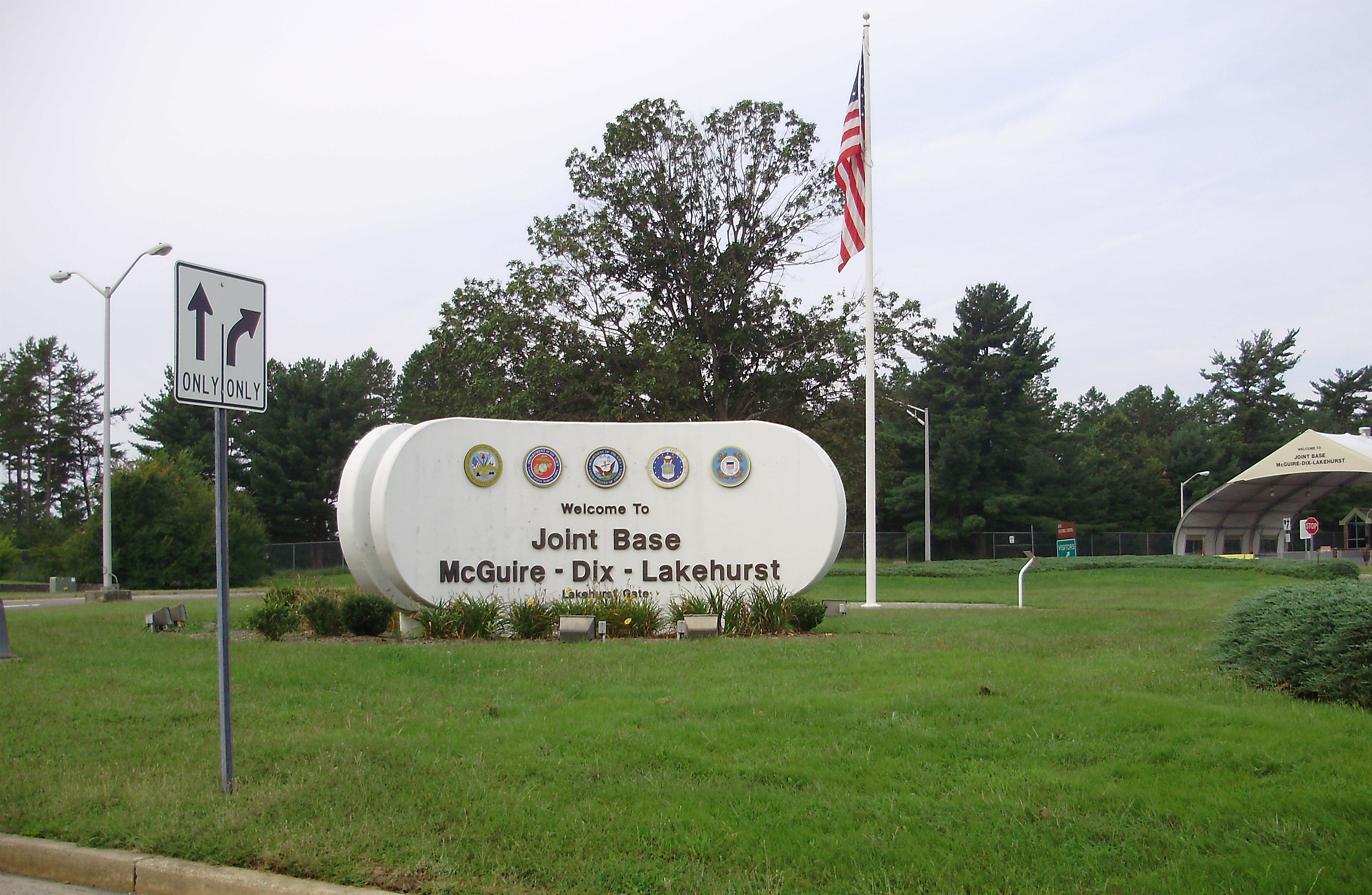
- Front gate at Lakehurst

Site information
- Type: Military airfield
- Owner: United States Air Force
- Operator: 87th Air Base Wing
- Controlled by: United States Air Force

Location
- Coordinates: 40°02′00″N 74°21′13″W

Site history
- Built: 1916
- In use: 1917 – present

Garrison information
- Current commander: CAPT James Howell
- Garrison: 87th Air Base Wing with support from Naval Support Activity Lakehurst
- Occupants: Naval Air Warfare Center Aircraft Division; Center for Naval Aviation Technical Training, Lakehurst; Fleet Logistics Squadron 64; New Jersey Air National Guard; NOSC Fort Dix

Airfield information
- Identifiers: IATA: NEL, ICAO: KNEL, FAA LID: NEL
- Elevation: 100.6 ft (30.7 m) AMSL
Runways
Direction	Length and surface
6/24	5,002 ft (1,525 m) asphalt
15/33	5,002 ft (1,525 m) asphalt
63/243	3,500 ft (1,100 m) concrete

Lakehurst Maxfield Field, formerly known as Naval Air Engineering Station Lakehurst (NAES Lakehurst), is the naval component of Joint Base McGuire–Dix–Lakehurst (JB MDL), a United States Air Force-managed joint base. The airfield is approximately 25 mi (40 km) east-southeast of Trenton in Manchester Township and Jackson Township in Ocean County, New Jersey, United States. It is primarily the home to Naval Air Warfare Center Aircraft Division Lakehurst, although the airfield supports several other flying and non-flying units as well. Its name is an amalgamation of its location and the last name of Commander Louis H. Maxfield, who lost his life when the R-38/USN ZR-2 airship crashed during flight on 24 August 1921 near Hull, England.

When it was consolidated with McGuire Air Force Base and Fort Dix in October 2009, it became the naval component of JB MDL — a United States Air Force–controlled installation — and was placed under the 87th Air Base Wing. However, as with all joint bases, the installation receives support services from the previous installation authorities. Thus, Lakehurst Field is also provided certain services from Naval Support Activity Lakehurst (NSA Lakehurst), whose commander also serves as one of two Base Deputy Commanders. Lakehurst Field was the site of the Hindenburg disaster in 1937.

== Overview ==
=== History ===
Lakehurst Maxfield Field's history began as a test range for ammunition being manufactured for the Imperial Russian Army in 1916. It was then acquired by the United States Army as Camp Kendrick during World War I. The United States Navy purchased the property in 1921 for use as an airship station and renamed it Naval Air Station Lakehurst (NAS Lakehurst).

The United States Navy's lighter-than-air program was conducted at Lakehurst from its inception through the 1930s. NAS Lakehurst was the center of airship development in the United States and housed three of the U.S. Navy's four rigid airships, (ZR-1) Shenandoah, (ZR-3) Los Angeles, and (ZRS-4) Akron. A number of the airship hangars built to berth these ships still survive. Hangar One, in which the Shenandoah was built, held the record for the largest "single room" in the world. According to an article in the January, 1925 issue of National Geographic, the airship hangar "could house three Woolworth Buildings lying side by side." The base also housed many Navy non-rigid airships, otherwise knowns as "blimps," in several squadrons before, during, and after World War II. This included the U.S. Navy's ZPG-3W (EZ-1C), which was deactivated in September 1962. In 2006, after a 44-year hiatus, the U.S. Navy resumed airship operations at Lakehurst with the MZ-3.

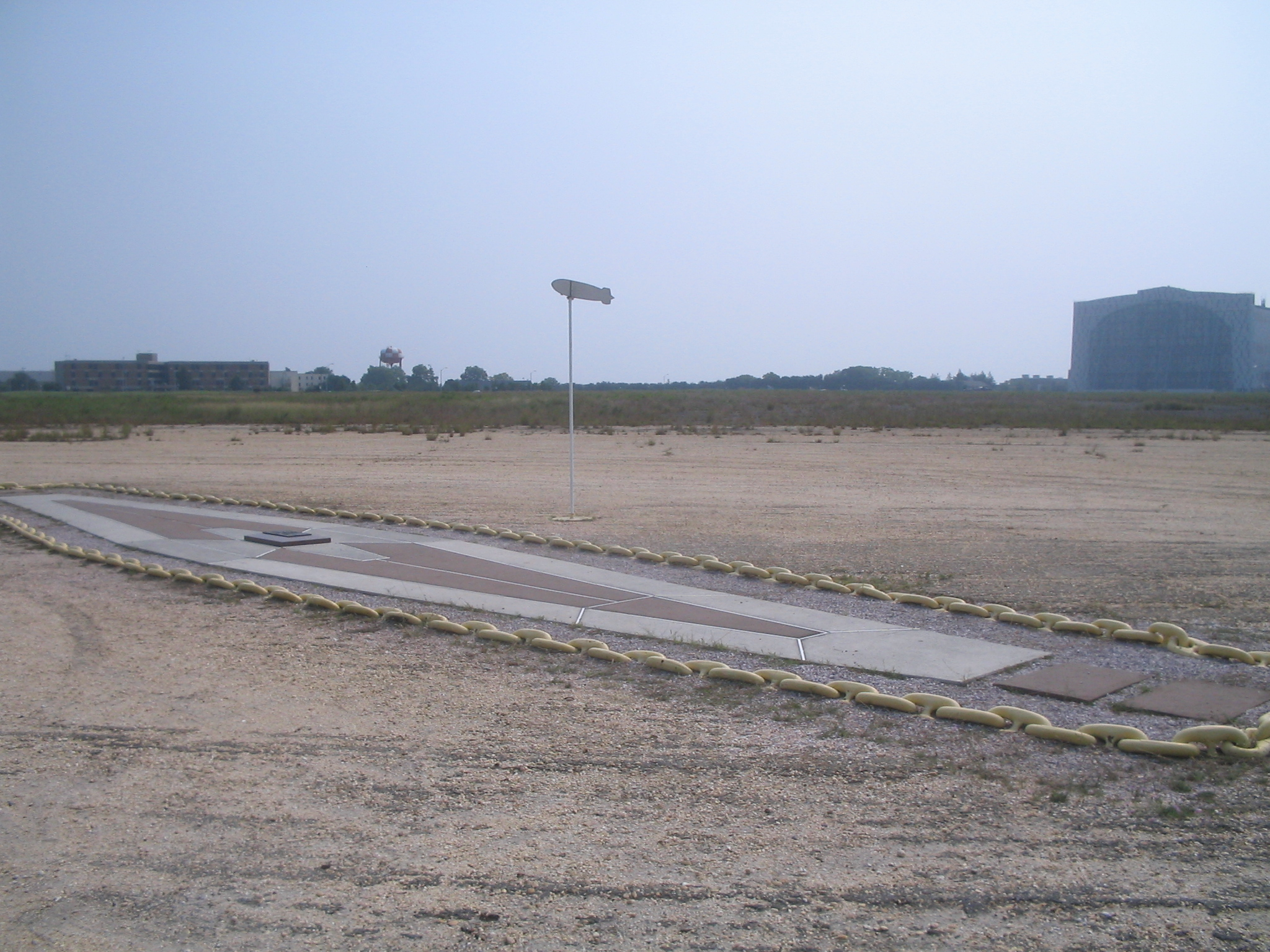
Hindenburg disaster marker

The installation was the site of the LZ 129 Hindenburg disaster on 6 May 1937. Despite the notoriety and well-documented nature of this incident, today there is a simple memorial that denotes the location of the crash at then–NAS Lakehurst in the field behind the large airship hangars on base. A ground marker, painted black, and rimmed by a bright yellow painted chain, marks the spot where the gondola of the Hindenburg hit the ground.

=== Aviation training ===
Lakehurst's mission is to support and develop the Aircraft Launch and Recovery Equipment and Support Equipment for naval aviation. Since the 1950s, aviation boatswain's mates have been trained at Lakehurst to operate catapults and arresting systems on aircraft carriers using rail guided jet donkeys pushing dead loads at 200 knots tested carrier arresting gear cables and tailhooks. The Electromagnetic Aircraft Launch System and the Advanced Arresting Gear system that will replace the existing steam catapults and the Mk-7 arresting gear are being developed and tested at Lakehurst at full-scale shipboard representative test facilities here.

The former NAS Lakehurst also hosted the U.S. Navy's first helicopter squadrons, HU-1 (later HC-1) and HU-2 (later HC-2); The "A" and "C" enlisted training schools for the Aerographer's Mate (AG), Aviation Boatswain Mate (AB, ABE, ABF, ABH), and Parachute Rigger / Aircrew Survival Equipmentman (PR) ratings until their transfer to other Naval Air Technical Training Centers; and an Overhaul & Repair (O&R) facility for fixed-wing aircraft, the forerunner of the former Naval Air Rework Facilities and Naval Aviation Depots (NADEPs) now known as Fleet Readiness Centers (FRCs).

Today the base is used for various Naval Aviation development programs. Lakehurst Maxfield's main airfield has two 5,002 ft (1,525 m) runways under its own control tower, while a separate 13,000 ft (4,000 m) test runway (12/30) – equipped with a separate control tower and pavement-mounted catapults and arresting gear for testing aircraft-carrier suitability of new naval aircraft and new flight-deck systems – is located approximately a mile to the northwest.

== Tenant organizations ==
Lakehurst is home to Naval Air Warfare Center (NAWC) Aircraft Division, Lakehurst, which is the largest command on the field, followed by Fleet Logistics Squadron 64, operating the Navy Reserve Force's C-130T Hercules.

In addition, the field is host to several CNATTU schools, the New Jersey Army National Guard's aviation unit, as well as other tenant organisations from Ocean County, the state of New Jersey, United States Air Force, New Jersey Air National Guard, United States Public Health Service and the United States Department of Justice.

== Naval Support Activity Lakehurst ==
Naval Support Activity Lakehurst
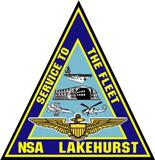
- Command insignia of NSA Lakehurst
- Active: 2009–present
- Country: United States
- Branch: United States Navy
- Type: Support command
- Part of: Joint Base McGuire–Dix–Lakehurst (operationally); Navy Region Mid-Atlantic (administratively)
- Headquartered: Lakehurst Maxfield Field, Joint Base McGuire–Dix–Lakehurst

Commanders
- Current commander: CAPT Frank Ingargiola (Note: Also serves as one of two JB MDL Deputy Commanders)

Naval Support Activity Lakehurst (NSA Lakehurst) is the United States Navy element representing USN and USMC entities for the Department of the Navy–specific asset and resources at Joint Base McGuire–Dix–Lakehurst (JB MDL), and administrative control over Naval personnel who are assigned to units that are assigned to the base.

=== Background ===
When the United States Department of Defense announced that Naval Air Engineering Station Lakehurst (NAES Lakehurst) would be affected by a Base Realignment and Closure (BRAC) action, merging it with two neighboring military bases, McGuire Air Force Base and Fort Dix, it established Joint Base McGuire-Dix-Lakehurst, New Jersey, the nation's only tri-service installation. Each installation's major support services such as MWR, Legal, medical/dental-clinic, and exchange-services roles transitioned over to either Air Force or joint operation. However, both Lakehurst (and also Fort Dix, the third component of the installation) kept several service-specific support services for their personnel. With the disestablishment of NAES Lakehurst as a separate activity from JB MDL, NSA Lakehurst became the official sponsor for these activities.

The person who is the Commanding Officer, NSA Lakehurst is also the primary Deputy Commander of JB MDL, and reports to Commander, Naval Region Mid-Atlantic (CNRMA) for all administrative and logistical concerns, and to the Joint Base Commander for operational concerns.

== Education ==
Dependent children living on-post are zoned to Lakehurst School District and Manchester Township High School (of Manchester Township School District).

== See also ==
- List of United States Navy airfields
- List of United States Navy installations § New Jersey
- Navy Air Stations Blimps bases
