= William Goldstein =

American composer and musical artist (born 1942)

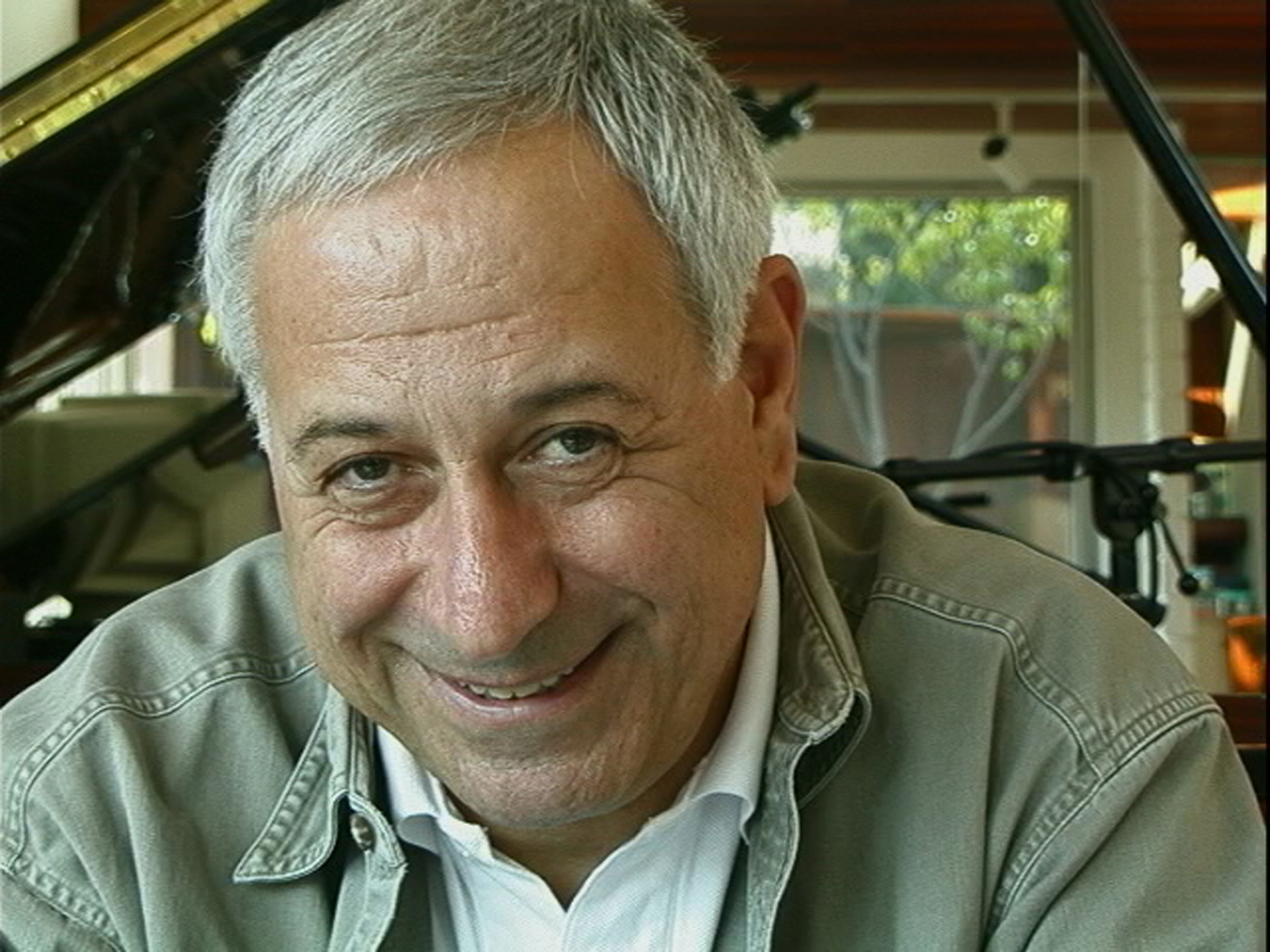
- Born: February 25, 1942 (age 84); Newark, New Jersey, U.S.
- Occupations: Musician; composer; pianist; record producer; opinion journalist
- Years active: 1975–present
- Musical career
- Origin: Newark, New Jersey, U.S.
- Genres: Classical music; Pop music; dance
- Instruments: Piano; keyboards
- Labels: Motown Records; CBS Masterworks
- Website: www.williamgoldstein.com

William Goldstein (born February 25, 1942) is an American composer, recording artist, arts philosopher and improvisational pianist.

Goldstein has received three Emmy nominations and one Grammy nomination for his scores Fame, Hello Again, and Shocker. He has been signed as a recording artist to Motown Records and CBS Masterworks. Goldstein has written arts commentary for public media including The New York Times, Los Angeles Times, and CBS News.

== Biography ==
=== Early life and career ===
Raised in Lakewood Township, New Jersey, Goldstein graduated from Lakewood High School. Goldstein is Jewish.

While in high school, Goldstein learned to play trumpet to join the high school band. Upon graduating, he continued on a joint program with Trenton State College in New Jersey for music education and the Juilliard School once a week to study trumpet. During the draft years of the Vietnam War, he became composer in residence for the United States Army Band.

=== Career ===
Goldstein was signed to Columbia Picture Screen Gems. He was discovered by Berry Gordy, who brought Goldstein to Los Angeles, as a Motown recording artist, composer and producer. Goldstein has composed soundtracks for film and television, notably the television series Fame and The Twilight Zone.

Goldstein also composed the soundtrack for the computer game King's Quest IV. It was the first computer game to have its soundtrack written for the Roland MT-32.

=== Instant Composition ===
Goldstein composes in real time, reviving the art of “instant composition.” He creates ballets with dancers of international renown, improvising complete scores to films that he is seeing for the first time; in 2011, Goldstein was invited by the Transatlantyk International Film and Music Festival in Poznan, Poland, to give master classes on the "Art of Instant Composition." Goldstein records as a solo composer and collaboratively.

=== Educator and masterclasses ===
As an educator and performer of live composition, Goldstein teaches masterclasses and travels internationally.

== Discography ==
Studio albums

- Music From The Original Motion Picture Soundtrack "Bingo Long Traveling All Stars & Motor Kings" (1976)
- Remembrance of Live (1982)
- A Talent For Murder (1984)
- Oceanscape (1986)
- Saving Grace (1986)
- Liberty (Original Television Soundtrack) (1986)
- Hello Again (Original Soundtrack) (1987)
- Switched on Classics (1987)
- Switched On Hollywood (1988)
- Wes Craven's Shocker (The Score) (1989)
- The Quarrel (1992)
- A Tribute To Jacques Cousteau (1993)
- William Goldstein, Basil Poledouris - Danielle Steel's Zoya (CD, Album) (1995)
- Motown...Fame...& Beyond: A Retrospective of Songs By William Goldstein (1995)
- Danielle Steel's Zoya (1995)
- Saving Grace (1997)
- Miracle At Midnight (1998)
- First Impressions: Emotionally Connective Impromptus Of Life (1999)
- The Great White Shark (2003)
- Switched on Classics (2008)
- William Goldstein in Concert (2008)
- Fame (2008)
- Eye for an Eye (2008)
- Forced Vengeance (2008)
- The Miracle Worker (2009)
- Sound Scapes, 4our Movements for Piano and Vibraphone (2009)
- French Connection (2009)
- Force Five (2009)
- Spiritual Electronica (2009)
- Getting Physical (2009)
- Blood River (2009)
- Blood Vows: The Story of a Mafia Wife (2010)
- Isn't It Romantic, Musical portraits from the heart (2010)
- Living Treasures of Japan (2010)
- Mysteries of the Mind (2010)
- Living Sands of Nambi
- The Aliens Are Coming (2012)
- Marilyn: The Untold Story (2012)
- In the Moment (2012)
- A Connecticut Yankeed in the King Arthur's Courty (2013).
- On a Summer Afternoon (2013)
- My First Film Score: The Stoolie (2014)
- Oki in the Middle of the Ocean (2014)
- Up the Creek (2014)
- Jewish Soul (2014)
- Just like Dad (2014)
- Soul of an Actor (2014)
- Twilight Zone (2015)
- In Times of Loss: Music to Heal & Inspire (2015)
- Evocations (2015)
- The Three Kings: A Christmas Story (2015)
- Remembrance Of Love (2016)
- Instant Composition: Continuing the Tradition of Mozart (2016)
- Musing (2016)
- Intensity (2017)
- A Life in Three Notes (2017)
- Oceanscape Volume II (2018)
- A Long Way Home (2019)
- Innocence: Musical Portraits of the Inner Child (2019)
- King's Quest IV (2019)
- The White Lions (2019)
- Muses (2020)
- The Bach Effect: Back & Inspired by Bach (2021)
- A French Suite (2021)
- Jennifer: a Woman's Story (2021)
- Collaborative Composition: Created in the Moment (2021)
- Lots of Luck (2021)
- Hero in the Family (2022)
- Brushstrokes: The Intersection of Art & Music (2022)

Compilation albums

- The Best of William Goldstein Motown (2009)
- William Goldstein Songbook (2013)
- Inspired (2016)
