= Chapelle Russell =

American football player (born 1997)

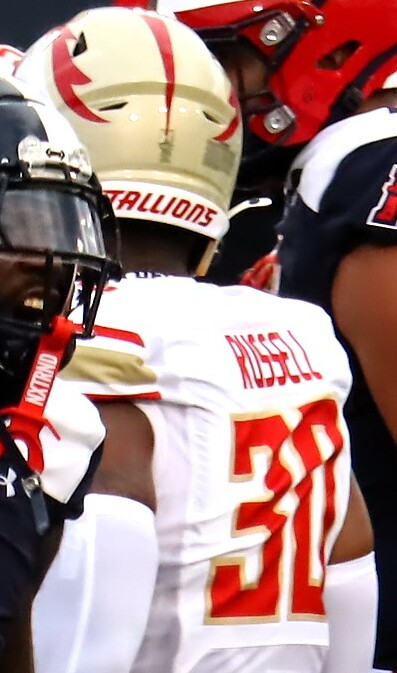
- Russell with the Birmingham Stallions in 2025

No. 53, 30
- Position: Linebacker

Personal information
- Born: January 20, 1997 (age 29); Lakewood Township, New Jersey, U.S.
- Listed height: 6 ft 2 in (1.88 m)
- Listed weight: 236 lb (107 kg)

Career information
- High school: Lakewood
- College: Temple (2015–2019)
- NFL draft: 2020: 7th round, 241st overall pick

Career history
- Tampa Bay Buccaneers (2020); Jacksonville Jaguars (2021); Pittsburgh Steelers (2022–2023)*; Washington Commanders (2024)*; Birmingham Stallions (2025)
- * Offseason or practice squad member only

Career NFL statistics as of 2023
- Total tackles: 18
- Stats at Pro Football Reference

Chapelle Russell (born January 20, 1997) is an American former professional football player who was a linebacker in the National Football League (NFL). He played college football for the Temple Owls.

== College career ==
Russell verbally committed to Temple University during his senior year at Lakewood High School. He endured ACL surgery during his redshirt freshman year at Temple but was named Temple's Male Comeback Player of the Year in 2018. In 2019, Russell recorded 72 tackles (47 solo) with nine tackles for loss and three pass breakups. In his Temple career, he played 45 games over a four-year career and recorded 237 tackles, 19.5 tackles for loss, three sacks, nine pass breakups, three forced fumbles, and six fumble recoveries. At the 2020 NFL Scouting Combine in Indianapolis, Russell ran the 40-yard dash in 4.69 seconds, did 21 reps of 225 pounds in the bench press, and recorded a 35-inch vertical leap.

== Professional career ==
Pre-draft measurables
Height	Weight	Arm length	Hand span	40-yard dash	10-yard split	20-yard split	20-yard shuttle	Three-cone drill	Vertical jump	Broad jump	Bench press
6 ft 2 in (1.88 m)	236 lb (107 kg)	32 3/8 in (0.82 m)	10 in (0.25 m)	4.69 s	1.56 s	2.74 s	4.41 s	7.38 s	35.0 in (0.89 m)	10 ft 1 in (3.07 m)	21 reps
All values from NFL Combine

=== Tampa Bay Buccaneers ===
Russell was selected by the Tampa Bay Buccaneers in the seventh round with the 241st overall pick in the 2020 NFL draft. He was waived by the Buccaneers during final roster cuts on September 5, 2020, and was signed to the practice squad the following day. He was promoted to the active roster on October 13, 2020. He was waived on January 8, 2021.

=== Jacksonville Jaguars ===
On January 11, 2021, Russell was claimed off waivers by the Jacksonville Jaguars. He was waived on August 29, 2022.

=== Pittsburgh Steelers ===
On September 1, 2022, Russell was signed to the Pittsburgh Steelers practice squad. He signed a reserve/future contract on January 12, 2023. He was waived/injured on August 13, 2023, and placed on injured reserve.

=== Washington Commanders ===
Russell was signed by the Washington Commanders on August 20, 2024. He was released on August 27, 2024.

=== Birmingham Stallions ===
On December 5, 2024, Russell signed with the Birmingham Stallions of the United Football League (UFL).

== Personal life ==
During his youth, Russell was part of a family in the US Navy that frequently moved. He was known as Chapelle Cook until changing his last name to Russell to honor his deceased father.
