= Jackson Township High School =

School district in Ocean County, New Jersey, US

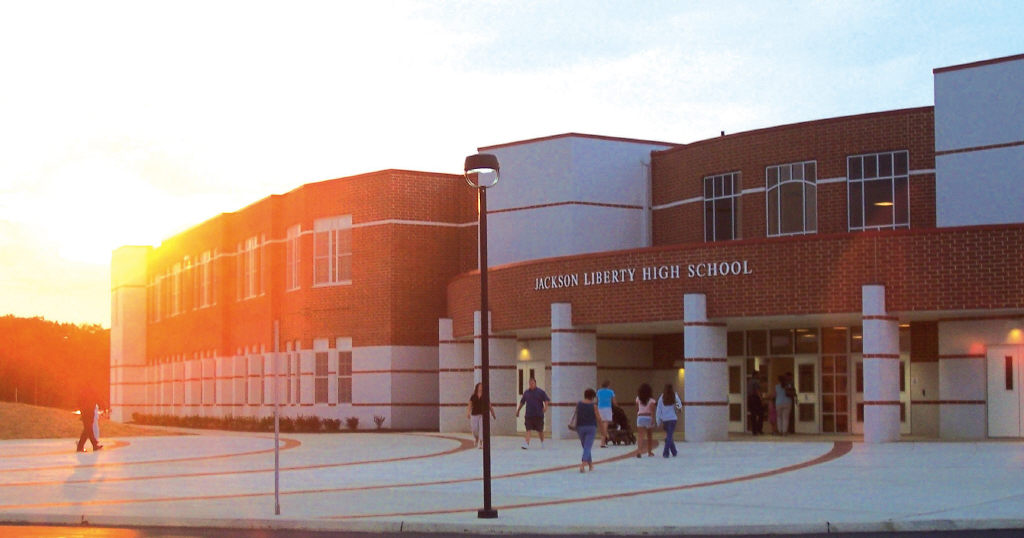

Location
- 125 North Hope Chapel Road; Jackson Township, Ocean County, New Jersey 08527; United States
- 40.09155°N 74.26178°W

Information
- Type: Public high school
- Established: 2006
- School district: Jackson School District
- NCES School ID: 340774000787
- Principal: Geoffrey Brignola
- Faculty: 74.3 FTEs
- Grades: 9-12
- Enrollment: 1,012 (as of 2024–25)
- Student to teacher ratio: 13.6:1
- Colors: Red and silver and Navy Blue
- Athletics conference: Shore Conference
- Team name: Lions
- Rivals: Donovan Catholic High School; Jackson Memorial High School; Lakewood High School
- Website: jths.jacksonsd.org

Jackson Township High School is a four-year comprehensive public high school serving students in ninth through twelfth grades from Jackson Township, in Ocean County, New Jersey, United States, operating as part of the Jackson School District. It is the district's newest secondary school building and was the former site of Jackson Liberty High School, which was the sister high school of Jackson Memorial High School and merged for the 2024–25 school year.

As of the 2024–25 school year, the school had an enrollment of 1,012 students and 74.3 classroom teachers (on an FTE basis), for a student–teacher ratio of 13.6:1. There were 444 students (43.9% of enrollment) eligible for free lunch and 93 (9.2% of students) eligible for reduced-cost lunch.

== History ==
Built starting in 2005, the school opened in September 2006 with 800 students in 9th and 10th grades. The school was constructed at a cost of $70 million (equivalent to $111.8 million in 2025).

As part of an effort to deal with a mounting budget deficit, the district announced in February 2025 that for the 2025–26 school year, all high school students would be attending Jackson Liberty High School, with Jackson Memorial High School repurposed for use as a middle school.

== Design ==
The school has a maximum capacity of 1,900 students in grades 9–12. The school stands at two stories and 288,500 square feet (26,800 m^{2}) on a 150-acre (0.61 km^{2}) parcel of land, and features 85 classrooms, a 1,800-seat gymnasium, and about a dozen athletic fields.

The school has two floors.

The bottom floor holds a liberal arts (history, English, language) wing (commonly referred to as the "C" wing) as well as a mathematics and science wing (commonly referred to as the "B" wing).

The upstairs wings hold additional mathematics, language, and science classes. The "D" wing is home to the arts (fine art, television production, CAD, graphic design) classes. Additionally the "E" wing is home to business and finance classes. The names of previous classes are found on murals throughout the main hallway and into the business ("E") wing.

A central atrium ("A" wing) connects the "E", "D", "C", and "B" wings into a central main hallway, with the convergence of the wings (expect the "D" wing) in front of the library (IMC). Also there is a cafeteria in both wings.

The theater (auditorium) holds about 900 people and is equipped to handle presentations as well as performances. The two gymnasiums are next to each other along with a weight room and an athletic trainer's office. The football field is surrounded by a regulation size track used for meets. There is also a music wing behind the auditorium and a lecture hall in the atrium.

Jackson Liberty High School is Wi-Fi ready and wireless LAN stations are set up throughout the school. Teachers are given swivel-head laptops which have a wireless card which connect them to projectors in each classroom, with full multimedia functionality. The student-run television channel, Jackson Liberty Live, as well as a DVD and VCR hook up to the projector for large format display. The school auditorium has a capacity of 799 and is equipped with advanced lighting and sound systems.

== Awards, recognition and rankings ==
The school was the 128th-ranked public high school in New Jersey out of 339 schools statewide in New Jersey Monthly magazine's September 2014 cover story on the state's "Top Public High Schools", using a new ranking methodology. The school had been ranked 218th in the state of 328 schools in 2012, after being ranked 215th in 2010 out of 322 schools listed.

Schooldigger.com ranked the school as tied for 129th out of 376 public high schools statewide in its 2010 rankings (an increase of 67 positions from the 2009 rank) which were based on the combined percentage of students classified as proficient or above proficient on the language arts literacy and mathematics components of the High School Proficiency Assessment (HSPA).

== Athletics ==
The Jackson Liberty High School compete in Division B South of the Shore Conference, an athletic conference comprised of public and private high schools in Monmouth and Ocean counties along the Jersey Shore. The league operates under the jurisdiction of the New Jersey State Interscholastic Athletic Association (NJSIAA). With 833 students in grades 10-12, the school was classified by the NJSIAA for the 2019–20 school year as Group III for most athletic competition purposes, which included schools with an enrollment of 761 to 1,058 students in that grade range. The school was classified by the NJSIAA as Group III South for football for 2024–2026, which included schools with 695 to 882 students.

The school participates as the host school / lead agency in a joint ice hockey team with Jackson Memorial High School and Point Pleasant Borough High School. The co-op program operates under agreements scheduled to expire at the end of the 2023–24 school year.

Jackson Liberty has its student section, the Red Zone, in which students wearing a red zone shirt receive free admission to home football and basketball games. Liberty has a section at the football games for the red zone in the bleachers behind the left end zone. The red zone plays a part in pep rallies, and all around school spirit.

In football the rivals of Jackson Liberty High School had been Jackson Memorial High School, Lakewood High School and Monsignor Donovan High School. Tim Osborn was the first football coach at Jackson Liberty High School, taking over the team when the program started. After 2–8 seasons and 4–6 seasons, Coach Osborn led the Lions to their first winning season in school history in 2012 at 6-4, and to their first playoff appearance, in a loss to Colonia High School. This season however, was Coach Osborn's final season leading the Liberty Lions. On April 13, 2013, Tim Osborn died of a heart attack while at the gym at age 53. In May 2013, Jim Sharples was named as the head coach of the Lions. He was the defensive coordinator under Coach Osborn.

The boys' bowling team won the Group II state championship in 2019 and 2020. The team won the 2019 Tournament of Champions, defeating Group IV champion and ToC runner-up South Brunswick High School in the final match.

The girls wrestling team won the inaugural NJSIAA Team Championship in 2026 following a perfect 19-0 season, defeating Gloucester City High School in the South Jersey final before defeating Morris Hills High School in the state championship at Jersey Mike's Arena.

== Fine arts ==
=== Music ===
Jackson Liberty has had a successful Marching Band and Jazz Band since the program's inception in 2007. In 2010, the Jackson Liberty Jazz Band competed throughout the State and earned numerous Best Rhythm Section, Trumpet Section, Trombone Section, and Saxophone Section awards. They have also earned 10 best soloist awards. On April 24, 2010, the Jackson Liberty Jazz Band competed in the NJAJE Division II State Finals in Princeton, New Jersey. Liberty placed 3rd and also won two best soloist awards which were awarded to Tenor Sax player Gary Basko, and Bass Guitarist Zane Decker. In 2013 in three straight competitions the marching band beat Jackson Memorial in overall music for the first time ever. During the 2017 band season, the JLHS Marching band won for the first time Tournament of Bands State Championship, Metropolitan Championship and Atlantic Coast Championship in the 4A division under the direction of Scott Katona.

=== AtLib Players ===
The students in the Drama Club at Jackson Liberty High School are called the AtLib Players. The Drama Club is directed by Mrs. Mathias, and Miss Hanlon (Now Mrs. Szoke). Past productions put on by the AtLib players include Guys and Dolls, A Christmas Carol, All Shook Up, The Crucible, The Father of the Bride, Little Shop of Horrors, The Miracle Worker, Anything Goes, Big: The Musical, It's a Wonderful Life, Miracle on 34th Street and Oklahoma!.

=== JTV ===
The Jackson TV program includes the TV Tech Class, which makes music videos, short films, etc. They compete annually at the STN (Student Television Network) Competition. Competing locations that include Texas, Florida, California and more recently Atlanta, Georgia. JTV is three-time National Champions in the Music Video category of STN. The students that are a part of JTV also help film sporting events, and other school functions, such as plays and concerts.

== Administration ==
The principal of Jackson Township High School is Geoffrey Brignola, who had been the principal of Jackson Liberty High School since the 2018-19 academic school year. His administration team includes three assistant principals. Brignola became the principal of Jackson Liberty High School after the school's first principal, Maureen Butler retired; Brignola had been an assistant principal in the school since the 2007-08 academic school year.

== Notable alumni ==
- Cassidy Benintente (born 1994), soccer player who played as a defender and midfielder for Sky Blue FC of the National Women's Soccer League
- Bob Davies, head football coach at Hamline University in Saint Paul, Minnesota, since December 2025
- Tyler Smarslok (born 1992), professional baseball coach for the Washington Nationals
