= Tyler Smarslok =

American baseball player and manager (born 1992)

Washington Nationals – No. 1
- Coach
- Born: February 7, 1992 (age 34); Jackson Township, New Jersey, U.S.
- Bats: Right Throws: Right

Teams
- As coach: Miami Marlins (2025); Washington Nationals (2026–present)

Tyler Brian Smarslok (born February 7, 1992) is an American professional baseball coach for the Washington Nationals of Major League Baseball (MLB). He has also coached in MLB for the Miami Marlins.

== Biography ==
Smarslok grew up in Jackson Township, New Jersey, and played prep baseball at Jackson Liberty High School. He attended Kean University and played all four years for the Cougars, before graduating in 2015 with a degree in exercise science. He joined the Cougars' coaching staff for the following season and held coaching jobs at several colleges around the country over the next few years.

Smarslok joined the Minnesota Twins organization in 2021 as a defensive coach for the Class-AAA St. Paul Saints. After three years in that role, at times filling in for manager Toby Gardenhire, Smarslok was named bench coach for the 2024 season. He managed the Salt River Rafters in the Arizona Fall League after the 2024 season, guiding them to a league championship title.

Ahead of the 2025 season, Smarslok landed his first job on a major league coaching staff, as first-year manager Clayton McCullough hired him to be the first base coach of the Miami Marlins. After one season in Miami, Smarslok moved across the division to the rival Washington Nationals, joining the coaching staff as a field coordinator under rookie manager Blake Butera.
