= Bob Davies (American football) =

American football coach

Current position
- Title: Head coach
- Team: Hamline
- Conference: MIAC
- Record: 1–6

Biographical details
- Born: c. 1995 (age 30–31); Jackson Township, New Jersey, U.S.
- Education: Monmouth University (B.A. 2017)

Playing career
- 2016: Monmouth
- Position: Quarterback

Coaching career (HC unless noted)

Football
- 2015: Monmouth (student assistant)
- 2017: Princeton (assistant)
- 2018: St. Lawrence (QB)
- 2019: Franklin Pierce (OC)
- 2020–2023: Carleton (OC/QB/TE)
- 2024: Marist (OC/QB)
- 2025: Gustavus Adolphus (OC/QB)
- 2026–present: Hamline

Head coaching record
- Overall: 1–6 (college football)

Bob Davies (born c. 1995) is an American college football coach. He is the head football coach for Hamline University in Saint Paul, Minnesota, a position he has held since 2026.

Davies began his collegiate coaching career shortly after his time as a player at Monmouth University, where he spent a season as a student assistant.

== Early life and education ==
Raised in Jackson Township, New Jersey, Davies played quarterback for Jackson Liberty High School (since renamed as Jackson Township High School) and was team captain in his senior year.

== Coaching career ==
=== Early coaching career ===
Davies began his coaching career in 2015 as a student assistant coach for the Monmouth Hawks, where he had also played quarterback for the 2016 season.

In 2017, Davies joined the coaching staff at Princeton University as an assistant. The following year, he served as quarterbacks coach at St. Lawrence University for the 2018 season. He was the offensive coordinator at Franklin Pierce University for the 2019 season.

=== Carleton College ===
Davies joined the coaching staff at Carleton College in 2020, where he served as offensive coordinator, quarterbacks and tight ends coach, and video coordinator from 2020 to 2023. During his tenure, Carleton experienced the winningest three-year stretch in program history, with offenses that broke 23 school records and guided the program to its first winning season in 13 years. Davies also coached the school's all-time leading passer.

=== Marist College ===
In 2024, Davies was offensive coordinator and quarterbacks coach at Marist College, a Division I FCS program in the Pioneer Football League. During his season with Marist, he was one of the youngest offensive coordinators in Division I football.

=== Gustavus Adolphus College ===
In February 2025, Davies was hired as offensive coordinator and quarterbacks coach at Gustavus Adolphus College. His offense increased scoring by more than a touchdown per game and produced an All-Conference quarterback despite that player starting only the final seven games of the season.

=== Hamline University ===
In December 2025, Davies was named the head football coach at Hamline University.

== Head coaching record ==
Year	Team	Overall	Conference	Standing	Bowl/playoffs
Hamline Pipers (Minnesota Intercollegiate Athletic Conference) (2026–present)
2026	Hamline	1–6	0–6		
Hamline:		1–6	0–6		
Total:		1–6			
