= Jackson Memorial High School =

Public secondary school in Ocean County, New Jersey, United States

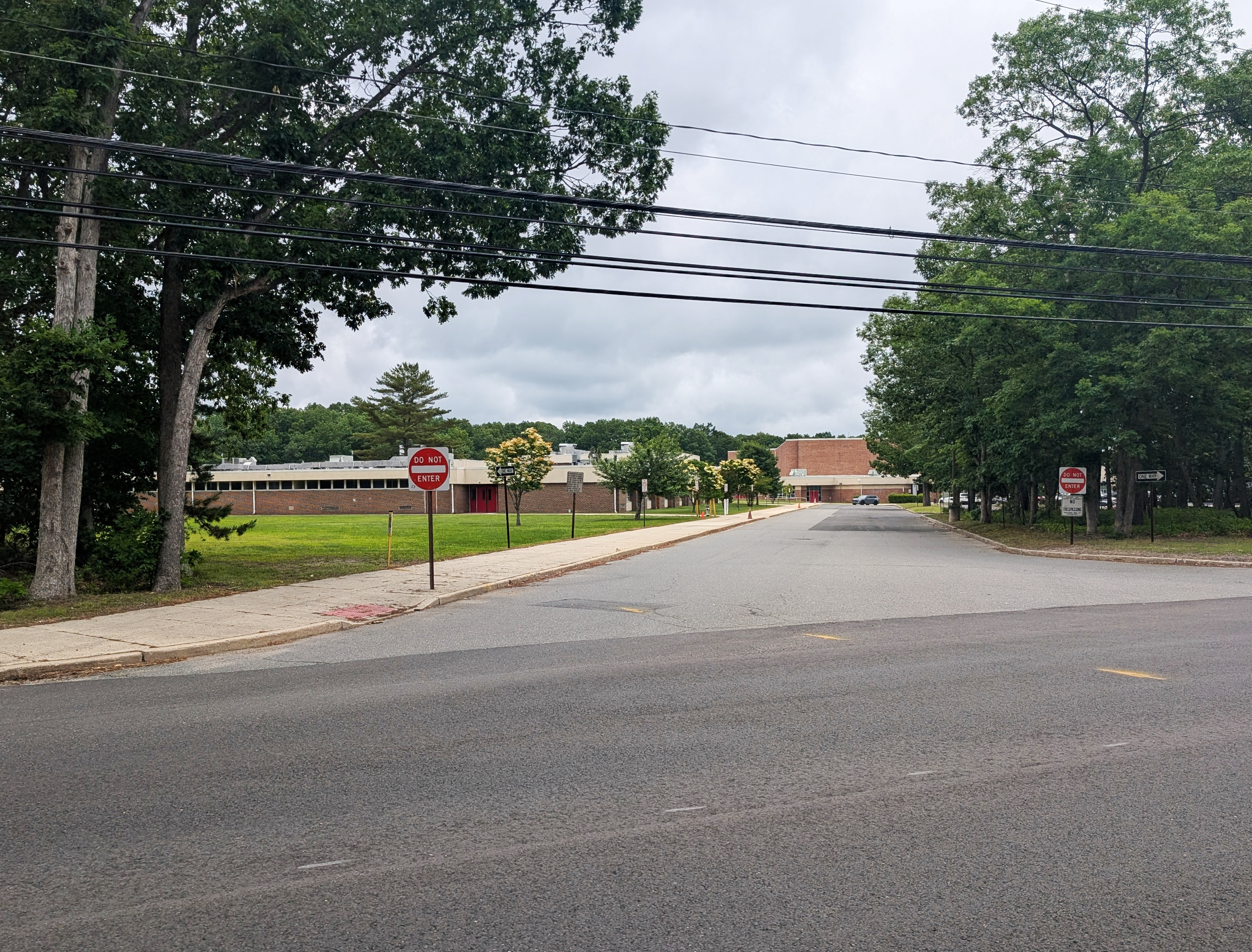

Location
- 101 Don Connor Boulevard; Jackson Township, Ocean County, New Jersey 08527; United States; 40.106412°N 74.346623°W

Information
- Type: Public high school
- Established: September 1963
- Closed: June 2025
- School district: Jackson School District
- NCES School ID: 340774004612
- Principal: Kevin DiEugenio
- Faculty: 115.9 FTEs
- Grades: 9-12
- Enrollment: 1,577 (as of 2024–25)
- Student to teacher ratio: 13.6:1
- Colors: Red; Black
- Athletics conference: Shore Conference
- Team name: Jaguars
- Website: www.jacksonsd.org/Domain/17

Jackson Memorial High School was a four-year comprehensive public high school serving students in ninth through twelfth grades in Jackson Township, in Ocean County, in the U.S. state of New Jersey, opened in 1963 as part of the Jackson School District. It was the sister high school of Jackson Liberty High School, which opened in late summer 2006.

As of the 2024–25 school year, the school had an enrollment of 1,577 students and 115.9 classroom teachers (on an FTE basis), for a student–teacher ratio of 13.6:1. There were 445 students (28.2% of enrollment) eligible for free lunch and 79 (5.0% of students) eligible for reduced-cost lunch.

== History ==
Before the high school opened, students living in Jackson Township attended Lakewood High School as part of a sending/receiving relationship.

Jackson High School first opened in September 1963 with 700 students in grades 7-9, though other district school facilities were used on a temporary basis as the building that housed Jackson Junior-Senior High School wasn't completed and opened to students until the spring of 1964. The school was originally a single, one story building with three wings. Around 1970, a second story was added to one wing. In the 1980s, it was expanded to include the nearby middle school which became known as the Clayton building. The original high school building was known as the memorial building in the early 1990s; later it was renamed the Bernie Reider Hall, for a longtime wrestling coach and former principal. The Fine Arts building, added c. 1993, connects the once separate Clayton building, previously a middle school, and the two-story Bernie Reider Hall.

As part of an effort to deal with a mounting budget deficit, the district announced in February 2025 that for the 2025–26 school year, all high school students would be attending Jackson Liberty High School, with Jackson Memorial High School repurposed for use as a middle school for 7th to 8th grade students.

== Awards, recognition and rankings ==
The school was the 115th-ranked public high school in New Jersey out of 339 schools statewide in New Jersey Monthly magazine's September 2014 cover story on the state's "Top Public High Schools", using a new ranking methodology. The school had been ranked 188th in the state of 328 schools in 2012, after being ranked 181st in 2010 out of 322 schools listed. The magazine ranked the school 216th in the magazine's September 2008 issue, which surveyed 316 schools across the state. Schooldigger.com ranked the school 166th out of 381 public high schools statewide in its 2011 rankings (a decrease of 22 positions from the 2010 ranking) which were based on the combined percentage of students classified as proficient or above proficient on the mathematics (80.8%) and language arts literacy (94.1%) components of the High School Proficiency Assessment (HSPA).

== Athletics ==
The Jackson Memorial High School Jaguars competed in Division A South of the Shore Conference, an athletic conference comprised of public and private high schools in Monmouth and Ocean counties along the Jersey Shore. The league operates under the jurisdiction of the New Jersey State Interscholastic Athletic Association (NJSIAA). With 1,186 students in grades 10-12, the school was classified by the NJSIAA for the 2019–20 school year as Group IV for most athletic competition purposes, which included schools with an enrollment of 1,060 to 5,049 students in that grade range. The school was classified by the NJSIAA as Group IV South for football for 2024–2026, which included schools with 890 to 1,298 students.

The school participated in a joint ice hockey team with Point Pleasant Borough High School in which Jackson Liberty High School is the host school / lead agency. The co-op program operates under agreements scheduled to expire at the end of the 2023–24 school year.

Jackson Memorial's key rivals were Southern Regional, Toms River South, Toms River North, Toms River East, Brick Memorial and Brick Township.

Baseball

- Team championships
  - Ocean County Tournament champions - 1972, 2012, 2015
  - Shore Conference Tournament champions - 1984, 2012
  - South Jersey Group IV sectional champions - 2002, 2010, 2014, 2018, 2024
  - State champions - 1972 (in Group III, with a 2-1 win against runner-up Summit High School led by future MLB player Willie Wilson) and 2014 (in Group IV, with a 2-0 win vs. Roxbury High School)

Girls basketball

- Team championships
  - Group IV state champions - 2012 (with a 50-47 win vs. North Hunterdon High School in the finals)

Boys bowling

- Team championships
  - 1975-1976 Overall state champions
  - 2010-2011 South Jersey Group IV sectional champions
  - 2010-2011 Group IV state champions
  - 2011-2012 South Jersey Group IV sectional champions
  - 2011-2012 Group IV state champions
  - 2012-2013 South Jersey Group IV sectional champions
  - 2012-2013 Group IV state champions
- Individual champions
  - Mike Ormsby - 2013 individual state champion
  - Donald Kane - 2013 South Jersey individual state sectional champion
  - Mike Ormsby - 2011 South Jersey individual state sectional champion
  - 2022 Group III state champion

Girls bowling

- Team championships
  - 1975 Overall state champion
  - 1978 Overall state champion
  - 2015 Group IV state champion

Boys cross country

- Team championships
  - State sectional champions - 2006
  - Meet of Champions winners - 2006
  - 2006-2007 New Jersey state champions
  - Central Jersey Group IV Champions - 2006, 2007

Girls cross country

- Team championships
  - Central Jersey Group IV Champions - 2004, 2005

Football

- Team championships
  - South Jersey Group IV sectional champions - 2000 (finishing 12-0 after a 14-7 overtime win against Shawnee High School in overtime) and 2001 (with a 12-0 record after a 24-0 win vs. Cherokee High School in the finals)
  - Central Jersey Group IV sectional champions - 2005 (finishing 12-0 after a 30-28 win vs. Brick Memorial High School on a last-second touchdown), 2014 and 2015.

Boys' ice hockey

- Team championships
  - Handchen Cup - 2017

Indoor relay

- Team championships
  - Girls champion Group IV - 2003, 2005; Group III - 2016

Boys' soccer

- Team championships
  - South Jersey Group IV sectional champions - 1986 & 1990
  - New Jersey Group IV state champions - 1990 (defeating Kearny High School by a score of 4-0, to finish the season 22-1)

Boys' spring track

- Team championships
  - 2009-2010 Ocean County champions

Girls' spring track

- Team championships
  - 2006 Group IV state champion

Boys' winter track

- Team championships
  - 2010 Group III state champions
  - 2010 Central Jersey Group III sectional champions

Girls' winter track

- Team championships
  - Group IV state championship - 2005, 2006

Wrestling

- Team championships
  - Central Jersey Group IV state sectional champions - 2004-2007, 2010, 2011, 2015-2017, 2019.
  - Group IV state champion - 2007, 2010, 2011

== Marching band ==
The Jackson Memorial Jaguar Band has performed at many events including:

2013 New Year's Day (Tournament of Roses Parade) in Pasadena Presidential Inaugural Parade for George W. Bush, Cherry Blossom Parade: Washington DC, Philadelphia Thanksgiving Day Parade, NYC St. Patrick's Day Parade, D-Day Invasion Ceremony: Normandy-France, Hula Bowl Halftime and pregame: Waikiki-Hawaii, 4 Ticker Tape parades for the New York Yankees, 2 Ticker Tape parades for the New York Giants (NFL), Opening Night performance for "42nd Street": Ford Theater-NYC, Opening Night performance for "The Music Man" NYC, Performance at the Funeral of Levon Helm: Woodstock-NY, Conan O'Brien: 10th Anniversary Special, Radio City Music Hall: Performance for Dolly Parton

The Jackson Jaguar Marching Band won the USBands Group 6A National Championship Title in 2013 with a score of 96.3, their first national championship. They won first place in the percussion and music category then second in colorguard, general effect, and marching. In 2017, the band won the state title and won the national 6A championship, with a score of 92.375.

== Administration ==
Kevin DiEugenio is the principal of Jackson Memorial High School. His core administration team includes three assistant principals.

== Notable alumni ==
- Scotty Cranmer (born 1987), professional BMX rider who has won nine X Games medals
- Joey DeZart (born 1998), professional soccer player who currently plays as a midfielder for Orlando City in Major League Soccer
- Erin Gleason (born 1977), short track speed skater who competed in three events at the 1998 Winter Olympics
- E. J. Nduka (born 1988), professional wrestler who competed for WWE
- Anthony Stolarz (born 1994, class of 2012), professional ice hockey goaltender for the Edmonton Oilers
- Tom Tarver, quarterback who played for the Rutgers University Scarlet Knights, after leading Jackson Memorial to a 32-7 record during his high school career
- Matt Thaiss (born 1995, class of 2013), first round pick in the 2016 MLB Draft by the Los Angeles Angels
- Zakk Wylde (born 1967), guitarist for Ozzy Osbourne and Black Label Society

== Sources ==
- Erbe, E. Robert (1999). Cranberries, Coops, and Courts: A History of Jackson Township.
