= Purnell Mincy =

American baseball player

- Pitcher
- Born: February 14, 1916; Statesboro, Georgia, U.S.
- Died: April 20, 2003 (aged 87); New York, New York, U.S.
- Batted: Left Threw: Left

Negro league baseball debut
- 1938, for the Pittsburgh Crawfords

Last appearance
- 1940, for the Newark Eagles

Teams
- Pittsburgh Crawfords (1938); Philadelphia Stars (1939); New York Black Yankees (1940); Newark Eagles (1940)

Purnell Cecil Mincy (February 14, 1916 – April 20, 2003) was an American Negro league pitcher from 1938 to 1940.

A native of Statesboro, Georgia, Mincy attended Lakewood High School in Lakewood Township, New Jersey, where he was an all-state selection in football, basketball and baseball. He made his Negro leagues debut in 1938 with the Pittsburgh Crawfords, and went on to play for the Philadelphia Stars, New York Black Yankees, and Newark Eagles. Mincy's baseball career ended due to an elbow injury in 1941. He died in New York, New York in 2003 at age 87.
