= Manchester Township School District =

School district in Ocean County, New Jersey, US

Address
- 121 Route 539 Whiting, Ocean County, New Jersey, 08759; United States
- Coordinates: 39.957296°N 74.390669°W

District information
- Grades: PreK-12
- Superintendent: Diane Pedroza
- Business administrator: Craig A. Lorentzen
- Schools: 6

Students and staff
- Enrollment: 2,916 (as of 2024–25)
- Faculty: 293.9 FTEs
- Student–teacher ratio: 9.9:1

Other information
- District Factor Group: B
- Website: www.manchestertwp.org
Ind.	Per pupil	District spending	Rank (*)	K-12 average	%± vs. average
1A	Total Spending	$18,727	47	$18,891	−0.9%
1	Budgetary Cost	14,152	41	14,783	−4.3%
2	Classroom Instruction	8,571	49	8,763	−2.2%
6	Support Services	1,987	28	2,392	−16.9%
8	Administrative Cost	1,320	14	1,485	−11.1%
10	Operations & Maintenance	1,702	41	1,783	−4.5%
13	Extracurricular Activities	362	27	268	35.1%
16	Median Teacher Salary	59,679	19	64,043
Data from NJDoE 2014 Taxpayers' Guide to Education Spending. *Of K-12 districts with 1,800-3,500 students. Lowest spending=1; Highest=68

The Manchester Township School District is a comprehensive community school district serving students in pre-kindergarten through twelfth grade in Manchester Township, in Ocean County, in the U.S. state of New Jersey.

The Manchester Township School District is also the receiving district for approximately 150 high school students from neighboring Lakehurst Borough, who attend as part of a sending/receiving relationship with the Lakehurst School District.

As of the 2024–25 school year, the district, comprised of six schools, had an enrollment of 2,916 students and 293.9 classroom teachers (on an FTE basis), for a student–teacher ratio of 9.9:1.

The district had been classified by the New Jersey Department of Education as being in District Factor Group "B", the second lowest of eight groupings. District Factor Groups organize districts statewide to allow comparison by common socioeconomic characteristics of the local districts. From lowest socioeconomic status to highest, the categories are A, B, CD, DE, FG, GH, I and J.

== Attendance boundary ==
The district includes high school students from the Lakehurst component of Joint Base McGuire–Dix–Lakehurst.

== Schools ==
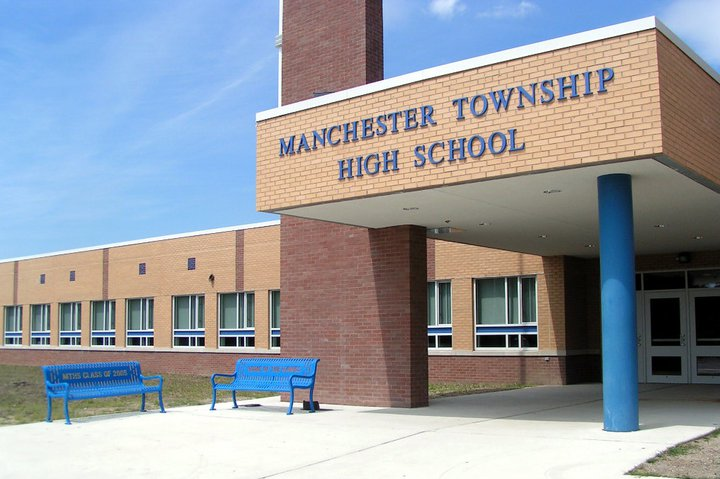
Manchester Township High School

Schools in the district (with 2024–25 enrollment data from the National Center for Education Statistics) are:

Elementary schools

- Manchester Township Elementary School with 573 students in grades PreK–5
  - Ellen Healy, principal
- Ridgeway Elementary School with 476 students in grades PreK–5
  - Sarah Thiffault, principal
- Whiting Elementary School with 266 students in grades PreK–5
  - Evelyn Swift, principal

Middle school

- Manchester Township Middle School with 586 students in grades 6–8
  - Anthony Giaconia

High school

- Manchester Township High School with 947 students in grades 9–12
  - Alex George, interim principal

Other

- Regional Day School with 56 students in grades PreK-12, serves low incidence handicapped children
  - Lisa Michallis, principal

== Administration ==
Core members of the district's administration are:

- Diane Pedroza, superintendent
- Craig A. Lorentzen, business administrator and board secretary

== Board of education ==
The district's board of education, comprised of seven members, sets policy and oversees the fiscal and educational operation of the district through its administration. As a Type II school district, the board's trustees are elected directly by voters to serve three-year terms of office on a staggered basis, with either two or three seats up for election each year held (since 2013) as part of the November general election. The board appoints a superintendent to oversee the district's day-to-day operations and a business administrator to supervise the business functions of the district. An eighth member represents the Lakehurst sending district.
