= Leilani Correa =

American basketball player (born 2001)

Personal information
- Born: May 5, 2001 (age 24) Lakehurst, New Jersey, U.S.
- Listed height: 6 ft 0 in (1.83 m)

Career information
- High school: Manchester Township High School
- College: St. John's Red Storm (2019–2022); Florida Gators (2022–2024)
- WNBA draft: 2024: 3rd round, 27th overall pick
- Drafted by: Indiana Fever
- Position: Guard

Career history
- 2024: Panteras de Aguascalientes
- 2024–present: Montañeras de Morovis

Career highlights
- SEC Sixth Player of the Year (2024); 2x First-team All-Big East (2021, 2022); Big East Sixth Player of the Year (2020); Big East All-Freshman Team (2020)
- Stats at WNBA.com
- Stats at Basketball Reference

Leilani Anais Correa (born May 5, 2001) is an American basketball player who is a free agent. She was drafted by the Indiana Fever in the 2024 WNBA draft. She played college basketball for the St. John's Red Storm and the Florida Gators.

== Early life ==
Correa was born in Lakehurst, New Jersey, United States. She is of Puerto Rican descent and has family on the island. She has three younger brothers. She attended and played basketball for her senior year at Manchester Township High School in Manchester Township, New Jersey, after transferring from Rutgers Preparatory School.

== College career ==
Correa played three seasons at St. John's University and two seasons at the University of Florida.

In her freshman season at St. John's, she averaged 12.8 points per game (ppg), which placed her second among rookies in the Big East Conference. She averaged 5.1 rebounds and 1.3 steals per game, and scored a season-high 33 points in the game against Army, tying the program's rookie record. By the end of the season, she was given the Big East Sixth-Woman Award and named unanimously to the Big East All-Freshman Team and All-Tournament Team, as well as the All-Met Third Team Selection.

In the 2020–21 season, she set a program record of three consecutive 30-point performances, setting a new career-high of 387 points over 22 games. She was the 11th-highest single-season scoring average in the school history with 17.6 points per game. Correa became the only player in program history to record 30 or more points eight times, and the first to do so since the Big East realigned. She averaged 5.4 rebounds and 2.7 assists per game over the season.

In her final year at St. John's, her junior season, she led the team with a 17.3 ppg average, along with 5.3 rebounds, 2.5 assists, and 1.2 steals per game. She was named to the All-Big East First team selection.

After transferring to the University of Florida for her senior season in 2022–23, she started in 6 games and played in 27 total. She had a 32.55% rate of scoring from threes (37-in-144) and tallied up 98 rebounds that season. She recorded 41 steals and 8 blocks, and finished the season with 318 points at an average of 11.8 per game.

In her final season, Correa led the Southeast Conference (SEC) in scoring with an average of 21.4 points per game in conference play and 16.9 points overall. She was named the SEC Sixth Woman of the Year and second-team All-SEC. She holds the record for highest amount of career points in Florida basketball's history, across both men's and women's programs, with 2,132 combined points.

== Professional career ==
Correa was selected in the third round, 27th overall, by the Indiana Fever in the 2024 WNBA draft. She was the 20th Florida player to be drafted into the WNBA and the third to be selected by the Fever. Fever head coach Christie Sides had been watching Correa since early on in her fifth college season, and described her as, "She's long, she's athletic." On May 10, 2024, Correa was released by the Fever.
