= Sarri Singer =

American activist

Sarri Singer is an American activist who founded and directs Strength to Strength, an international nonprofit organization that provides peer support, resilience programming, and long-term recovery resources for victims of terrorism.

== Early life and education ==
Singer was born and grew up in Lakewood Township, New Jersey, where she graduated from Lakewood High School. Her father is New Jersey State Senator Robert Singer. She studied at Lander College for Women, a division of Touro University. She earned a Master’s degree in Peace and Conflict Resolution Studies from Rutgers University in 2021. Her graduate studies focused on conflict resolution, trauma, and approaches to post-conflict recovery.

== Career ==
Singer worked in an office two blocks from the World Trade Center until the 9/11 attack but overslept that morning and was not present during the attack.

In December 2001, Singer moved to Israel to volunteer and assist victims of terrorism.

In 2003, Singer was injured in a suicide bombing on a bus in Jerusalem, resulting in a two-week hospitalization. The attack killed 17 people. Hamas claimed responsibility for the attack. The 18-year-old suicide bomber had been recruited and radicalized by Hamas.

This shaped her advocacy work and public engagement on trauma recovery and victim support.

In 2013, Singer expressed concerns about Israel's plan to release 100 Palestinian prisoners convicted of terrorism.

In 2016, Singer testified before the national security subcommittee of the U.S. House Committee on Oversight and Government Reform, advocating for prosecution of perpetrators of terrorist attacks against Americans abroad.

Singer was named a special adviser to the UK National Emergencies Trust, a charity founded to respond to UK disasters after the Manchester Arena bombing, and the Westminster Bridge and London Bridge attacks.

She has participated in international commemorations and survivor gatherings, including events marking anniversaries of terrorist attacks such as the July 7, 2005 London bombings, March 11, 2004 Madrid bombings, and the 20th anniversary commemoration for the Omagh Bombing in Northern Ireland August 1998

=== Strength to Strength ===
In 2012, Singer founded Strength to Strength. The organization has supported victims of terrorist attacks in Oklahoma City, Boston, Northern Ireland, France, Israel, Algeria, Iraq, Spain, Uganda, Kenya, Liberia, and Argentina. The nonprofit provides free services to survivors, their families, and victims' relatives, focusing on peer-to-peer support through retreats, social gatherings, educational workshops, advocacy initiatives, speakers, and self-defense classes.

== Board Member ==
Singer sits on the boards of Resilience in Unity Project, World Confederation of United Zionists, Circle of Heroes, and the Neshama Project.
