= Mike Malast =

Michael Malast
- Malast in 2012
- Born: Michael Malast; November 14, 1983; Kingston, Pennsylvania, U.S.
- Died: June 26, 2018 (aged 34)
- Occupations: Entrepreneur, Sports Agent
- Website: MMAMELEE.com WorldClassMASS.com

Michael Malast (14 November 1983 – 26 June 2018) was an American entrepreneur, sports agent and fight promoter. In 2010 Malast was licensed by the Pennsylvania Department of State Athletic Commission as a promoter of mixed martial arts (MMA) becoming the youngest licensed promoter in the nation at age 26.

Malast got his start in the sport by launching "MMA Melee - Community of Combat" a social network dedicated to the progression of martial arts. The website focuses on building a solid foundation for professional and amateur athletes by sponsoring and securing bouts/competition for its members. Each month MMA Melee "Classifieds" section distributes over 100 new prize fighting jobs in various combat sports nationally and internationally. The website hosts over 25,000 fitness, exercise, training, self-defense and fight videos.

MMA Melee, INC. sponsors a professional and amateur fight team. The franchise holds a Team Record: 121–7 Win-Rate: 94% of the fighters representing the company. MMA Melee team members have competed in dozens of fight leagues around the world including the Ultimate Fighting Championship (UFC). Their endorsement deals have been seen on global networks such as Fox Sports, Spike TV, MTV2, NBCSN, HD Net, Comcast Sports & Pay-per-view.

In August 2009, Malast started managing judoka and professional mixed martial artist Jimy "The Kid" Hettes. Hettes was the first fighter sponsored by MMA Melee. Hettes was originally expected to make his UFC debut in December 2010 as part of The Ultimate Fighter: Team GSP vs. Team Koscheck Finale card on Spike TV; but Hettes was forced to turn down that opportunity due to a local promoters refusal to release him from a promotional contract which expired in 6 days. This urged Malast to secure a Promoters license through the Pennsylvania State Athletic Commission. Upon being issued his license Malast formed Martial Arts Super Sport - MASS Production, LLC his own MMA promotion that would grant him the authority to release fighters under contract with him to the UFC at any time.

Michael Malast was 34 when he died on Tuesday, June 26, 2018. He is interred at Maple Hill Cemetery, Hanover Twp, Pennsylvania.

== MASS - Martial Arts Super Sport - MMA Promotion ==
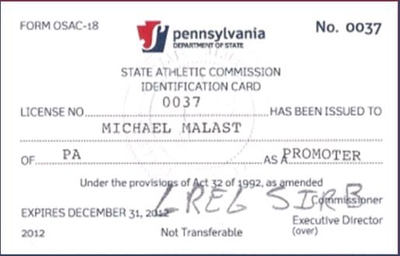
Department of State Licensed by PA Athletic Commission – Promoter

President/Promoter: Martial Arts Super Sport - MASS is a PRO/AM Mixed Martial Arts (MMA) League. MASS held its first event MASS Inauguration at the Mohegan Sun at Casey Plaza on July 16, 2011, which featured Jimy Hettes vs. Jacob Kirwan as the main event. Hettes defeated Kirwan in the 2nd round via submission (triangle choke) winning the MMA Melee - MASS Featherweight Championship Belt. That night immediately following the event Malast secured a six figure multi-fight deal for Hettes with the world leading mixed martial arts (MMA) organization the Ultimate Fighting Championship (UFC). On August 14, 2011, filling in as a late replacement for an injured Leonard Garcia, with 10 days notice Hettes made his UFC debut at the Bradley Center in Milwaukee, Wisconsin during UFC Live: Hardy vs. Lytle (also known as UFC on Versus 5) against Alex Caceres. Hettes won via submission (rear naked choke) at 3:12 of round 2.

Malast managed and held promotional contracts for several top prospects that went on to compete in other world class organizations. T-Rex Harris the 2nd fighter managed by Malast won his pro debut at MASS Inauguration. Harris was the Main Event for MASS 2 - Night for the Troops on March 24, 2012, at the Kingston Armory. Harris then signed to the WSOF - World Series of Fighting which broadcasts on NBCSN. MASS Inauguration "Fight of the Night" award winner Rich Patishnock also signed to WSOF after MASS. Patishnock fought for the vacant WSOF Lightweight Belt but was defeated by Justin Gaethje 18-0 who is the current #5 ranked UFC Lightweight in the world. Jacob Kirwan, Dave Morgan, Rich Patishnock and Jay Haas all signed with Viacom owned Bellator MMA after being promoted by MASS.

== United Fight Alliance – UFA Television Network ==
Malast was the head of global syndication & advertising at UFA. United Fight Alliance is an umbrella sports television network. Broadcasting on HBO PLUS, Comcast, DirecTV, Dish Network, Root Sports, AT&T Sportsnet, Sportsnet New York - SNY, Tuff TV and PUNCH TV etc.

== Boss Entertainment – Management Agency ==
OWNER/AGENT

Agency Clients: Athletes & Entertainers

Manager to top undefeated UFC featherweight Jimy "The Kid" Hettes 14-0 (10-0 pro) 10 x 1st Round Submissions. - Zuffa, LLC - MMA Melee (MASS) Featherweight Champion, PA Cage Fight Series Featherweight Champion, ICF Lightweight Champion

Ervani "Bad Boy" Rodrigo Melonio - 23-1 (Sherdog 14–1) Flyweight - 22 Years Old - Brazil.

Sean "The Destroyer" Loeffer - 32-5 Middleweight - UFC VET - Gladiator in the Cage - King of the Cage Champion seanloeffler.com

T-Rex Harris - Golden Gloves Champion, Summer Gloves Champion - WSOF Middleweight Contender & ECCC Light Heavyweight Champion, GOTC Middleweight Champion.

Elder "Psycho" Ramos - Ruckus in the Cage Middleweight Champion, Operation Octagon Middleweight Champion, Strike Off Welterweight Champion, TAC Welterweight Champion

Steve Mytych - Bantamweight - 2x NCAA All American, Most wins in Drexel University History

Jay Haas - Featherweight - Prospect Bellator MMA - Viacom.

Exclusive Rights: Licensing and Manufacturing of US Patents.

== MMA Melee - Community of Combat ==
=== Team record ===
121–7 WIN-RATE: 94%

Team vs. Opponent – Date – Location – Result
Jimy "The Kid" Hettes vs. Bobby Gorham December 6, 2009 Scranton, PA WIN

Joe Fye vs. Sean Haines December 6, 2009 Scranton, PA WIN

Derek "The Pipe" Leyrer vs. Michael Alfaro June 20, 2009 Rahway, NJ WIN

Jimy "The Kid" Hettes vs. Nick Gentile August 28, 2009 Hamburg, PA WIN

Jimy "The Kid" Hettes vs. Steven Baker October 24, 2009 Baltimore, MD WIN

Kris McCray vs. Marcus Ajian April 11, 2009 Glen Burnie, MD WIN

Justin "The Butcher" Hickey vs. Steven Baker April 11, 2009 Glen Burnie, MD WIN

Ravon "Charm City Bad Boy" Dixon vs. Migo DeOcampo April 11, 2009 Sterling, VA WIN

Elder Ramos vs. Adrian Belcarris July 11, 2009 Sterling, VA WIN

Richie Gates vs. James Rodriquez November 27, 2009 Scranton, PA WIN

Joe Fye vs. Mike Bannon November 27, 2009 Scranton, PA Loss

Jimy "The Kid" Hettes vs. Justin Haas November 27, 2009 Scranton, PA WIN

Adrian Belcarris vs. Donald Crawford, JR December 18, 2009 Greencastle, PA Loss

Chris "No Limits" Lancop vs. Luke Sheer December 19, 2009 Flint, MI WIN

Ravon "Charm City Bad Boy" Dixon vs. Tim Kaminsky June 3, 2010 Winchester, VA WIN

Jimy "The Kid" Hettes vs. James "Binky" Jones March 24, 2010 Baltimore, MD WIN

Justin "The Butcher" Hickey vs. Brett Thomas March 24, 2010 Baltimore, MD WIN

Jay Haas vs. Timothy Wade April 15, 2010 York, PA WIN

Ravon "Charm City Bad Boy" Dixon vs. Jose Yanes April 24, 2010 Winchester, VA WIN

Joe Fye vs. Nate Vantassel April 24, 2010 Winchester, VA WIN

Joe Stripling vs. Adrian Belcarris April 30, 2010 Pikesville, MD WIN

Derek "The Pipe" Leyrer vs. Joe Harrison January 5, 2010 Leesburg, VA WIN

Joe Stripling vs. Robert Corpora May 14, 2010 Philadelphia, PA WIN

Justin "The Butcher" Hickey vs. Dustin Pague May 22, 2010 Fairfax, VA Loss

Steven Baker vs. Odis Websey June 19, 2010 Ocean City, MD WIN

Jay Haas vs. Noe Quintanilla June 26, 2010 Harrisburg, PA WIN

Richie Gates vs. Christopher Stone August 13, 2010 Scranton, PA WIN

Jimy "The Kid" Hettes vs. Dwayne Shelton August 13, 2010 Scranton, PA WIN

Ravon "Charm City Bad Boy" Dixon vs. Jason Harmon August 14, 2010 Winchester, VA WIN

Richie Smith vs. Kenny Kirk August 14, 2010 Georgetown, DE WIN

James "Ragin Cajun" Francis vs. Melvin Smith September 28, 2010 Ocala, FL WIN

James "Ragin Cajun" Francis vs. Murillo Silva February 10, 2010 Ocala, FL WIN

Joe Stripling vs. Dave Concepcion October 16, 2010 Philadelphia, PA WIN

Justin "Skiz" Scott vs. Remington Miles December 11, 2010 York, PA WIN

Alicia Haag vs. Jesse Lee Kline December 11, 2010 York, PA WIN

Richie Smith vs. Kenny Kirk 2 11 December 2010 Georgetown, DE WIN

Jay Haas vs. Noe Quintanilla 3 11 December 2010 York, PA WIN

Lewis "The Beast" Rumsey vs. Don Cioffi JR December 11, 2010 York, PA WIN

Elder Ramos vs. Dan Daniecki November 13, 2010 Baltimore, MD Loss

Bruce Lee Baker vs. Mike Haines November 13, 2010 Harrington, DE WIN

Alicia Haag vs. Jesse Lee Kline November 26, 2010 Scranton, PA WIN

Jimy "The Kid" Hettes vs. George Sheppard November 26, 2010 Scranton, PA WIN

James "Ragin Cajun" Francis vs. Mark Deford November 30, 2010 Ocala, FL WIN

Joe Stripling vs. Erik Purcell March 12, 2010 Philadelphia, PA WIN

T-Rex Harris vs. Charles Fox December 18, 2010 Manassas, VA WIN

Jay Haas vs. Stephen Franklin January 29, 2011 Chambersburg, PA WIN

Lewis "The Beast" Rumsey vs. William Bookwalter February 19, 2011 York, PA WIN

T-Rex Harris vs. Nicholas Piegari May 3, 2011 Hanover, PA WIN

Mark Krumrine vs. Gary Stotler May 3, 2011 Hanover, PA WIN

Jay Haas vs. Michael Phillips March 25, 2011 Harrisburg, PA WIN

Richie Gates vs. Phillip Parrish March 26, 2011 Scranton, PA WIN

James Cianci vs. Patrick Paulo March 26, 2011 Scranton, PA WIN

Alicia Haag vs. Rachel Sazoff January 4, 2011 Oaks, PA WIN

Mike Zola vs. Carl Van Hekle February 4, 2011 Harrington, DE WIN

T-Rex Harris vs. Duane Shelton April 15, 2011 Stroudsburg, PA WIN

Lewis "The Beast" Rumsey vs. John Doyle April 15, 2011 Stroudsburg, PA WIN

Steven Baker vs. Jafari Vanier April 30, 2011 Baltimore, MD WIN

Jay Haas vs. James "Binky" Jones April 30, 2011 Baltimore, MD Loss

Joe Fye vs. Anthony Vitulli March 6, 2011 Harrington, DE WIN

Eddie Spiker vs. Matthew Lozano March 6, 2011 Lancaster, PA WIN

Aaron Perez vs. Mark Giblin April 6, 2011 Harrington, DE WIN

Mike Zola vs. Donta Finney April 6, 2011 Harrington, DE WIN

Lewis "The Beast" Rumsey vs. Chris Sydnor April 6, 2011 Newtown, PA WIN

Jay Haas vs. Steve McCabe April 6, 2011 Newtown, PA WIN

Alejandro Zea vs. Anthony Rodriguez April 6, 2011 Harrington, DE WIN

Dave Spadell JR vs. Jason Colarusso June 24, 2011 Scranton, PA WIN

Jimy "The Kid" Hettes vs. Jacob Kirwan July 16, 2011 Wilkes-Barre, PA WIN

T-Rex Harris vs. Chase Owens July 16, 2011 Wilkes-Barre, PA WIN

James Cianci vs. Ryan Harder July 16, 2011 Wilkes-Barre, PA WIN

Jay Haas vs. Nicolas Blesser July 16, 2011 Wilkes-Barre, PA WIN

Will Weber vs. Anthony McGlynn July 16, 2011 Wilkes-Barre, PA WIN

Mike Zola vs. John Ortiz July 16, 2011 Wilkes-Barre, PA WIN

Dave Spadell JR vs. Jeremiah Wells July 16, 2011 Wilkes-Barre, PA WIN

Steve Mytych vs. Amel Beharovic July 16, 2011 Wilkes-Barre, PA WIN

Rich Patishnock vs. Diego Peclat July 16, 2011 Wilkes-Barre, PA WIN

Jimy "The Kid" Hettes vs. Alex Careles August 14, 2011 Milwaukee, WI WIN

Noe Quintanilla vs. Biff Walizer February 9, 2011 Lock Haven, PA WIN

Steven Baker vs. Kyle Dolan February 9, 2011 Lock Haven, PA WIN

Joe Fye vs. Dennis Maldonado March 9, 2011 Kingston, PA WIN

Bruce Lee Baker vs. Christopher Clark October 9, 2011 Harrington, DE WIN

Lewis "The Beast" Rumsey vs. Cornelius Murray September 30, 2011 Newtown, PA WIN

Mark Krumrine vs. Edwin Leiva January 10, 2011 York, PA WIN

Lewis "The Beast" Rumsey vs. Joey Kirwan October 15, 2011 Atlantic City, NJ Loss

T-Rex Harris vs. Tyler Scott October 22, 2011 Philadelphia, PA WIN

Kris McCray vs. Kevin Nowaczyk May 11, 2011 Valparaiso, IN WIN

Richie Gates vs. Anthony McGlynn November 25, 2011 Scranton, PA WIN

Lewis "The Beast" Rumsey vs. Chase Owens November 25, 2011 Scranton, PA WIN

Kris McCray vs. Gemiyale Adkins November 25, 2011 Scranton, PA WIN

T-Rex Harris vs. Ariel Sepulveda October 12, 2011 Atlantic City, NJ Loss

Jimy "The Kid" Hettes vs. Nam Phan December 30, 2011 Las Vegas, NV WIN

Elder Ramos vs. Adam Sepulveda July 1, 2012 Williamson, WV WIN

Will Weber vs. Brendan Boyle March 24, 2012 Wilkes-Barre, PA WIN

Dave Morgan vs. Arthur Parker March 24, 2012 Wilkes-Barre, PA WIN

T-Rex Harris vs. Moses Mccraney March 24, 2012 Wilkes-Barre, PA WIN

Elder Ramos vs. James Watts December 5, 2012 Wilkes-Barre, PA WIN

Mike Zola vs. Billy Magliane May 19, 2012 Olyphant, PA WIN

Ravon "Charm City Bad Boy" Dixon vs. James Riff July 14, 2012 Winchester, VA WIN

Elder Ramos vs. Jeremy Boardwine October 13, 2012 Sterling, VA WIN

Bruce Lee Baker vs. Santos Escriban Jr. October 11, 2012 Harrington, DE WIN

Shane Mears vs. Jebarri Weekes October 11, 2012 Harrington, DE WIN

Elder Ramos vs. Bryan Lane February 16, 2013 Richmond, VA WIN

Elder Ramos vs. John Bryant December 7, 2013 Woodbridge, VA WIN

Elder Ramos vs. Devon Mosley July 6, 2014 Woodbridge, VA WIN

Sean "The Destroyer" Loeffler vs. Travis McCullough June 20, 2014 Twentynine Palms, CA WIN

Elder Ramos vs. Mark Strickland December 7, 2014 Hayes, VA WIN

Tim Fields vs. Austin Shockley August 23, 2014 Laurel, DE WIN

Blaine Peters vs. Chaning Spriggs August 23, 2014 Laurel, DE WIN

Sean "The Destroyer" Loeffler vs. "Lil Bear" Johnson August 24, 2014 El Cajon, CA WIN

Abdiel Velazquez vs. Cleveland Mclean June 9, 2014 Jacksonville, FL WIN

Elder Ramos vs. Wesley Golden June 9, 2014 McDonough, GA WIN

Diego Peclat vs. Kurban Jiang September 21, 2014 Dalian, Dalian China WIN

Tim Fields vs. Lichtenfels Miliford, DE November 10, 2014 WIN

Abdiel Velazquez vs. Dewaine Christmas November 21, 2014 Tampa, FL WIN

Abdiel Velazquez vs. Jamie Alvarez March 13, 2015 Miami, FL WIN

Sean "The Destroyer" Loeffler vs. Ronald LeBreton Jr. March 21, 2015 Valley Center, CA WIN

Blaine Peters vs. Peter Kim April 25, 2015 Harrington, DE WIN

Abdiel Velazquez vs. Brantley Furr 7/10/15 Jacksonville, FL WIN

Sean "The Destroyer" Loeffler vs. Brandon Crespin 8/22/15 San Diego, CA WIN

Kris McCray vs. Willian Ward 10/3/15 Fairfax, VA WIN

Sean "The Destroyer" Loeffler vs. Johnny Ramirez 10/17/15 Indianapolis, IN WIN

Diego Peclat vs. Raymond Camp 11/13/15 Ft. Lauderdale, FL WIN

Austin Lingo vs. Edgar Monarrez 4/2/16 Arlington, TX WIN

Sean "The Destroyer" Loeffler vs. Aaron Brink 4/2/16 El Cajon, CA WIN
