= Kevin Malast =

American football player (born 1986)

No. 57, 58, 50
- Position: Linebacker

Personal information
- Born: June 6, 1986 (age 40); Manchester Township, New Jersey, U.S.
- Listed height: 6 ft 1 in (1.85 m)
- Listed weight: 233 lb (106 kg)

Career information
- High school: Manchester Township High School
- College: Rutgers
- NFL draft: 2009: undrafted

Career history
- Chicago Bears (2009−2010)*; Tennessee Titans (2011)*; Jacksonville Jaguars (2011)*; Tennessee Titans (2011−2012)
- * Offseason or practice squad member only

Career NFL statistics
- Total tackles: 2
- Stats at Pro Football Reference

Kevin Malast (born June 6, 1986) is an American former professional football player who was a linebacker in the National Football League (NFL). He was signed by the Chicago Bears as an undrafted free agent in 2009. He played college football for the Rutgers Scarlet Knights.

Malast grew up in Manchester Township, New Jersey, and played football at Manchester Township High School.

He was also a member of the Jacksonville Jaguars and Tennessee Titans.
