= Lakehurst, New Jersey =

Borough in Ocean County, New Jersey, US

- Borough
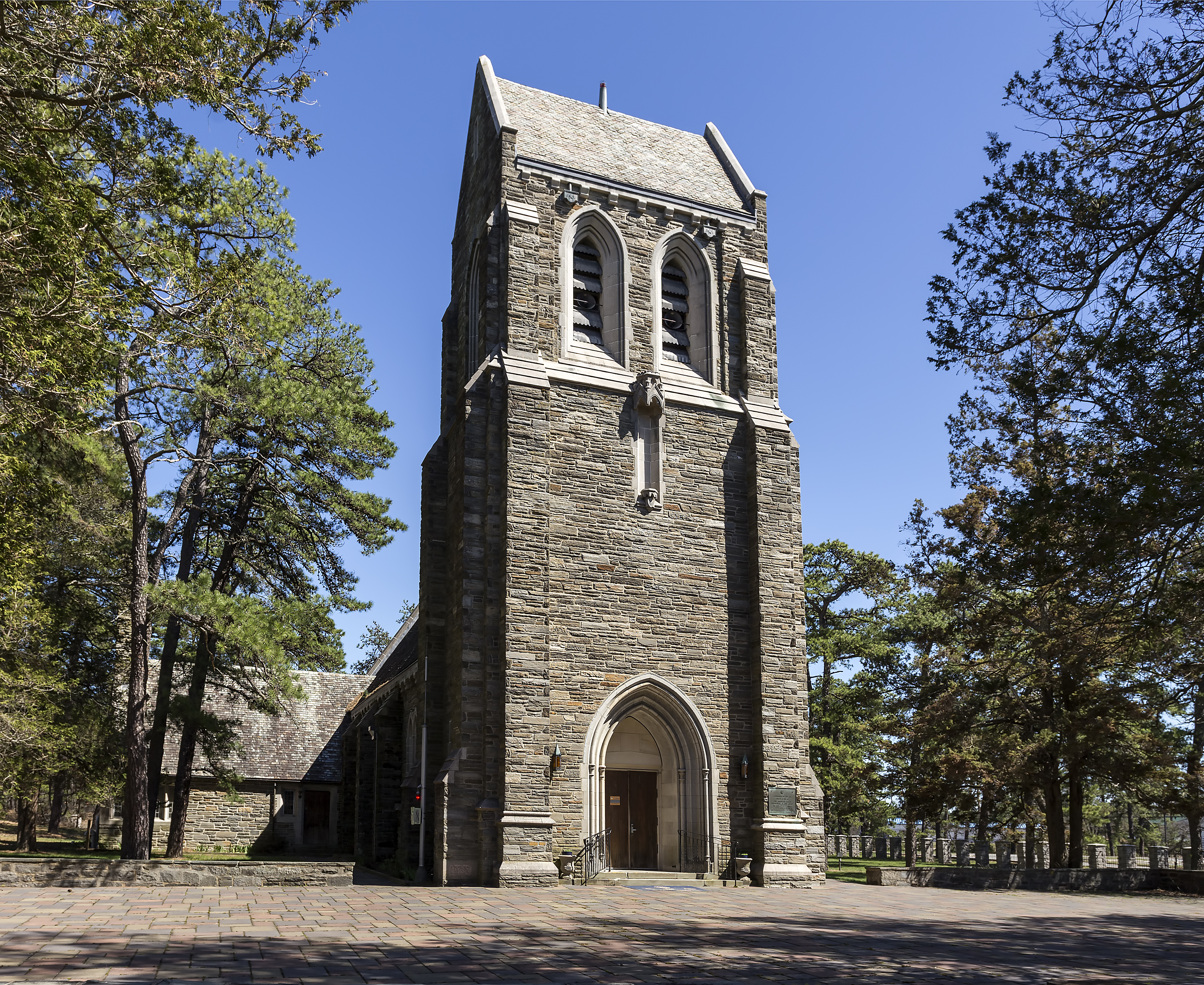
- Cathedral of the Air

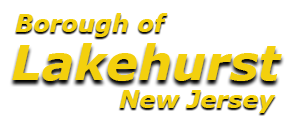
- wordmark logo
- Motto: "Airship Capital of the World"
- Location of Lakehurst in Ocean County highlighted in red (right). Inset map: Location of Ocean County in New Jersey highlighted in orange (left).

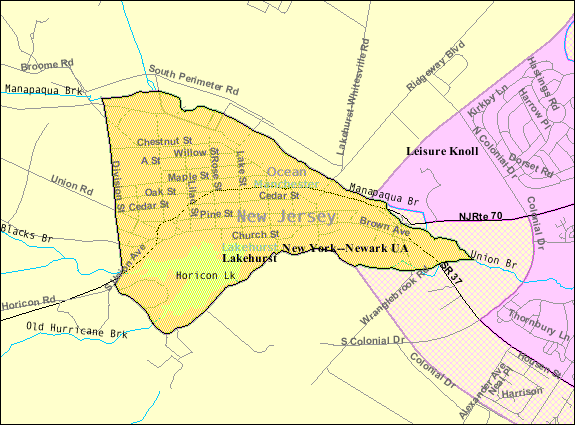
- Census Bureau map of Lakehurst, New Jersey

- Location in Ocean County Location in New Jersey Location in the United States
- Coordinates: 40.013119°N 74.320356°W
- Country: United States
- State: New Jersey
- County: Ocean
- Incorporated: April 7, 1921

Government
  - Type: Borough
  - Body: Borough Council
  - Mayor: Harry Robbins (R, term ends December 31, 2027)
  - Municipal clerk: Maryanne Capasso

Area
  - Total: 0.99 sq mi (2.56 km^{2})
  - Land: 0.90 sq mi (2.32 km^{2})
  - Water: 0.093 sq mi (0.24 km^{2}) 9.39%
  - Rank: 501st of 565 in state 25th of 33 in county
- Elevation: 66 ft (20 m)

Population (2020)
  - Total: 2,636
  - Estimate (2023): 2,703
  - Rank: 462nd of 565 in state 19th of 33 in county
  - Density: 2,944.8/sq mi (1,137.0/km^{2})
  - Rank: 220th of 565 in state 9th of 33 in county
- Time zone: UTC−05:00 (Eastern (EST))
  - Summer (DST): UTC−04:00 (Eastern (EDT))
- ZIP Codes: 08733, 08759
- Area code: 732
- FIPS code: 3402937770
- GNIS feature ID: 0885270
- Website: lakehurst-nj.gov

Lakehurst is a borough in Ocean County, in the U.S. state of New Jersey. As of the 2020 United States census, the borough's population was 2,636, a decrease of 18 (−0.7%) from the 2010 census count of 2,654, which in turn reflected an increase of 132 (+5.2%) from the 2,522 counted in the 2000 census.

Lakehurst was incorporated as a borough by an act of the New Jersey Legislature on April 7, 1921, from portions of Manchester Township, based on the results of a referendum held on May 24, 1921. The borough is named for its location near lakes and woods.

== History ==
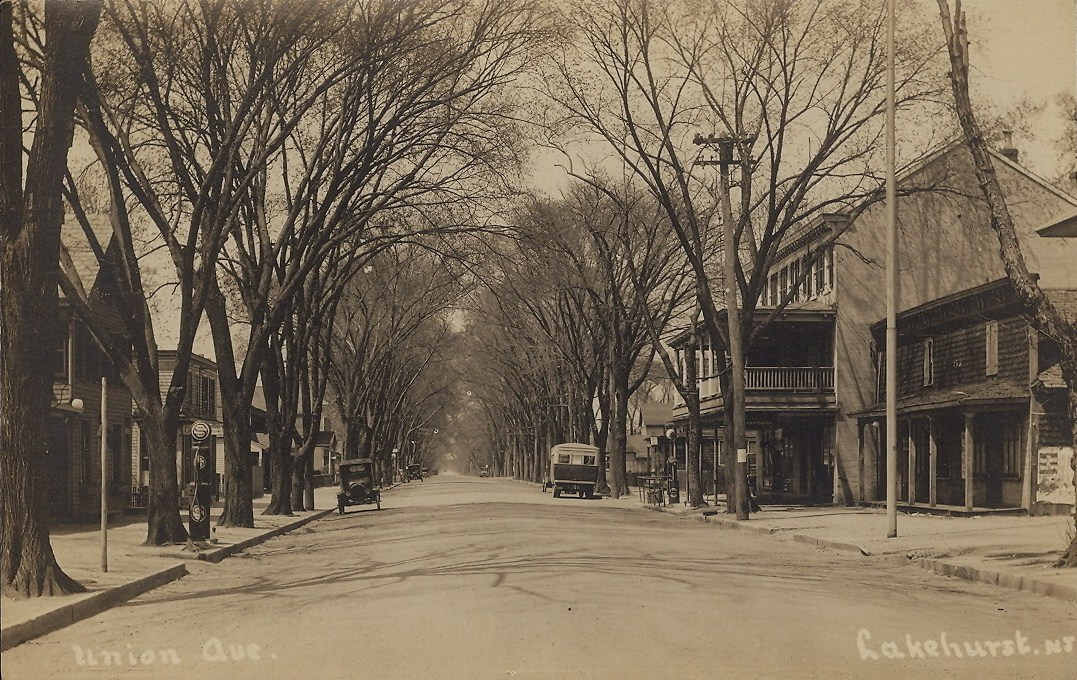
Union Avenue, about 1910

The community of Lakehurst first reached international recognition as a winter resort around the turn of the 20th century, following the opening of the Pine Tree Inn in 1898. In 1911, the rope factory in the town burned down, prompting the formation of a volunteer fire department.

The Hindenburg disaster, occurred on May 6, 1937; the German zeppelin Hindenburg arriving from Frankfurt am Main caught fire at the Lakehurst Naval Air Station, which is located in Manchester Township (not in the borough of Lakehurst).

== Geography ==
According to the United States Census Bureau, the borough had a total area of 0.99 square miles (2.56 km^{2}), including 0.90 square miles (2.32 km^{2}) of land and 0.09 square miles (0.24 km^{2}) of water (9.39%).

The borough's lake, Lake Horicon, existed prior to 1942, as clearly shown in aerial photographs from 1940 and 1931 and topographical maps from 1912. The cedar water lake remains stream-fed.

Lakehurst is completely surrounded by Manchester Township, making it part of 21 pairs of "doughnut towns" in the state, where one municipality entirely surrounds another.

The borough is one of 11 municipalities in Ocean County that are part of the Toms River watershed.

=== Climate ===
The climate in this area is characterized by hot, humid summers and generally mild to cool winters. According to the Köppen Climate Classification system, Lakehurst has a humid subtropical climate, abbreviated "Cfa" on climate maps.

== Demographics ==
Historical population
Census	Pop.	Note	%±
1880	592		—
1890	717		21.1%
1930	947		—
1940	827		−12.7%
1950	1,518		83.6%
1960	2,780		83.1%
1970	2,641		−5.0%
1980	2,908		10.1%
1990	3,078		5.8%
2000	2,522		−18.1%
2010	2,654		5.2%
2020	2,636		−0.7%
2023 (est.)	2,703	▲	2.5%
Population sources: 1880–1890 1930–2000; 1930 1940–2000; 2000 2010 2020

=== 2020 census ===
As of the 2020 census, Lakehurst had a population of 2,636. The median age was 37.0 years. 22.5% of residents were under the age of 18 and 11.6% of residents were 65 years of age or older. For every 100 females there were 100.9 males, and for every 100 females age 18 and over there were 96.5 males age 18 and over.

99.6% of residents lived in urban areas, while 0.4% lived in rural areas.

There were 908 households in Lakehurst, of which 38.0% had children under the age of 18 living in them. Of all households, 43.4% were married-couple households, 18.7% were households with a male householder and no spouse or partner present, and 27.4% were households with a female householder and no spouse or partner present. About 20.8% of all households were made up of individuals and 6.6% had someone living alone who was 65 years of age or older.

There were 979 housing units, of which 7.3% were vacant. The homeowner vacancy rate was 1.0% and the rental vacancy rate was 9.4%.

Racial composition as of the 2020 census
Race	Number	Percent
White	1,799	68.2%
Black or African American	259	9.8%
American Indian and Alaska Native	14	0.5%
Asian	105	4.0%
Native Hawaiian and Other Pacific Islander	0	0.0%
Some other race	184	7.0%
Two or more races	275	10.4%
Hispanic or Latino (of any race)	505	19.2%

=== 2010 census ===
The 2010 United States census counted 2,654 people, 881 households, and 662 families in the borough. The population density was 2,900.8 inhabitants per square mile (1,120.0/km^{2}). There were 943 housing units at an average density of 1,030.7 per square mile (398.0/km^{2}). The racial makeup was 77.24% (2,050) White, 10.81% (287) Black or African American, 0.64% (17) Native American, 2.11% (56) Asian, 0.23% (6) Pacific Islander, 3.65% (97) from other races, and 5.31% (141) from two or more races. Hispanic or Latino of any race were 13.07% (347) of the population.

Of the 881 households, 36.8% had children under the age of 18; 50.7% were married couples living together; 16.7% had a female householder with no husband present and 24.9% were non-families. Of all households, 18.5% were made up of individuals and 4.2% had someone living alone who was 65 years of age or older. The average household size was 3.01 and the average family size was 3.43.

28.4% of the population were under the age of 18, 10.1% from 18 to 24, 29.4% from 25 to 44, 25.2% from 45 to 64, and 7.0% who were 65 years of age or older. The median age was 31.9 years. For every 100 females, the population had 105.4 males. For every 100 females ages 18 and older there were 97.8 males.

The Census Bureau's 2006–2010 American Community Survey showed that (in 2010 inflation-adjusted dollars) median household income was $67,872 (with a margin of error of +/− $8,972) and the median family income was $67,838 (+/− $7,173). Males had a median income of $44,844 (+/− $8,788) versus $34,950 (+/− $7,557) for females. The per capita income for the borough was $27,171 (+/− $4,950). About 2.1% of families and 3.7% of the population were below the poverty line, including none of those under age 18 and 9.4% of those age 65 or over.

=== 2000 census ===
As of the 2000 United States census there were 870 households (662 of which were families of two or more) in the borough making up the total population of 2,522. The population density was 2,733.9 inhabitants per square mile (1,055.6/km^{2}). There were 961 housing units at an average density of 1,041.7 per square mile (402.2/km^{2}). The racial makeup of the borough was 84.22% White, 7.85% African American, 0.63% Native American, 2.34% Asian, 0.08% Pacific Islander, 2.74% from other races, and 2.14% from two or more races. Hispanic or Latino of any race were 7.97% of the population.

There were 870 households, out of which 41.4% had children under the age of 18 living with them, 57.5% were married couples living together, 13.4% had a female householder with no husband present, and 23.9% were non-families. 19.8% of all households were made up of individuals, and 6.6% had someone living alone who was 65 years of age or older. The average household size was 2.90 and the average family size was 3.33.

In the borough the population was spread out, with 30.6% under the age of 18, 8.0% from 18 to 24, 34.1% from 25 to 44, 19.4% from 45 to 64, and 8.0% who were 65 years of age or older. The median age was 32 years. For every 100 females, there were 106.6 males. For every 100 females age 18 and over, there were 100.3 males.

The median income for a household in the borough was $43,567, and the median income for a family was $48,833. Males had a median income of $35,403 versus $26,667 for females. The per capita income for the borough was $18,390. About 4.4% of families and 7.1% of the population were below the poverty line, including 7.6% of those under age 18 and 2.5% of those age 65 or over.

== Government ==
=== Local government ===
Lakehurst is governed under the borough form of New Jersey municipal government, which is used in 218 municipalities (of the 564) statewide, making it the most common form of government in New Jersey. The governing body is comprised of the mayor and the borough council, with all positions elected at-large on a partisan basis as part of the November general election. The mayor is elected directly by the voters to a four-year term of office. The borough council includes six members elected to serve three-year terms on a staggered basis, with two seats coming up for election each year in a three-year cycle. The borough form of government used by Lakehurst is a "weak mayor / strong council" government in which council members act as the legislative body with the mayor presiding at meetings and voting only in the event of a tie. The mayor can veto ordinances subject to an override by a two-thirds majority vote of the council. The mayor makes committee and liaison assignments for council members, and most appointments are made by the mayor with the advice and consent of the council.

As of 2025, the mayor of Lakehurst Borough is Republican Harry Robbins, whose term of office ends December 31, 2027. Members of the Lakehurst Borough Council are Council President Steven Oglesby (R, 2025), Jeffrey Emmons (R, 2027), Brian C. DiMeo (R, 2025), Bernadette Dugan (R, 2027; elected to serve an unexpired term), Patricia A. Hodges (R, 2026) and Robert McCarthy (R, 2026).

In March 2022, the borough council appointed Bernadette Dugan to the seat expiring in December 2024 that had been held by Gary Lowe until he died in office the previous January, just weeks after having taken office. Dugan will serve on an interim basis until the November 2022 general election, when voters will choose a candidate to fill the balance of the term of office.

In August 2015, the borough council selected former mayor Stephen F. Childers to fill the unexpired term ending in December 2016 of Glenn McComas, who had resigned from office the previous month as he was moving out of the borough.

=== Federal, state and county representation ===
Lakehurst is located in the 4th Congressional District and is part of New Jersey's 9th state legislative district.

For the 119th United States Congress, New Jersey's 4th congressional district is represented by Chris Smith (R, Manchester Township). New Jersey is represented in the United States Senate by Democrats Cory Booker (Newark, term ends 2027) and Andy Kim (Moorestown, term ends 2031).

For the 2026–2027 session, the 9th legislative district of the New Jersey Legislature is represented in the State Senate by Carmen Amato (R, Berkeley Township) and in the General Assembly by Greg Myhre (R, Stafford Township) and Brian E. Rumpf (R, Little Egg Harbor Township).

Ocean County is governed by a Board of County Commissioners composed of five members who are elected on an at-large basis in partisan elections and serving staggered three-year terms of office, with either one or two seats coming up for election each year as part of the November general election. At an annual reorganization held in the beginning of January, the board chooses a director and a deputy director from among its members. As of 2025, Ocean County's Commissioners (with party affiliation, term-end year and residence) are:

John P. Kelly (R, 2025, Eagleswood Township), Virginia E. Haines (R, 2025, Toms River), Robert Arace (R, Manchester Township, 2027) Jennifer Bacchione (R, Berkeley Township, 2027) and Frank Sadeghi (R, 2026, Toms River).

Constitutional officers elected on a countywide basis are: Clerk Scott M. Colabella (R, 2025, Barnegat Light), Sheriff Michael G. Mastronardy (R, 2025; Toms River) and Surrogate Jeffrey Moran (R, 2028, Beachwood).

=== Politics ===
As of March 2011, there were a total of 1,373 registered voters in Lakehurst, of which 254 (18.5%) were registered as Democrats, 295 (21.5%) were registered as Republicans and 823 (59.9%) were registered as Unaffiliated. There was one voter registered to another party. Among the borough's 2010 Census population, 51.7% (vs. 63.2% in Ocean County) were registered to vote, including 72.2% of those ages 18 and over (vs. 82.6% countywide).

Gubernatorial election results for Lakehurst
Year	Republican		Democratic		Third party(ies)	
Year	No.	%	No.	%	No.	%
2025	400	58.06%	283	41.07%	6	0.87%
2021	438	72.28%	160	26.40%	8	1.32%
2017	274	58.42%	182	38.81%	13	2.77%
2013	398	73.43%	136	25.09%	8	1.48%
2009	371	65.78%	145	25.71%	48	8.51%
2005	281	54.56%	201	39.03%	33	6.41%

In the 2012 presidential election, Democrat Barack Obama received 50.8% of the vote (438 cast), ahead of Republican Mitt Romney with 48.5% (418 votes), and other candidates with 0.7% (6 votes), among the 872 ballots cast by the borough's 1,480 registered voters (10 ballots were spoiled), for a turnout of 58.9%. In the 2008 presidential election, Republican John McCain received 49.5% of the vote (459 cast), ahead of Democrat Barack Obama with 47.7% (443 votes) and other candidates with 1.7% (16 votes), among the 928 ballots cast by the borough's 1,521 registered voters, for a turnout of 61.0%. In the 2004 presidential election, Republican George W. Bush received 58.8% of the vote (518 ballots cast), outpolling Democrat John Kerry with 39.8% (351 votes) and other candidates with 0.8% (12 votes), among the 881 ballots cast by the borough's 1,427 registered voters, for a turnout percentage of 61.7.

Presidential Elections Results
Year	Republican	Democratic	Third Parties
2024	62.9% 640	34.5% 351	2.6% 22
2020	59.7% 652	37.6% 410	2.7% 28
2016	59.7% 561	35.4% 332	4.9% 46
2012	48.5% 418	50.8% 438	0.7% 6
2008	49.5% 459	47.7% 443	1.7% 16
2004	58.8% 518	39.8% 351	0.8% 12

In the 2013 gubernatorial election, Republican Chris Christie received 73.4% of the vote (398 cast), ahead of Democrat Barbara Buono with 25.1% (136 votes), and other candidates with 1.5% (8 votes), among the 555 ballots cast by the borough's 1,461 registered voters (13 ballots were spoiled), for a turnout of 38.0%. In the 2009 gubernatorial election, Republican Chris Christie received 65.0% of the vote (371 ballots cast), ahead of Democrat Jon Corzine with 25.4% (145 votes), Independent Chris Daggett with 7.4% (42 votes) and other candidates with 1.1% (6 votes), among the 571 ballots cast by the borough's 1,469 registered voters, yielding a 38.9% turnout.

United States Senate election results for Lakehurst1
Year	Republican		Democratic		Third party(ies)	
Year	No.	%	No.	%	No.	%
2024	546	58.77%	366	39.40%	17	1.83%
2018	494	55.88%	360	40.72%	30	3.39%
2012	376	47.53%	392	49.56%	23	2.91%
2006	265	56.87%	178	38.20%	23	4.94%

United States Senate election results for Lakehurst2
Year	Republican		Democratic		Third party(ies)	
Year	No.	%	No.	%	No.	%
2020	613	58.55%	399	38.11%	35	3.34%
2014	225	54.48%	177	42.86%	11	2.66%
2013	183	63.10%	101	34.83%	6	2.07%
2008	425	51.52%	371	44.97%	29	3.52%

== Education ==
The Lakehurst School District serves students in public school for pre-kindergarten through eighth grade at Lakehurst Elementary School. As of the 2023–24 school year, the district, comprised of one school, had an enrollment of 406 students and 40.8 classroom teachers (on an FTE basis), for a student–teacher ratio of 10.0:1.

Public school students from Lakehurst in ninth through twelfth grades attend Manchester Township High School in Lakehurst, New Jersey as part of a sending/receiving relationship with the Manchester Township School District. As of the 2023–24 school year, the high school had an enrollment of 943 students and 86.0 classroom teachers (on an FTE basis), for a student–teacher ratio of 11.0:1.

== Transportation ==
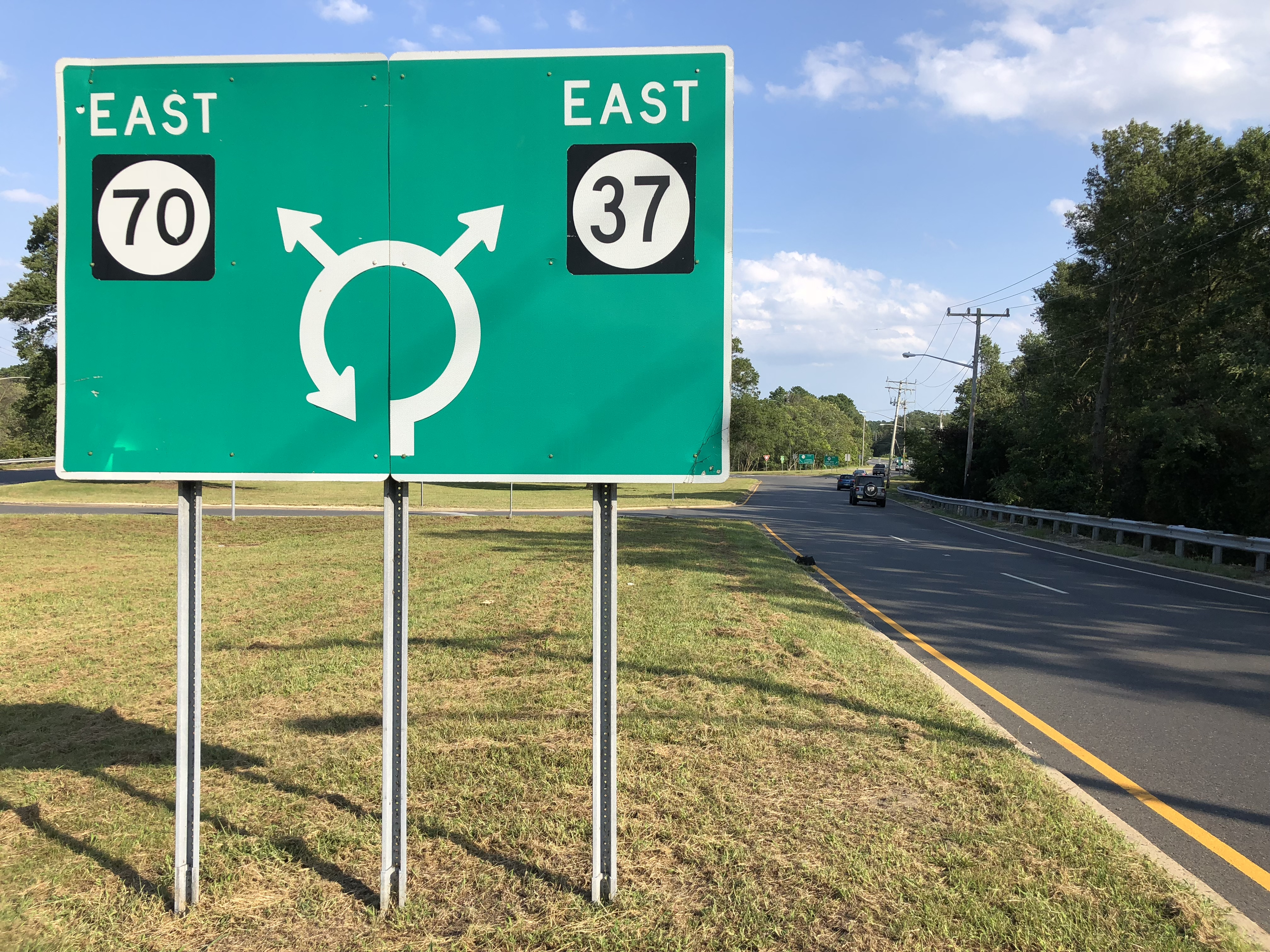
Route 70 at Route 37 in Lakehurst

=== Roads and highways ===
As of May 2010, the borough had a total of 13.55 miles (21.81 km) of roadways, of which 7.72 miles (12.42 km) were maintained by the municipality, 3.95 miles (6.36 km) by Ocean County and 1.88 miles (3.03 km) by the New Jersey Department of Transportation.

New Jersey Route 70 is the main highway through the borough, which lies at the western end of New Jersey Route 37. County Route 547 connects from the North after paralleling the eastern edge of the Lakehurst Maxfield Field portion of Joint Base McGuire-Dix-Lakehurst.

=== Public transportation ===
Ocean Ride local service is provided on the OC1A Whiting Express and the OC2 Manchester routes.

Lakehurst is located on the former Central Railroad of New Jersey Southern Division Main Line. The Barnegat Branch formerly extended from Lakehurst through Toms River and Beachwood down to Barnegat.

Lakehurst is being considered as the southern terminus of the planned NJ Transit Monmouth-Ocean-Middlesex Line, which would closely follow the CNJ line.

== Media ==
The Asbury Park Press provides daily news coverage of the community as does WOBM-FM radio. The government of the borough provides columns and commentary to The Manchester Times, which is one of seven weekly papers from Micromedia Publications; founded in 1995, the company was headquartered on Union Avenue in the borough until late 2019 when they moved to the Lakehurst Circle Center.

== Notable people ==
People who were born in, residents of, or otherwise closely associated with Lakehurst include:

- Thomas Barlow (1896–1983), one of the first professional basketball players, he was inducted as a member of the Basketball Hall of Fame in 1981
- Leilani Correa (born 2001), basketball player
- Rich Croushore (born 1970), former Major League Baseball pitcher who was born in Lakehurst when his father served in the U.S. Navy
- James S. Denton (1951–2018), publisher and editor of World Affairs and the director of the World Affairs Institute
- Marty Jannetty (born 1962), professional wrestler, best known as one-half of The Rockers in the World Wrestling Federation
- Abel Kiviat (1892–1991), silver medalist in the men's 1,500 m event at the 1912 Summer Olympics
- Juice Newton (born 1952), Grammy Award-winning American pop music and country singer
- Richard Shindell (born 1960), folk singer / songwriter
