= Jackson School District (New Jersey) =

School district in Ocean County, New Jersey, US

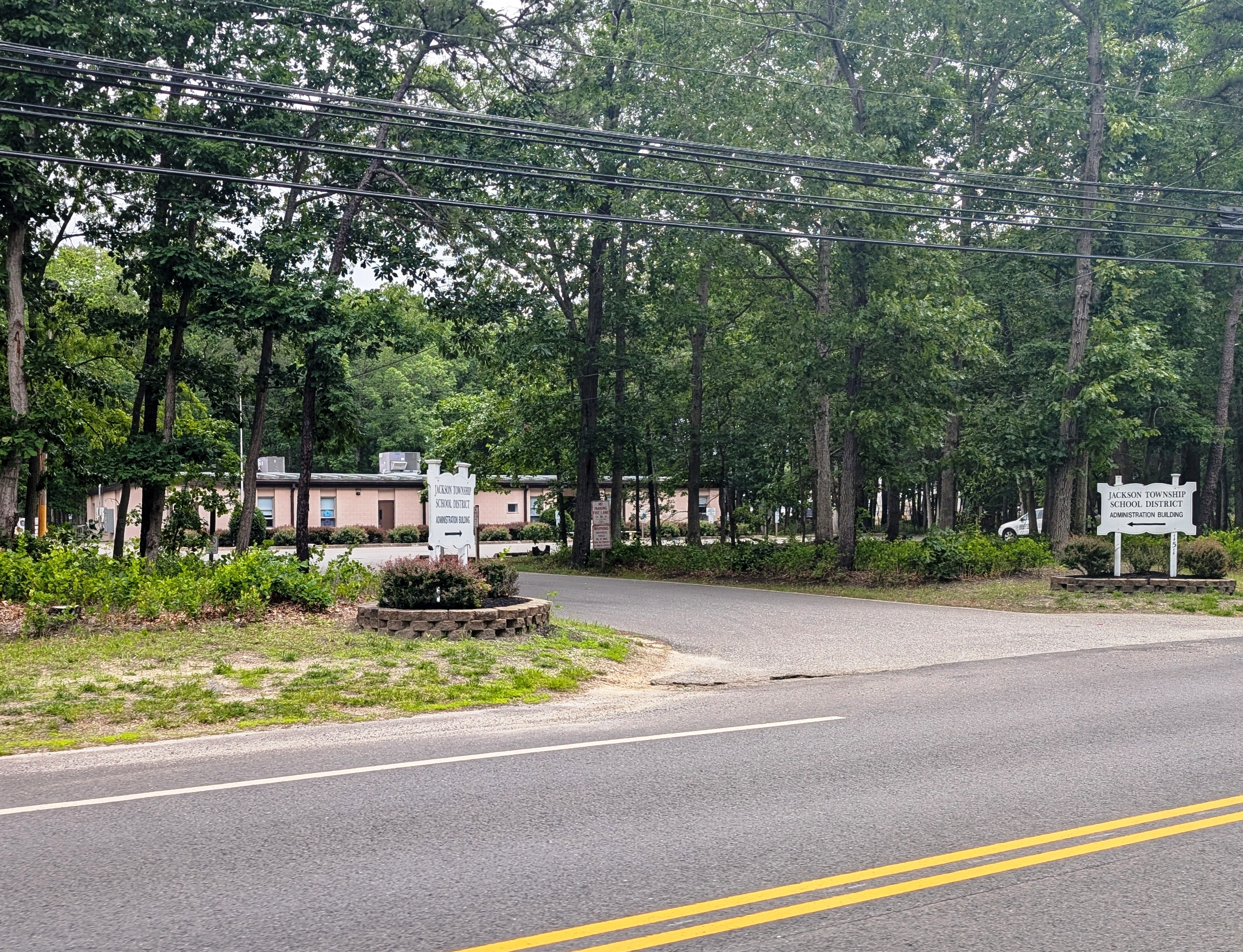
- District's Administration Building

Address
- 151 Don Connor Boulevard Jackson Township, Ocean County, New Jersey, 08527; United States
- Coordinates: 40.104849°N 74.344924°W

District information
- Grades: K-12
- Superintendent: Nicole Pormilli
- Business administrator: Daniel Baginski
- Schools: 10

Students and staff
- Enrollment: 7,535 (as of 2021–22)
- Faculty: 623.1 FTEs
- Student–teacher ratio: 12.1:1

Other information
- District Factor Group: DE
- Website: www.jacksonsd.org
Ind.	Per pupil	District spending	Rank (*)	K-12 average	%± vs. average
1A	Total Spending	$16,138	18	$18,891	−14.6%
1	Budgetary Cost	13,014	25	14,783	−12.0%
2	Classroom Instruction	7,609	13	8,763	−13.2%
6	Support Services	2,082	39	2,392	−13.0%
8	Administrative Cost	1,284	25	1,485	−13.5%
10	Operations & Maintenance	1,464	32	1,783	−17.9%
13	Extracurricular Activities	281	63	268	4.9%
16	Median Teacher Salary	57,850	15	64,043
Data from NJDoE 2014 Taxpayers' Guide to Education Spending. *Of K-12 districts with more than 3,500 students. Lowest spending=1; Highest=103

The Jackson School District is a comprehensive community public school district, serving students in kindergarten through twelfth grade from Jackson Township, in Ocean County, in the U.S. state of New Jersey. The district operates six elementary schools serving grades K-5, two middle schools and two high schools. In January 2015, the Jackson Board of Education voted to implement full-day kindergarten, which was introduced in September 2015.

As of the 2021–22 school year, the district, comprised of 10 schools, had an enrollment of 7,535 students and 623.1 classroom teachers (on an FTE basis), for a student–teacher ratio of 12.1:1.

== History ==
Switlik Elementary School opened in 1948 as the district's first central elementary school, marking the end of one-room schoolhouses.

In 1962, The Brookwood Elementary School opened. It would later be renamed after Sylvia Rosenauer, its first principal, in 1978.

Jackson High School (since renamed as Jackson Memorial High School) opened in September 1963 as the district's first high school with 700 students in grades 7–9, though other district school facilities were used on a temporary basis as the building that housed Jackson Junior-Senior High School wasn't completed and opened to students until the spring of 1964. Before the high school opened, students living in Jackson Township attended Lakewood High School as part of a sending/receiving relationship.

Johnson Elementary School opened in 1969. It was named after Howard C. Johnson, the first Jackson resident to receive a diploma. He graduated from Lakewood High School in 1901. That same year, the Lucy N. Holman Elementary School opened. It was named after a Switlik principal.

In 1973, the Carl W. Goetz Middle School opened.

In 1993, the McAuliffe Middle School opened, it was named after Christa McAuliffe, the first civilian teacher in space and a victim of the Space Shuttle Challenger disaster during a NASA mission on January 28, 1986. McAuliffe's mother was present when the school named after her daughter opened its doors for the first time.

In 2003, Elms Elementary School opened.

Jackson Liberty High School opened in September 2006 with 800 students in 9th and 10th grades. The school was constructed at a cost of $70 million (equivalent to $109.2 million in 2024) with a maximum capacity of 1,900 students in grades 9–12. The school is two stories high with 288,500 square feet (26,800 m^{2}) of floor space on a 150-acre (0.61 km^{2}) parcel of land, and features 85 classrooms, a 1,800-seat gymnasium and about a dozen athletic fields.

In May 2010, it was announced that the New Jersey Division on Civil Rights found probable cause against the Jackson school district for violating the New Jersey Law Against Discrimination by allowing a hostile environment to prevail against former Jackson Memorial High School student Daniel Jacobson. Jacobson, who is gay and Honduran, alleged that he was repeatedly harassed and threatened because of his sexual orientation and national origin.

In 2024, Rosenauer was sold for $13.1 million to Bais Yaakov, an all-girls Jewish school, as part of an effort to fill a budgetary gap.

In February 2025, The Jackson School district announced that it would close Christa McAuliffe Middle School at the end of the 2024-25 school year. It also announced that for the 2025–26 school year, all high school students would be attending Jackson Liberty High School, which will become Jackson Township High School, while the former Jackson Memorial High School would be repurposed into a school for grades 7 and 8. Carl W. Goetz Middle School would be reconfigured for grades 5 and 6.

In June 2025, the district sued the state of New Jersey, claiming that they were forced to close schools and eliminate jobs and programs as the result of "systemic and unconstitutional underfunding", including a $22.4 million decrease in state school aid over a seven-year period. A 15% decline in enrollment, which had dropped from almost 8,200 in the 2017–18 school year to fewer than 7,000 in 2024–25, has resulted in a drop in state aid. The district has seen rising busing costs for Orthodox Jewish children attending private schools. The school district is seeking compensation and a judgement that requires the state to revise the school funding formula.

The district had been classified by the New Jersey Department of Education as being in District Factor Group "DE", the fifth-highest of eight groupings. District Factor Groups organize districts statewide to allow comparison by common socioeconomic characteristics of the local districts. From lowest socioeconomic status to highest, the categories are A, B, CD, DE, FG, GH, I and J.

== Awards and recognition ==
For the 2001–02 school year, Christa McAuliffe Middle School was recognized with the National Blue Ribbon Award from the United States Department of Education, the highest honor that an American school can achieve.

== Schools ==
Schools in the district (with 2021–22 enrollment data from the National Center for Education Statistics) are:

Elementary schools

- Crawford-Rodriguez Elementary School (536 students; in grades PreK-5)
  - Ronald Polakowski, principal
- Elms Elementary School (627; PreK-5)
  - Michael Burgos, principal
- Lucy N. Holman Elementary School (484; PreK-5)
  - Richard Karas, principal
- Howard C. Johnson Elementary School (354; PreK-5)
  - Renee Pagano-Hein, principal
- Sylvia Rosenauer Elementary School (213; PreK-5)
  - Theresa Licitra, principal
- Switlik Elementary School (806; K-5)
  - Michael Raymond, principal

Middle school

- Carl W. Goetz Middle School (1,001; 6–8)
  - Carl Perino, principal
- Christa McAuliffe Middle School (759; 6–8)
  - Debra Phillips, principal

High school

- Jackson Liberty High School (1,129; 9–12)
  - Geoffrey Brignola, principal
- Jackson Memorial High School (1,568; 9–12)
  - Kevin DiEugenio, principal

== Administration ==
Core members of the district's administration are:

- Nicole Pormilli, superintendent of schools
- Daniel Baginski, business administrator and board secretary

== Board of education ==
The district's board of education, comprised of seven members, sets policy and oversees the fiscal and educational operation of the district through its administration. As a Type II school district, the board's trustees are elected directly by voters to serve three-year terms of office on a staggered basis, with either two or three seats up for election each year held (since 2012) as part of the November general election. The board appoints a superintendent to oversee the district's day-to-day operations and a business administrator to supervise the business functions of the district. As of 2025, the President of the board of education is Tina Kas.
