= Lakewood School District (New Jersey) =

School district in Ocean County, New Jersey, US

Address
- 1771 Madison Avenue Lakewood Township, Ocean County, New Jersey, 08701; United States
- Coordinates: 40.097308°N 74.208792°W

District information
- Grades: PreK-12
- Superintendent: Laura A. Winters
- Business administrator: Vacant
- Schools: 8

Students and staff
- Enrollment: 5,433 (as of 2021–22)
- Faculty: 511.0 FTEs
- Student–teacher ratio: 10.6:1

Other information
- District Factor Group: None
- Website: www.lakewoodpiners.org
Ind.	Per pupil	District spending	Rank (*)	K-12 average	%± vs. average
1A	Total Spending	$25,238	101	$18,891	33.6%
1	Budgetary Cost	12,517	12	14,783	−15.3%
2	Classroom Instruction	7,517	10	8,763	−14.2%
6	Support Services	2,520	68	2,392	5.4%
8	Administrative Cost	1,139	9	1,485	−23.3%
10	Operations & Maintenance	1,098	4	1,783	−38.4%
13	Extracurricular Activities	233	48	268	−13.1%
16	Median Teacher Salary	50,728	1	64,043
Data from NJDoE 2014 Taxpayers' Guide to Education Spending. *Of K-12 districts with more than 3,500 students. Lowest spending=1; Highest=103

The Lakewood School District is a comprehensive community public school district that serves students in pre-kindergarten through twelfth grade in Lakewood Township in Ocean County, in the U.S. state of New Jersey.

As of the 2021–22 school year, the district, comprising eight schools, had an enrollment of 5,433 students and 511.0 classroom teachers (on an FTE basis), for a student–teacher ratio of 10.6:1.

== History ==
The school district provided busing to 18,000 students enrolled at 74 yeshivas as of 2011, which by 2016 had grown to a private school population of 25,000, more than quadruple the number of public school students.

In March 2017, Superintendent Laura Winters stated that due to a proposed $14.7 million decrease of the district budget, the district would be "unable to provide students with a thorough and efficient education required by the New Jersey State Constitution." The proposed cuts may cause 120 teachers to lose their positions.

An appeals court ruled in March 2023 that the district was shortchanged in state funding, a condition that was aggravated by the costs of providing private-school busing and special education services to all eligible students. Based on data from the 2020 United States census, a majority of the township's population of 135,000 were under the age of 18, of which nearly 6,000 attended the district's schools and 30,000 were attending private schools.

== Demographics ==
As of 2017, most of the students are black and Latino/Hispanic, while many of the Orthodox Jewish township residents send their children to private Jewish schools.

== Schools ==
Schools in the district (with 2021–22 enrollment data from the National Center for Education Statistics) are:

Preschool

- Lakewood Early Childhood Center with 247 students in PreK
  - Sara Garfunkel, Supervisor of Early Childhood Center

Elementary schools

- Ella G. Clarke School with 375 students in grades 2–5
  - Ebony Rivera, principal
- Clifton Avenue School with 387 students in grades 2–5
  - Jessica Ring, principal
- Oak Street School with 633 students in grades 1–5
  - Joseph Schroepfer, principal
- Piner Elementary School with 415 students in grades PreK-1
  - Aleida Salguero, principal
- Spruce Street School with 384 students in grades PreK-1
  - Marcy Marshall, principal

Middle school

- Lakewood Middle School with 1,126 students in grades 6–8
  - Deb Mazzeo, principal

High school

- Lakewood High School with 1,458 students in grades 9–12
  - Richard Goldstein, principal

== Administration ==
Core members of the district's administration are:

- Laura A. Winters, superintendent of schools
- Vacant, business administrator and board secretary

== Board of education ==
The district's board of education, composed of nine members, sets policy and oversees the fiscal and educational operation of the district through its administration. As a Type II school district, the board's trustees are elected directly by voters to serve three-year terms of office on a staggered basis, with three seats up for election each year held (since 2013) as part of the November general election. The board appoints a superintendent to oversee the district's day-to-day operations and a business administrator to supervise the business functions of the district.
