= Lakewood High School (New Jersey) =

Public secondary school in Ocean County, New Jersey, United States

Location
- 855 Somerset Avenue; Lakewood, Ocean County, New Jersey 08701; United States; 40.100563°N 74.1953317°W

Information
- Type: Public
- School district: Lakewood School District
- NCES School ID: 340822004636
- Principal: Richard Goldstein
- Faculty: 95.0 FTEs
- Grades: 9 - 12
- Enrollment: 1,295 (as of 2024–25)
- Student to teacher ratio: 13.6:1
- Colors: Blue; White
- Athletics conference: Shore Conference
- Team name: Piners
- Newspaper: Pine Needle
- Yearbook: Pine Needle
- Website: lhs.lakewoodpiners.org

Lakewood High School is a four-year comprehensive public high school serving students in ninth through twelfth grades in Lakewood, Ocean County, in the U.S. state of New Jersey, operating as the lone secondary school of the Lakewood School District.

As of the 2024–25 school year, the school had an enrollment of 1,295 students and 95.0 classroom teachers (on an FTE basis), for a student–teacher ratio of 13.6:1. There were 1,046 students (80.8% of enrollment) eligible for free lunch and 146 (11.3% of students) eligible for reduced-cost lunch.

== History ==
During the first half of the 20th century, Ocean County was a rural area, with Lakewood and Toms River (then known as Dover Township) serving as the region's commercial hubs. During the 1950s the landscape of the region would slowly start to change as the construction of the Garden State Parkway allowed more families the opportunity to move to Ocean County and still commute to New York City and North Jersey. Until the 1960s and 1970s, Lakewood High School served as a regional high school for the communities of Jackson to the west, Howell to the north, and Manchester to the southwest. While each municipality had their own elementary school district, they would send their students to Lakewood High School as part of a sending/receiving relationship.

With the influx of people to the area Lakewood High School's Somerset Avenue facility (now Lakewood Middle School) started to become overcrowded, and by the 1960s Jackson, Howell and Manchester had both grown enough to warrant the construction of their own high schools. Jackson Memorial High School would open in 1963 and its new school building opened the following year. Howell High School (then known as Southern Freehold Regional High School) opened in 1964. By June 1964 overcrowding at Lakewood High School led the Lakewood School District to push to end the agreement under which 150 students from Manchester Township attended the high school. To help alleviate the overcrowding, a new Lakewood High School building was opened across the street from the old high school building in September 1971, housing students from Lakewood and Manchester. Manchester Township High School opened in September 1976, thus ending Lakewood High School's last sending/receiving relationship.

== Awards, recognition and rankings ==
The school was the 324th-ranked public high school in New Jersey out of 339 schools statewide in New Jersey Monthly magazine's September 2014 cover story on the state's "Top Public High Schools", using a new ranking methodology. The school had also been ranked 324th in the state of 328 schools in 2012, after being ranked 316th in 2010 out of 322 schools listed. The magazine ranked the school in 2008 out of 316 schools. The school was ranked 288th in the magazine's September 2006 issue, which surveyed 316 schools across the state.

== Athletics ==
The Lakewood High School Piners compete in Division B South of the Shore Conference, an athletic conference comprised of public and private high schools in Monmouth and Ocean counties along the Jersey Shore. The league operates under the jurisdiction of the New Jersey State Interscholastic Athletic Association (NJSIAA). With 916 students in grades 10-12, the school was classified by the NJSIAA for the 2019–20 school year as Group III for most athletic competition purposes, which included schools with an enrollment of 761 to 1,058 students in that grade range. The school was classified by the NJSIAA as Group IV South for football for 2024–2026, which included schools with 890 to 1,298 students. The school competes in the C-Central Division of the Shore Conference, in football, tennis, bowling, cheerleading, softball, baseball, wrestling, basketball, volleyball, track, cross country, and field hockey, with the most success over previous years coming in boys' basketball, boys soccer, and girls' and boys' track.

The boys' basketball team won the Group III state championships in 1967 (defeating West New York Memorial High School in the tournament final) and in 1975 (vs. East Orange High School). The team won the Group III title in 1967 with a 74–51 win against Weehawken in the championship game played at Atlantic City Convention Hall, becoming the first Ocean County program to win a state title. The 1975 team finished the season with a record of 28–1 after winning the Group III title in front of 4,000 spectators at Brookdale Community College with a 71–70 championship game victory on two last-second free throws against an East Orange team that came into the game unbeaten in 39 games and having won group titles in each of the three previous seasons. The team won the Central Jersey Group III state sectional title in 2010, defeating Neptune High School in the sectional final by a score of 59–51.

The baseball team won the North I Group III state title in 1967, won the Group III championships in 1973 (vs. Ridgefield Park High School) and 1980 (vs. Newark East Side High School), and won the Group IV title in 1984 (vs. West New York Memorial High School).

The girls' spring track team was the Group III state champion in 1976, 1977, 1979, 1988 and 1989.

The boys' track team won the Group III indoor track championship in 1985 and 1999. The girls team won the Group III title in 1988.

The 1986 football team football team finished the season with an 8–3 record after winning the South Jersey Group III state sectional title by defeating Bridgeton High School by a score of 7–6 in the championship game.

In 1986, the boys' soccer team finished the season with a record of 15-6-1 after a 1–1 tie with Randolph High School made the team the Group III co-champion.

The boys' track team won the Group III spring / outdoor track state championship in 1987. The team won the Group III state indoor relay championship in 1988.

The girls' bowling team won the overall state championship in 1995.

== Administration ==
The school's principal is Richard Goldstein. His core administration team includes four assistant principals and the athletic director.

== Notable alumni ==
- Tyrice Beverette (born 1995; class of 2013), professional Canadian football linebacker for the Hamilton Tiger-Cats of the Canadian Football League
- Matthew Boxer, first New Jersey State Comptroller
- Melvin Cottrell (1929-2002), former mayor of Jackson Township who served in the New Jersey General Assembly from 1992 until his death
- Michael Cudlitz (born 1964), actor who has appeared in Band of Brothers and the TV shows Southland and The Walking Dead
- Marc Eckō (born 1972), founder and CEO of Eckō Unltd.
- Dick Estelle (born 1942), pitcher for the San Francisco Giants in 1964 and 1965
- William Goldstein (born 1942), composer, recording artist, arts philosopher and improvisational pianist
- Virginia E. Haines (born 1946; class of 1964), politician who serves on the Ocean County Board of County Commissioners and had served in the New Jersey General Assembly from 1992 to 1994 and as Executive Director of the New Jersey Lottery from 1994 to 2002
- C.S. Eliot Kang (born 1962), diplomat and member of the Senior Executive Service
- Rich Medina (born 1969; class of 1988), DJ, producer, spoken word poet, archivist, and journalist
- Purnell Mincy (1916–2003; class of 1937), Negro league baseball pitcher from 1938 to 1940
- Chapelle Russell (born 1997; class of 2015), football player
- Rubby Sherr (1913-2013), Princeton University physicist who participated in Manhattan Project at Los Alamos, New Mexico
- Sarri Singer, activist who founded and directs Strength to Strength, an organization that supports survivors of terrorist attacks
- Chris Smith (born 1987; transferred), basketball player for Hapoel Galil Elyon of the Israeli Liga Leumit
- J. R. Smith (born 1985; transferred), National Basketball Association player
