= Jay Alders =

American painter

- Born: Lakewood, New Jersey, U.S.
- Known for: Painting, photography, graphic design
- Website: www.jayalders.com

Jay Alders is an American fine artist, (home) photographer and graphic designer. He is best known for his original surf art paintings, live painting and is a well-known profile in surf culture for his work with musicians, artists and cause organizations.

== Early life ==
Born in Lakewood Township, New Jersey, Alders was raised near the Jersey Shore in Howell Township, New Jersey. This environment provided an early-childhood influence for beach culture. Alders openly attributes surfing as one of his artistic inspirations. He graduated from Howell High School in 1991.

Alders attended Montclair State University and earned a bachelor's degree in art in 1996. At Montclair State University Alders was a member and co-founder of the Gamma Mu chapter of Theta Xi fraternity and illustrator for the Montclarion college newspaper.

== Career and cultural impact ==
Although Alders drew and painted since childhood, it was not until his mid-20s that he started displaying his work at regional art shows.

In November 2007, Alders toured Brazil with musicians Donavon Frankenreiter, G Love, and Matt Costa as part of the Billabong-sponsored Mostra Festival AlmaSurf. The tour also included surf artists Celine Chat, Sean Davey, and other prominent personalities in the surf-entertainment industry. The tour helped push Alders' work into the global market, landing his artwork in art galleries, on skateboards and surfboards and television, including Fuel TV.

In 2008, dietary supplement company Emergen-C used Alders' artwork for a new packaging design, with a portion of the proceeds donated to the Surfrider Foundation.

In February 2009, Alders designed musician and pro surfer Donavon Frankenreiter's Limited Edition Tour Poster. This modified version of Alders' painting, Rio Jam, was released during Frankenreiter's winter/spring 2009 West Coast tour. Alders contributions to Frankenreiter also included the artwork on his custom acoustic guitar and a flip book animation for Frankenreiter's guest edition of Surfer Magazine, published November, 2008.

Alders' artwork was used as a surfboard design for the first time in early 2009. His art piece Left Behind the Wall was shaped and distributed by 9Fish Surfboards.

New Jersey–based reggae band Echo Movement used Alders' painting Burning Inspiration as the cover artwork for their 2009 release, In The Ocean.

Australian based Peter Dixon Band featured the Alders painting Home Slice as the album art for their 2011 release Long Way Home.

Reggae band Echo Movement featured Alders' painting Star Crossed on their 2012 release Love and The Human Outreach.

Acoustic musician Gabe Gomez released his album "In My Island" in 2012 which features Alders' painting Sea Zen of Tranquility. In 2012, Bermuda born reggae musician Mishka featured Alders' painting Out of the Blue on his album Ocean Is My Potion.

On August 24, 2013, Alders hosted a solo art show at Manasquan's historic Algonquin Theatre featuring much of Alders' original surf art as well as his other genres of work. Following the art show, Alders shared the stage with blues music icon G Love; Alders painted during G Love's solo performance.

In 2014, Alders linked up with friend Stefan Lessard, bassist of the Dave Matthews Band, to illustrate a setlist from the band's June 14, 2014 show in Camden, New Jersey by request of Lessard.

In 2016, Alders was commissioned by Slightly Stoopid to create four art tour posters for their international music tours. In 2016, Santa Cruz, California–based musicians The Expendables commissioned Alders for a T-shirt design. The Expendables also performed several live shows while Alders did live painting in Philadelphia and Asbury Park, New Jersey.

In October 2016, Alders collaborated with Rock Climbing World Champion Sasha DiGiulian to create a painting inspired by her.

In July 2017, Alders released a limited edition tour poster for the band 311 and their Asbury Park, New Jersey, show at The Stone Pony.

In July 2018, the band Slightly Stoopid released their new album "Everyday Life, Everyday People" which features an original Jay Alders surf art painting on the Album cover which is inspired by the band's hometown surf break Sunset Cliffs, San Diego.

On October 10, 2018, Jay Alders and his wife Chelsea Alders, launched a podcast, The Shifting Perceptions Podcast:Inspiration for a Creative Lifestyle.

== Charity work ==
In 2009 Alders was named an official SurfAid International Ambassador for his dedicated philanthropic work for the organization.

After Hurricane Sandy hit the Jersey Shore in October 2012, Alders took to action to help his home state. He was featured on Actions News Jax to cover his philanthropic support efforts. Alders helped organize donation drop off points and helped fill trucks with donations.

In November 2012, Alders designed a charity hoodie and t-shirt design which he sold on his website with 100% of the profits going towards Rebuild Recover, a local grass roots Hurricane Sandy non-profit to benefit Hurricane Sandy relief efforts. As of mid-2013, over $15,000 in support was donated from this campaign.

In May 2016, Alders was named one of the 2016 Honorees for Hometown Heroes for his dedicated work raising money and awareness for the organization.

== Personal life ==
Alders has lived at the Jersey Shore, first in Belmar and then in Brick Township, together with his wife Chelsea Alders and his three children: Summer, Greyson and Judah.

== Awards and honors ==
Alders was named a 2016 honoree by the organization Hometown Heroes.
