= Revisited =

Revisited may refer to:

- Revisited (Peter Gabriel album), 1992
- Revisited (Cowboys International album), 2003
- Revisited (Ralph McTell album)
- Revisited (Tom Lehrer album), 1960
- Revisited (Donavon Frankenreiter album), 2010
- Revisited (Eartha Kitt album), 1960
