= Pass It Around (Donavon Frankenreiter album) =

Studio album by Donavon Frankenreiter
- Released: August 19, 2008
- Recorded: 2008
- Genre: Rock
- Length: 37:11
- Label: Lost Highway
- Producer: Joe Chiccarelli

Donavon Frankenreiter chronology
Recycled Recipes (2007)	Pass It Around (2008)	Glow (2010)

Professional ratings
Review scores
Source	Rating
Allmusic	3.5/5 stars
World of Music	3/5 stars

Pass It Around is the title of Donavon Frankenreiter's third album, released on August 19, 2008 (see 2008 in music).

== Track listing ==
1. "Life, Love & Laughter" – 3:12 (Donavon Frankenreiter; Squeak E. Clean)
2. "Too Much Water" – 3:32 (Donavon Frankenreiter; Lehning; Tashian)
3. "Come with Me" – 3:29 (Cockrell; Donavon Frankenreiter)
4. "Your Heart" – 2:46 (Cockrell; Donavon Frankenreiter)
5. "Hit the Ground Running" – 3:40 (Donavon Frankenreiter; McQuien)
6. "Mansions on the Sand" – 5:03 (Donavon Frankenreiter; McQuien)
7. "Someone's Something" – 3:38 (Daly; Donavon Frankenreiter)
8. "Sing a Song" – 3:52 (Donavon Frankenreiter)
9. "Pass It Around" – 4:53 (Donavon Frankenreiter)
10. "Come Together" – 3:06 (Donavon Frankenreiter; Fox; Frazier)

Australian Special Edition Bonus Track
"Can't Go On Without You" - 4:04 (Donavon Frankenreiter)

Brazilian/European Edition Bonus Track
"Everything to Me" - 3:57 (Donavon Frankenreiter)

Japanese Edition has both bonus tracks

== Personnel ==
- Joe Chiccarelli – Producer, Mix Engineer
- Squeak E. Clean – Composer, Producer
- Graham Hope – Recording Engineer
- Bob Ludwig – Mastering
- Bill Mimms – Assistant Engineer
- Donavon Frankenreiter – Guitar, Vocals
- Ben Harper – Guitar, Vocals
- G. Love – Harmonica
- Thad Cockrell – Vocals (Background)
- Matt Cusson – Vocals (Background)
- Grant Lee Phillips – Guitar, Vocals (Background)
- Bruce Kaphan – Guitars
- Arnold McCuller – Vocals (Background)
- Daniel Tashian – Vocals (Background)
- Tim Pierce – Guitars
- John Wicks - Drums
- Craig Barnette – Drums
- Victor Indrizzo – Drums
- Matt Grundy – Bass, Vocals (Background)
- Eric Brigmond – Keyboards, Horns
- Luis Conte – Percussion
- Z. Jimmy – Wind Instruments

== Charts ==
Chart (2008)	Peak position
Australian (ARIA Charts)	16
