= The Invisible Wall =

The Invisible Wall may refer to:

- The Invisible Wall (1944 film), a Swedish drama film directed by Gustaf Molander
- The Invisible Wall (1947 film), an American noir film directed by Eugene Forde
- The Invisible Wall (1991 film), an Italian drama film directed by Marco Risi
- The Invisible Wall (memoir), a 2007 memoir by American author Harry Bernstein
- "The Invisible Wall", a song by Japanese band The Gazette

== See also ==
- Invisible wall
