= Surf art =

Type of visual art

Surf art is visual art about or related to the sport of surfing, waves, and the culture that surrounds beaches.

There is a strong connection between art and surf culture, which reaches back 3,000 years to Peru, where some of the world's first historians carved bas-reliefs of surfers. The intersection of surf and art realms today, however, extends far beyond art documenting life. Both have stretched to encompass each other and the areas of popular culture and commercialism. Art today incorporates graffiti, advertisements and everyday items, and surfing is as much about clothes, attitude and punk music as it is hitting the waves.

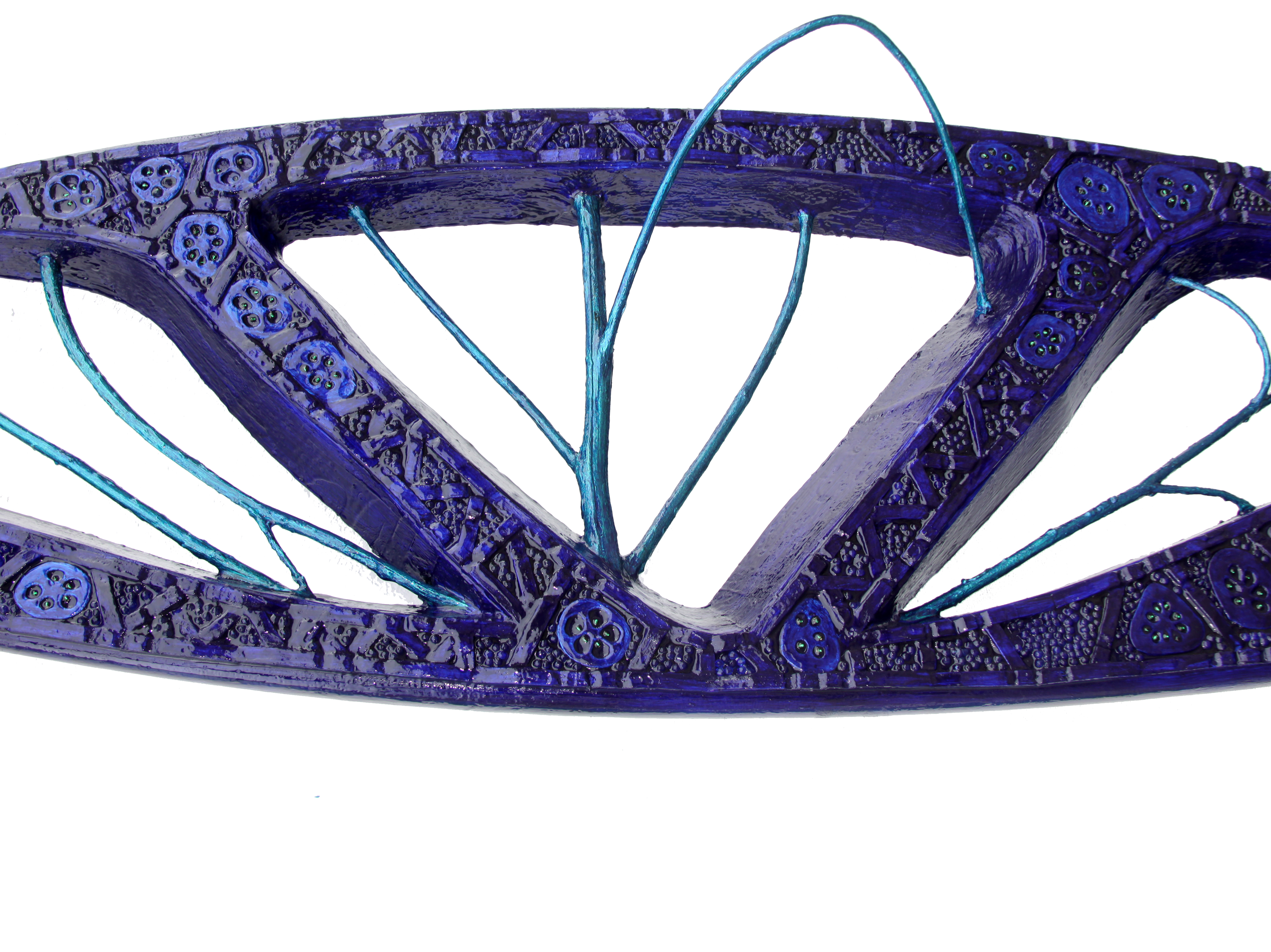
Amanari a reincarnated surfboard sculpture by artist Ithaka Darin Pappas from the series Jurema 2009

Photography is a popular and influential medium of surf art. Imagery documents life, and in surfing terms, it encapsulates a passion, a sport, and a lifestyle. The main objective of surf photography is to not only enlighten the viewer of the pleasures of surfing, but also to demonstrate other facets of the life of a surfer.

While many artists within the field of 'surf art' do not attach themselves to the specific moniker as creators of only surf related art. Other terms often used are 'ocean art', 'wave art', and 'art of the sea' among others.

Variations of surf art as a subject matter can fall within other art styles such as impressionism, surrealism, abstract or realism.

Among coastal communities around the world, surf art in any form is growing in popularity and price. In 2011, contemporary artist Raymond Pettibon's work 'No Title (But the sand)' sold at Christie's for US$820,000.

Surf art has manifested as cave drawings by old native Hawaiians along with painters, surrealists, graphic designers, sculptures and installation artists. Many are surfers themselves. Surf art has spread from coastal areas to urban cities, such as New York, where surf culture and art exhibitions can now be found.

Notable surf artists include Rick Griffin, Raymond Pettibon, Alex Lanau,Leroy Grannis, John Van Hamersveld, Kevin A Short, Drew Brophy, Ithaka Darin Pappas, Sean Davey, Zak Noyle, Jay Alders, and Aaron Chang.

== Surf Graphics ==
The term “Surf Graphics” is used to describe the style of artwork associated with the subculture of surfing when applied to posters, flyers, T-shirts and logos. It is heavily influenced by skate art, Kustom Kulture and tiki culture.

== Around the world ==
=== Australia ===
Surf art is popular in Australian culture, with fashion brands like Mambo and artists like Reg Mombassa playing key roles in popularising the genre. In South Australia, the annual Onkaparinga Surf Art Exhibition shows for two months during Port Noarlunga's peak tourist season, and offers contributing artists a prize pool of AUD$2500 and the opportunity to sell their work.

=== Brazil ===
In Brazil, an artist and curator named Fernando Bari, who created in 2004 a unique website gathering surf artists around the world, have been searching for Brazilian artist who represents the beach culture. The meaning of the community is to share knowledge, mediums and spread the surf art in Brazil. The site also keeps and promotes art exhibitions, uniting artists and keep the community alive.

== See also ==
- Seascape
