= Wallingford Public Access Association =

A Non-profit mass media where the general public can create content

Wallingford Public Access TV Station
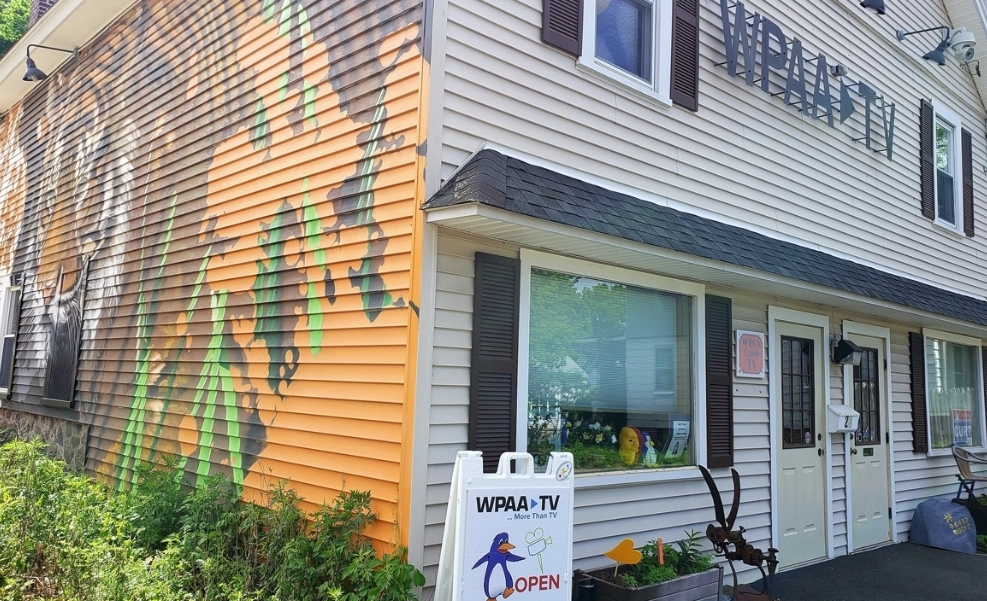
- WPAA-TV building main entrance
- Name: Wallingford Public Access Association Television
- Acronym: WPAA-TV
- Location: 28 So. Orchard St. Wallingford, Connecticut
- Website: https://wpaa.tv/

Wallingford Public Access Association, Inc. (WPAA-TV and Community Media Center) is a nonprofit art and culture community center which manages the town of Wallingford, Connecticut community access TV resources. It is dedicated to providing a brave, safe, and creative space for a diversity of expression from within the community and beyond. It is home to the Nelson 'Carty' Memorial Art Gallery which features #socialactionart.

Volunteer-run, it is funded in part by Cable TV subscriber fees as well as traditional nonprofit income sources such as grants, grassroots donations, and in-kind services and furnishings. WPAA-TV cablecasts to Wallingford on Comcast Channel 1070.

Use of the tools and stage for collaborative media creation in the public interest is available to all eligible users. Included are media production tools, a modern TV Studio, and technical assistance. Training includes TV Production (Lights, camera, action), information literacy and storytelling. The nonprofit support the creation of local content from the users point-of-view. The organization also convenes ACTORvists, Poets, Musicians and Artist in the exploration of democracy as a creative practice. Several programs about Associated Press Founder and Wallingford native, Moses Yale Beach, are in production as the Moses Yale Beach, Revealed project.

Connecticut utility regulators designated the station the Community Access Provider (CAP) for Wallingford. Unlike other public access stations, WPAA distributes government and educational access television, including news from Connecticut congresspeople and content made by state and federal government sources.

This Community TV station is located in a two-story 1924 cow barn renovated by volunteers at 28 South Orchard Street in downtown Wallingford. The old hayloft now called studioW is where their ‘Make TV’ program happens. A mural by Ryan “ARCY” Christenson covers the full north side of the building which is now owned by WPAA-TV.

WPAA-TV is known for being where internet celebrity Michael Buckley got his start, producing the earliest version of his show What the Buck. Another notable media celebrity is former station manager, now Emmy Award-winning editor of National Geographic Life Below Zero Eric Michael Schrader. While at WPAA-TV he worked on the film It Happened But Nobody Noticed about CT Punk Rock Scene 1970–80.

As a destination, WPAA-TV welcomes people to visit the art gallery, reserve community rooms for civic engagement or technical tools to create video or podcast in the public interest. The nonprofit also hosts local theater and filmmaking initiatives. Film initiatives include the award-winning fantasy episodic series The Sparrow Falling and children's animated program like Space Bears The Movie and Space Bears, producer Michael Schleif. Several interns from CT colleges are now in the news & entertainment industry. The gallery permanent collection StreetshotZ, features photographs by local portrait photographer Charles Buzinsky.

Proceeds from gallery events supports local food and housing insecure programs in the area. WPAA-TV welcomed visitors to bring nonperishable food when they visit the gallery. As part of a StreetshotZ Photobook give-a-way volunteers panhandle for donations. This project and promotion video was recognized as first place Community Impact winner by the national Alliance for Community Media in 2020.

WPAA-TV is also noted for Alliance for Community Media Best in the USA small stations awards of 2019, 2021,22, 23, 25 and two consecutive years, best in New England 2013 and 2014, awarded by Alliance for Community Media North East. More recently, WPAA-TV was a finalist Excellence Nor’easter Festival 2021, 2022 and recipient of Community Impact 2021,22,23 Some of the station's producers including Georgian Lussier have won some prestigious honors such as Rika Welsh Community Impact Award. The volunteer executive director, Susan Huizenga, was recognized as a contributor to the community media movement in 2023 by ACM-NE with the Church Sherwood Leadership Award.

WPAA-TV's youth program, TeenTigerTV, also has standout accomplishments. . Among them Ben Negron, was the 2022 Democracy Youth Challenge Social Media winner in Civic Life Project When I Speak Freely. This video is featured in the inaugural WNET Youth Collective Film Festival The program received the 2025 Rika Welsh Community Impact Award (ACM-NE).
