= Brick Township, New Jersey =

Township in Ocean County, New Jersey, US

- Township
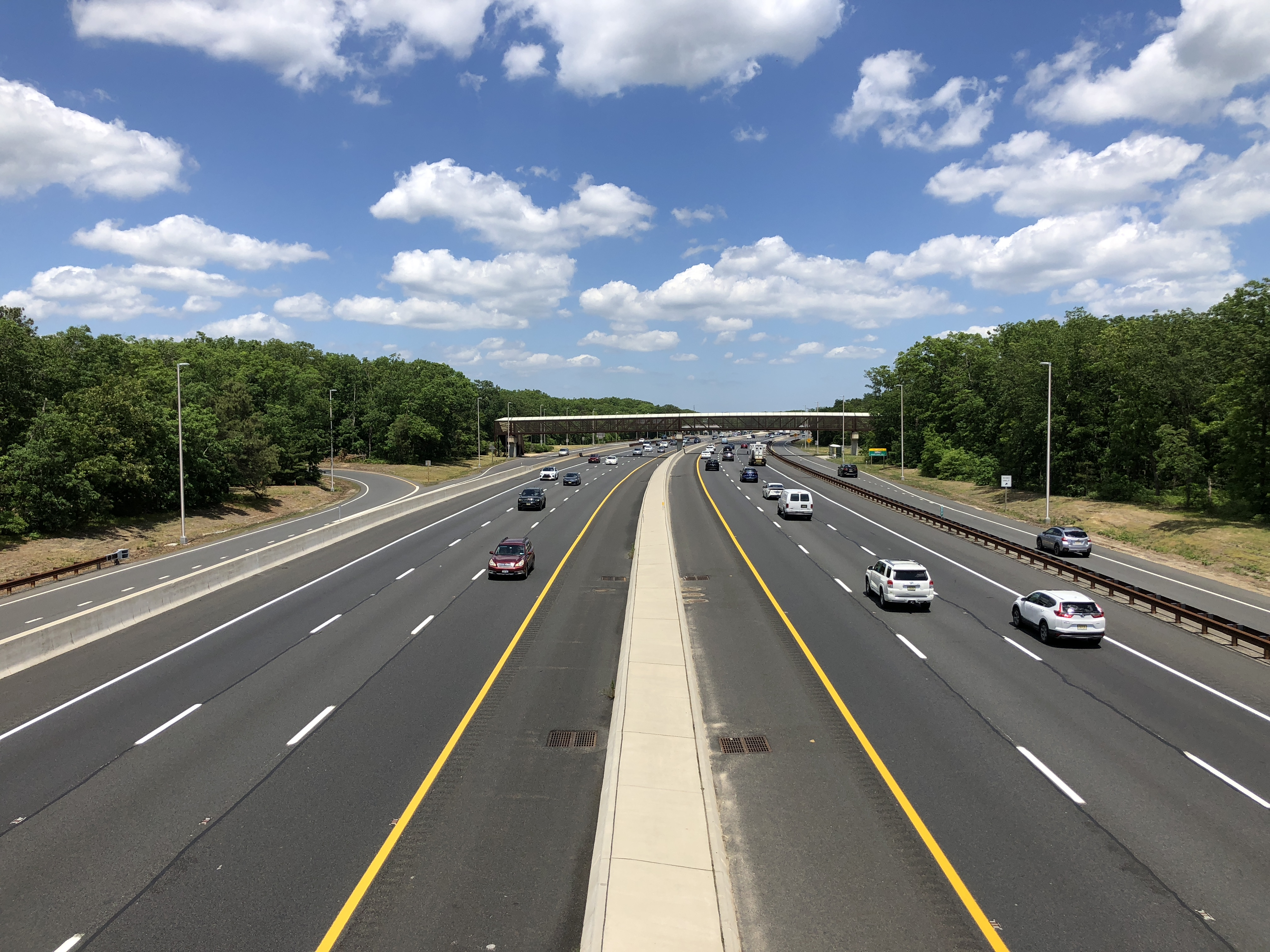
- Southward view of the Garden State Parkway in Brick Township

- Seal
- Nickname: Bricktown USA
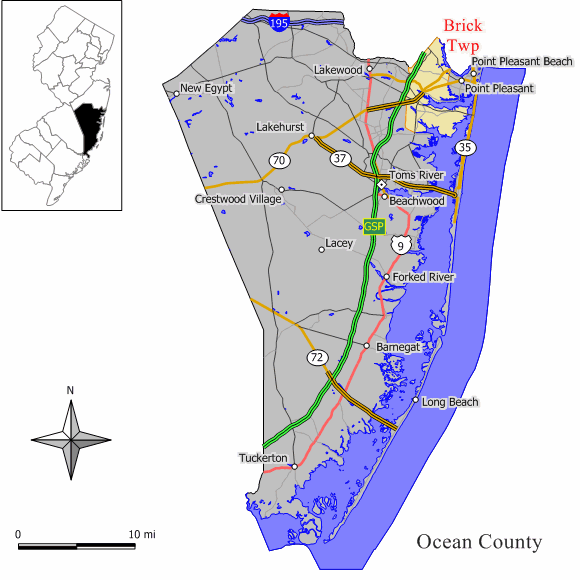
- Location of Brick Township in Ocean County highlighted in yellow (right). Inset map: Location of Ocean County in New Jersey highlighted in black (left).

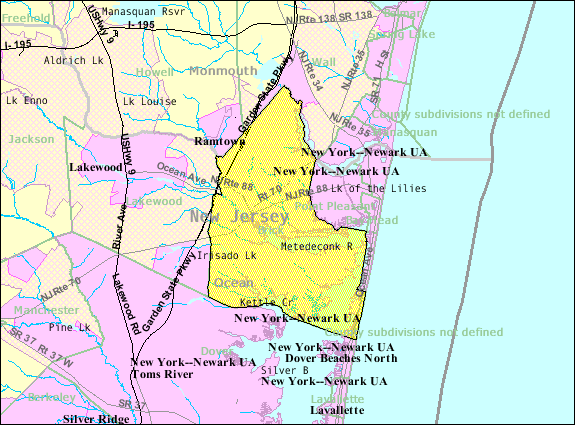
- Census Bureau map of Brick Township, New Jersey
- Interactive map of Brick Township, New Jersey
- Location in Ocean County Location in New Jersey Location in the United States
- Coordinates: 40.061736°N 74.10962°W
- Country: United States
- State: New Jersey
- County: Ocean
- Incorporated: February 15, 1850
- Named for: Joseph W. Brick

Government
  - Type: Faulkner Act (mayor–council)
  - Body: Township Council
  - Mayor: Lisa Crate (D, term ends December 31, 2029)
  - Administrator: Joanne Bergin
  - Municipal clerk: Lynnette A. Iannarone

Area
  - Total: 32.22 sq mi (83.44 km^{2})
  - Land: 25.61 sq mi (66.34 km^{2})
  - Water: 6.61 sq mi (17.11 km^{2}) 20.50%
  - Rank: 77th of 565 in state 11th of 33 in county
- Elevation: 16 ft (4.9 m)

Population (2020)
  - Total: 73,620
  - Estimate (2025): 77,402 ▲
  - Rank: 13th of 565 in state 3rd of 33 in county
  - Density: 3,022/sq mi (1,167/km^{2})
  - Rank: 225th of 565 in state 10th of 33 in county
- Time zone: UTC−05:00 (Eastern (EST))
  - Summer (DST): UTC−04:00 (Eastern (EDT))
- ZIP Codes: 08723–08724
- Area code: 732
- FIPS code: 3402907420
- GNIS feature ID: 0882075
- Website: www.bricknj.gov

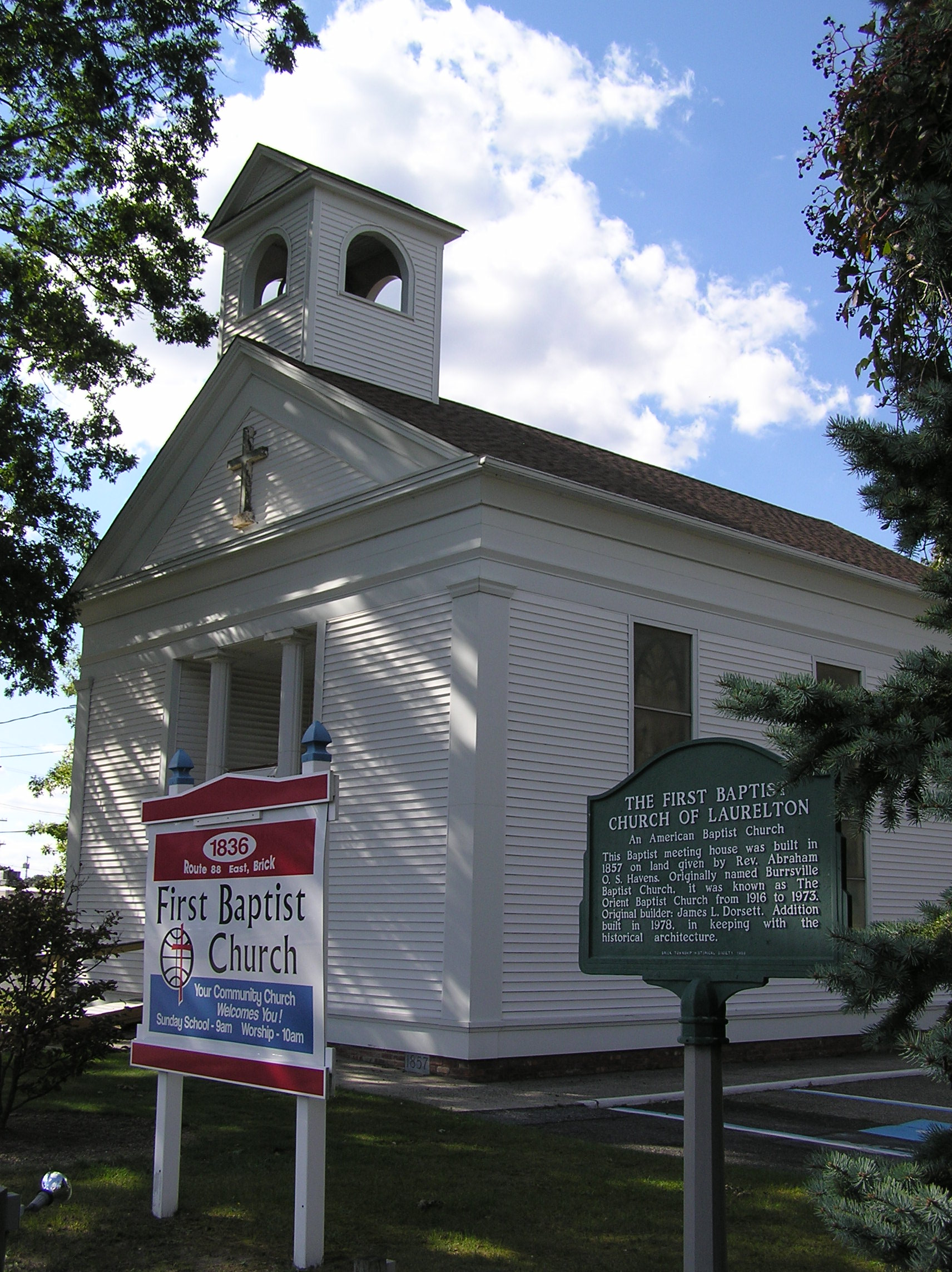
The historic First Baptist Church of Laurelton in Brick Township, located on Route 88

Brick Township is a township situated on the Jersey Shore within Ocean County, in the U.S. state of New Jersey. As of the 2020 United States census, the city retained its position as the state's 13th-most-populous municipality, with a population of 73,620, a decrease of 1,452 (−1.9%) from the 2010 census count of 75,072, which in turn reflected a decline of 1,047 residents (−1.4%) from its population of 76,119 at the 2000 census, when it was the state's 12th most-populous municipality.

A majority of Brick Township is located on the mainland. There are Brick Ocean Beaches I, II, and III situated on the Barnegat Peninsula, a long, narrow barrier peninsula that separates Barnegat Bay from the Atlantic Ocean. The mainland and beach area of the town are not geographically adjacent. Brick Township was incorporated as a township by an act of the New Jersey Legislature on February 15, 1850, from portions of both Dover Township (now Toms River Township) and Howell Township. The township was named after Joseph Brick, the owner of Bergen Iron Works located on the Metedeconk River. Portions of the township were taken to form Point Pleasant Beach (May 18, 1886), Bay Head (June 15, 1886), Lakewood Township (March 23, 1892), Mantoloking (April 10, 1911) and Point Pleasant (April 21, 1920). In 1963, voters rejected a referendum that would have changed the township's name to "Laurelton".

After hovering for years in the top five, in 2006, the township earned the title of "America's Safest City", out of 371 cities included nationwide in the 13th annual Morgan Quitno survey. Since the year 2000, Brick Township has been the safest "city" (population over 75,000) in New Jersey. In 2003 and 2004, Brick Township was ranked as the second safest city in the United States, after Newton, Massachusetts. In 2005, Brick Township had dropped down to the fifth safest "city" (population over 75,000) in the United States, before it rebounded to the top in 2006.

== History ==
The area that would become Brick Township began as a rural community. In 1833, Joseph W. Brick established the Bergen Iron Works. Brick died in 1847, shortly before the township’s creation.

In 1850, the New Jersey State Legislature created Ocean County from portions of Monmouth and Burlington counties. At the same time, Brick Township was formed from parts of Howell and Dover townships. The new township was named for Joseph W. Brick, the owner of Bergen Iron Works and one of the area’s most prominent citizens at the time of its incorporation.

The Havens Homestead Museum preserves the history of the Havens family, who originally settled in the Laurelton/Burrsville section of Brick. The museum is housed in the original Havens family home, located on a small plot of farmland. It includes a gift shop and offers daily tours of the property.

In August of 1869, President Ulysses S. Grant visited Brick.

In 1954, the Garden State Parkway opened, connecting Brick Township to North Jersey. The improved access contributed to a housing boom from the 1950s through the 1980s, during which many of Brick’s modern neighborhoods were developed, including Lake Riviera, Laurelton, and Baywood. The riots in the urban areas back in the 1960s and 70s also contributed to Brick’s growth as well because families that were fleeing the riots have come to the town as an ideal place to relocate. As more people moved to the town, the general stores were replaced by department stores, supermarkets, and speciality shops.

Brick Township High School opened in 1958.

In 1966, Bruce Springsteen recorded 2 songs at Mr. Music Studio in Brick.

Brick Township has also been in the news for a claimed autism epidemic, in which 40 children out of over 6,000 surveyed were found to be autistic, though Brick's autism rate is statistically near the national average. Many of the children found to be autistic were born in Northern New Jersey and other parts of the country. There is no evidence that the levels of autism are linked to any specific environmental factor in Brick. Parents of children diagnosed with autism have moved to the township in order to make use of the special education programs offered by the school district.

Brick has been affected by the heroin epidemic. According to the state's statistics, in 2012 Brick was ranked sixth in the state with 550 reported incidents of heroin or opiate abuse, behind Newark, Jersey City, Paterson, Atlantic City and Camden. In 2017, Brick improved to 438 reported heroin abuse cases, ranked ninth in the state.

On July 11, 2004, Brick Memorial High School student Brittney Gregory went missing, and her disappearance received national media attention. Her body was later found in a shallow grave after a woman led police to the area. Jack Fuller Jr., a drug addict and acquaintance of Gregory’s father, admitted to killing her. Fuller stated that he had been giving Gregory a ride to her boyfriend’s house when he began smoking crack cocaine in the car. According to Fuller, Gregory became upset, and he punched her several times. After she died, he buried her body.

During the December 2010 North American blizzard, Brick Township received 30 inches (760 mm) of snow, the highest accumulation recorded in the state. In October 2012, parts of Brick were devastated by Hurricane Sandy. Barrier island and other waterfront properties were particularly hard hit. Homes and such buildings as the Shore Acres Yacht Club sustained major damage; some buildings had to be demolished.

During the February 2026 North American blizzard, Brick Township received 24–30 inches (610–760 mm) of snow, multiple areas of Brick was without power for up to 15 hours, there was a state-wide travel ban from February 23-24, only emergency vehicles could travel on roadways.

== Geography ==
According to the U.S. Census Bureau, the township had a total area of 32.22 square miles (83.44 km^{2}), including 25.61 square miles (66.34 km^{2}) of land and 6.61 square miles (17.11 km^{2}) of water (20.50%).

Unincorporated communities, localities and place names located partially or completely within the township include Adamston, Arrowhead Village, Breton Woods, Burrsville, Cedar Bridge, CedarCroft, Cedarwood Park, Cherry Quay, Greenbriar, Havens Cove, Havens Point, Herbertsville, Herring Island, Lanes Mills, Laurelton, Mandalay Park, Metedeconk, Metedeconk Neck, Osbornville, Playground Beach, Riviera Beach, Seaweed Point, Shore Acres, Sloop Point, Swan Point, Wardell's Neck, West Mantoloking and West Osbornville.

The communities of Herbertsville and Parkway Pines are located close to exit 91 of the Garden State Parkway, near the Monmouth County border, and are geographically distant from the rest of the township. Bayberry Court and Maypink Lane are two streets that are not accessible from any other Brick roads, and are served by the United States Postal Service as ZIP Code 07731 with Howell Township.

The township borders Bay Head, Lakewood Township, Mantoloking, Point Pleasant and Toms River Township in Ocean County; and the Monmouth County municipalities of Brielle, Howell Township and Wall Township.

== Demographics ==
Historical population
Census	Pop.	Note	%±
1850	1,558		—
1860	1,835		17.8%
1870	2,724		48.4%
1880	2,990		9.8%
1890	4,065	*	36.0%
1900	2,130	*	−47.6%
1910	2,177		2.2%
1920	2,084	*	−4.3%
1930	1,172	*	−43.8%
1940	1,376		17.4%
1950	4,319		213.9%
1960	16,299		277.4%
1970	35,057		115.1%
1980	53,629		53.0%
1990	66,473		23.9%
2000	76,119		14.5%
2010	75,072		−1.4%
2020	73,620		−1.9%
2025 (est.)	77,402		5.1%
Population sources: 1850–2000; 1850–1920 1850–1870; 1850 1870 1880–1890; 1890–1910 1910–1930; 1940–2000 2000; 2010 2020 * = Lost territory in previous decade.

=== 2010 census ===
The 2010 United States census counted 75,072 people, 29,842 households, and 20,173 families in the township. The population density was 2,919.4 per square mile (1,127.2/km^{2}). There were 33,677 housing units at an average density of 1,309.6 per square mile (505.6/km^{2}). The racial makeup was 93.05% (69,856) White, 2.00% (1,502) Black or African American, 0.14% (104) Native American, 1.56% (1,173) Asian, 0.04% (27) Pacific Islander, 1.80% (1,350) from other races, and 1.41% (1,060) from two or more races. Hispanic or Latino of any race were 7.06% (5,301) of the population.

Of the 29,842 households, 27.3% had children under the age of 18; 52.6% were married couples living together; 10.9% had a female householder with no husband present and 32.4% were non-families. Of all households, 27.2% were made up of individuals and 13.7% had someone living alone who was 65 years of age or older. The average household size was 2.49 and the average family size was 3.05.

20.7% of the population were under the age of 18, 7.6% from 18 to 24, 23.8% from 25 to 44, 29.9% from 45 to 64, and 17.9% who were 65 years of age or older. The median age was 43.6 years. For every 100 females, the population had 91.0 males. For every 100 females ages 18 and older there were 87.6 males.

The Census Bureau's 2006-2010 American Community Survey showed that (in 2010 inflation-adjusted dollars) median household income was $65,129 (with a margin of error of +/− $2,969) and the median family income was $81,868 (+/− $2,081). Males had a median income of $60,769 (+/− $1,755) versus $41,361 (+/− $1,655) for females. The per capita income for the township was $33,258 (+/− $891). About 4.1% of families and 5.2% of the population were below the poverty line, including 8.1% of those under age 18 and 5.9% of those age 65 or over.

=== 2000 census ===
As of the 2000 U.S. census, there were 76,119 people, 29,511 households, and 20,775 families residing in the township. The population density was 2,901.5 inhabitants per square mile (1,120.3/km^{2}). There were 32,689 housing units at an average density of 1,246.0 per square mile (481.1/km^{2}). The racial makeup of the township was 95.81% White, 0.99% African American, 0.10% Native American, 1.19% Asian, 0.02% Pacific Islander, 0.85% from other races, and 1.04% from two or more races. Hispanic or Latino of any nationality were 3.85% of the population.

There were 29,511 households, out of which 31.6% had children under the age of 18 living with them, 56.8% were married couples living together, 10.2% had a female householder with no husband present, and 29.6% were non-families. Of all households, 25.0% were made up of individuals, and 12.7% had someone living alone who was 65 years of age or older. The average household size was 2.56 and the average family size was 3.07.

In the township, the population was spread out, with 23.8% under the age of 18, 6.4% from 18 to 24, 29.5% from 25 to 44, 23.3% from 45 to 64, and 17.0% who were 65 years of age or older. The median age was 39 years. For every 100 females, there were 90.5 males. For every 100 females age 18 and over, there were 86.8 males.

The median income for a household in the township was $52,092, and the median income for a family was $61,446. Males had a median income of $44,981 versus $31,020 for females. The per capita income for the township was $24,462. About 3.1% of families and 4.5% of the population were below the poverty line, including 5.8% of those under age 18 and 5.0% of those age 65 or over.

== Sports ==
The Brick Pop Warner Little Scholars Mustangs finished the 2006 season with a perfect 9–0 record and won the Jersey Shore B Division.

In 2003, and from 2006 to 2009, the Pop Warner Brick Mustang cheerleaders competed against other teams from across the nation in Disney World. In 2003, the junior peewee Mustang cheer squad won the national title.

Brick is home of the Ocean Ice Palace, built in 1960, which hosts the Brick Hockey Club. The ice rink is also home to the Brick Stars, a special needs hockey team who has home games and practices.

== Parks and recreation ==
Brick Township Reservoir, with parts located in both Brick and Wall Township, covers 80 acres (32 ha) and is encircled by a 1.7-mile (2.7 km) trail. Fishing is permitted on the reservoir. The reservoir can hold up to 1,000,000,000 US gallons (3.8×10^{9} L; 830,000,000 imp gal) of water, which is pumped in from the Metedeconk River. The township also maintains nearly a dozen community parks, a multi-sports facility at the Drum Point Sports Complex and three oceanfront beaches as well as Windward Beach Park on the Metedeconk River.

== Government ==
=== Local government ===
The township operates within the Faulkner Act (formally known as the Optional Municipal Charter Law) under the Mayor-Council plan 2 form of government, as implemented on January 1, 1990, based on direct petition. The township is one of 71 municipalities (of the 564) statewide that use this form of government. The governing body is composed of the Mayor and the seven-member Township Council, whose members are elected to serve four-year terms of office, with either three seats (and the mayoral seat) or four seats up for election at-large in partisan elections held on a staggered basis in odd-numbered years as part of the November general election. The mayor is elected for a four-year term without limitation as to the number of terms. In November 1988, the voters approved a referendum which returned the township to the partisan system of government, with township elections held as part of the November general election (rather than in May).

The mayor is the township's chief executive and administrative officer and is responsible for administering local laws and policy development. The mayor makes various appointments, prepares the township's budget, and approves or vetoes ordinances adopted by the Township Council (which may be overridden by a two-thirds vote of the Township Council). The mayor appoints, with the advice and consent of the Township Council, the business administrator, the township attorney, and the directors of the Departments of Public Safety, Engineering and Public Works.

As of 2026, the mayor of Brick Township is Democrat Lisa Crate, who was appointed to serve a term of office ending on December 31, 2029. Members of the Township Council are Council President Steve Feinman (D, 2027), Council Vice President Derrick T. Ambrosino (D, 2027), Perry Albanese (R, 2029), Greg Cohen (R, 2029), Vincent Minichino (D, 2027), Lisa Reina (R, 2029) and Melissa Travers (D, 2027).

In February 2023, the township council selected Lisa Crate from a list of three candidates nominated by the Democratic municipal committee to fill the vacant mayoral seat expiring in December 2025, following mayor John G. Ducey's resignation to take a seat as a New Jersey Superior Court Judge; Crate served on an interim basis pending the November 2023 special election where she defeated Assemblyman John Catalano. In turn, the council selected Melissa Travers to fill the vacant council seat expiring in December 2023 that had been held by Crate.

In October 2022, the council appointed Derrick Ambrosino to fill the seat expiring in December 2023 that had been held by Arthur Halloran until his resignation the previous month.

In January 2014, the Township Council appointed Andrea Zapcic to fill the vacant council seat expiring in December 2015 of John G. Ducey after he took office as mayor. Zapcic won election in November 2014 to serve the balance of the term.

Ducey was elected as mayor in 2013, garnering 62% of the vote to defeat Republican opponent Joseph Sangiovanni.

Former Democratic Mayor Joseph C. Scarpelli resigned as of December 8, 2006, amid a federal corruption probe into township government. On January 8, 2007, Scarpelli pleaded guilty to federal bribery charges for accepting money from developers in exchange for using his official position to obtain approval for development projects. Township Clerk Virginia Lampman was appointed to fill the role of mayor until the Township Council could select a replacement. On December 17, 2007, Scarpelli was sentenced in Federal Court in Newark to serve 18 months in prison, and fined $5,000, after admitting that he had accepted bribes from 1998 to 2003.

On January 4, 2007, Daniel J. Kelly (D), the chairman of the township's planning board, was appointed the new mayor by a three-member township council subcommittee. On November 6, 2007, Stephen C. Acropolis defeated Kelly in a race to fill the remaining two years of Scarpelli's term, leading his four Republican mates to wins for seats on the township Council.

=== Federal, state, and county representation ===
Brick Township is located in the 4th Congressional District and is part of New Jersey's 10th state legislative district.

For the 119th United States Congress, New Jersey's 4th congressional district is represented by Chris Smith (R, Manchester Township). New Jersey is represented in the United States Senate by Democrats Cory Booker (Newark, term ends 2027) and Andy Kim (Moorestown, term ends 2031).

For the 2026–2027 session, the 10th legislative district of the New Jersey Legislature is represented in the State Senate by James W. Holzapfel (R, Toms River) and in the General Assembly by Paul Kanitra (R, Point Pleasant Beach) and Gregory P. McGuckin (R, Toms River).

Ocean County is governed by a Board of County Commissioners composed of five members who are elected on an at-large basis in partisan elections and serving staggered three-year terms of office, with either one or two seats coming up for election each year as part of the November general election. At an annual reorganization held in the beginning of January, the board chooses a director and a deputy director from among its members. As of 2025, Ocean County's Commissioners (with party affiliation, term-end year and residence) are:

John P. Kelly (R, 2025, Eagleswood Township), Virginia E. Haines (R, 2025, Toms River), Robert Arace (R, Manchester Township, 2027) Jennifer Bacchione (R, Berkeley Township, 2027) and Frank Sadeghi (R, 2026, Toms River).

Constitutional officers elected on a countywide basis are: Clerk Scott M. Colabella (R, 2025, Barnegat Light), Sheriff Michael G. Mastronardy (R, 2025; Toms River) and Surrogate Jeffrey Moran (R, 2028, Beachwood).

=== Politics ===
As of March 2011, there were a total of 48,760 registered voters in Brick Township, of which 9,992 (20.5%) were registered as Democrats, 12,206 (25.0%) were registered as Republicans and 26,528 (54.4%) were registered as Unaffiliated. There were 34 voters registered to other parties. Among the township's 2010 Census population, 65.0% (vs. 63.2% in Ocean County) were registered to vote, including 81.9% of those ages 18 and over (vs. 82.6% countywide).

Gubernatorial election results for Brick Township
Year	Republican		Democratic		Third party(ies)	
Year	No.	%	No.	%	No.	%
2025	20,963	60.85%	13,335	38.70%	155	0.45%
2021	19,653	68.53%	8,779	30.61%	244	0.85%
2017	13,609	62.18%	7,779	35.54%	500	2.28%
2013	17,331	74.39%	5,633	24.18%	332	1.43%
2009	17,822	68.27%	6,675	25.57%	1,608	6.16%
2005	14,160	55.18%	10,403	40.54%	1,100	4.29%

Brick Township has voted for Republicans virtually in federal and statewide elections. President Donald J. Trump win in landslides in 2016, 2020, and 2024. The President won over 60% of the vote in each election, including by a 63%-35% margin in 2024.

In the 2012 presidential election, Republican Mitt Romney received 55.9% of the vote (18,484 cast), ahead of Democrat Barack Obama with 42.9% (14,184 votes), and other candidates with 1.2% (387 votes), among the 33,328 ballots cast by the township's 51,117 registered voters (273 ballots were spoiled), for a turnout of 65.2%.[117][118] In the 2008 presidential election, Republican John McCain received 58.1% of the vote (21,912 cast), ahead of Democrat Barack Obama with 39.9% (15,031 votes) and other candidates with 1.3% (489 votes), among the 37,704 ballots cast by the township's 50,742 registered voters, for a turnout of 74.3%.[119] In the 2004 presidential election, Republican George W. Bush received 60.9% of the vote (21,888 ballots cast), outpolling Democrat John Kerry with 37.8% (13,596 votes) and other candidates with 0.8% (363 votes), among the 35,954 ballots cast by the township's 48,235 registered voters, for a turnout percentage of 74.5.[120]

Presidential Elections Results
Year	Republican	Democratic	Third Parties
2024	63.4% 27,196	35.0% 14,995	1.6% 608
2020	61.1% 27,699	37.0% 16,772	1.9% 678
2016	65.2% 24,136	31.4% 11,610	3.4% 1,260
2012	55.9% 18,484	42.9% 14,184	1.2% 387
2008	58.1% 21,912	39.9% 15,031	1.3% 489
2004	60.9% 21,888	37.8% 13,596	0.8% 363

In the 2013 gubernatorial election, Republican Chris Christie received 74.4% of the vote (17,331 cast), ahead of Democrat Barbara Buono with 24.2% (5,633 votes), and other candidates with 1.4% (332 votes), among the 23,830 ballots cast by the township's 50,398 registered voters (534 ballots were spoiled), for a turnout of 47.3%. In the 2009 gubernatorial election, Republican Chris Christie received 67.3% of the vote (17,822 ballots cast), ahead of Democrat Jon Corzine with 25.2% (6,675 votes), Independent Chris Daggett with 5.0% (1,336 votes) and other candidates with 1.0% (272 votes), among the 26,479 ballots cast by the township's 49,529 registered voters, yielding a 53.5% turnout.

United States Senate election results for Brick Township1
Year	Republican		Democratic		Third party(ies)	
Year	No.	%	No.	%	No.	%
2024	24,474	60.34%	15,680	38.66%	407	1.00%
2018	18,956	62.93%	10,019	33.26%	1,148	3.81%
2012	17,241	55.45%	13,218	42.51%	634	2.04%
2006	12,151	56.64%	8,609	40.13%	692	3.23%

United States Senate election results for Brick Township2
Year	Republican		Democratic		Third party(ies)	
Year	No.	%	No.	%	No.	%
2020	26,649	60.64%	16,391	37.30%	904	2.06%
2014	10,079	57.80%	6,895	39.54%	465	2.67%
2013	8,380	64.07%	4,566	34.91%	133	1.02%
2008	20,433	58.96%	13,496	38.94%	729	2.10%

== Education ==
The Brick Public Schools serve students in pre-kindergarten through twelfth grade. As of the 2020–21 school year, the district, comprised of 12 schools, had an enrollment of 8,414 students and 689.1 classroom teachers (on an FTE basis), for a student–teacher ratio of 12.2:1. Schools in the district (with 2020–21 enrollment data from the National Center for Education Statistics) are Herbertsville Preschool (147; PreK), Warren H. Wolf Preschool (277; PreK; created for 2014-15 school year from Primary Learning Center), Drum Point Elementary School (479; K-5), Lanes Mill Elementary School (560; K-5), Midstreams Elementary School (548; K-5), Osborneville Elementary School (402; K-5), Veterans Memorial Elementary School (647; K-5), Emma Havens Young Elementary School (732; K-5), Lake Riviera Middle School (861; 6-8), Veterans Memorial Middle School (965; 6-8), Brick Memorial High School (1,410; 9-12) and Brick Township High School (1,314; 9-12).

Nonsectarian private schools include Cuddle Care Early Childhood Center and Ocean Early Childhood Center.

St. Dominic Elementary School is a Roman Catholic private school overseen by the Roman Catholic Diocese of Trenton, and St. Paul's Christian School, a Methodist private school, serve students in nursery through eighth grade.

== Transportation ==
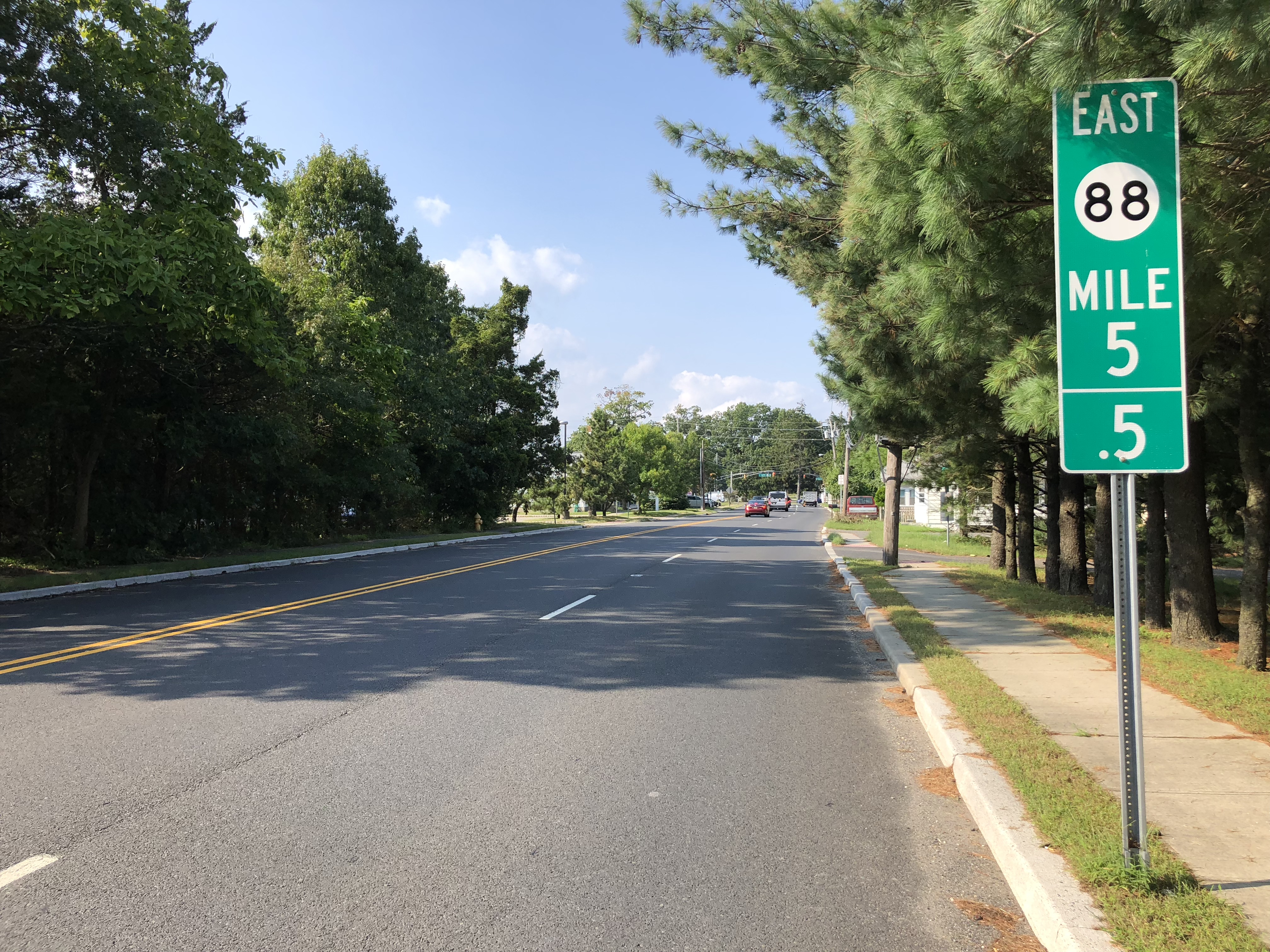
The view eastward along Route 88 in Brick Township

=== Roads and highways ===
As of May 2010, the township had a total of 318.77 miles (513.01 km) of roadways, of which 256.23 miles (412.36 km) were maintained by the municipality, 46.64 miles (75.06 km) by Ocean County and 12.61 miles (20.29 km) by the New Jersey Department of Transportation and 3.29 miles (5.29 km) by the New Jersey Turnpike Authority.

The Garden State Parkway is the most prominent highway passing through Brick. It traverses the western part of the municipality with three interchanges: Exits 89, 90 and 91. Three state routes also pass through: Route 70 Route 88, and Route 35. The major county routes that pass through are County Route 528, and County Route 549 (as well as its spur).

The Laurelton Circle was located near the center of Brick Township. The traffic circle was at the junction of Route 70, Route 88 and Princeton Avenue. With an unmanageable 95,000 vehicles navigating the circle each day, it was converted to a traffic light regulated intersection in 1986, due to an increase in traffic and accidents. To reduce the need for left turns, a short portion of eastbound Route 88 was re-routed onto Princeton Avenue. Some other movements are controlled by jughandles and a two-way connection in the northwest corner.

=== Public transportation ===
NJ Transit offers bus service between the township and the Port Authority Bus Terminal in Midtown Manhattan on the 137 route, to Camden on the 317 and to Newark on the 67. Bus service is available from the Garden State Parkway to the Financial District in Lower Manhattan via the Academy Bus Line. Brick Township Park & Ride is located in the township off of the Garden State Parkway at exit 91. It is an express route to New York City during peak rush-hour. Ocean Ride service is provided on route 3, 3A and 4.

== Media ==
WBGD 91.9FM (Brick Green Dragons) went on the air in 1974, originally located at Brick Township High School. The station was later moved to Brick Memorial High School. The radio station was the brainchild of a teacher named Robert Boesch who taught electronics at Brick Township High School in the 1960s, 1970s and 1980s. The station was a student-run operation and received its FCC license from the FCC for educational broadcasting. In 1981, all township residents could receive the station's signal after the FCC approved an increase in WBGD's authorized power from 10 watts to 150.

One of the most notable broadcasts was the first ever state high school football championship game played between Brick Township High School and Camden High School in December 1974. The Brick Green Dragons defeated Camden by a score of 21–20 on the last play of the game to win the title.

In 2007, during routine roof maintenance and repair work, the broadcast tower was cut off the roof, and was never replaced or repaired. In 2010 WBGD's license was retired.

The Asbury Park Press provides daily news coverage of the township, as does WOBM-FM radio. The government of the township provides material and commentary to The Brick Times, which is one of seven weekly papers from Micromedia Publications.

== Climate ==
According to the Köppen climate classification system, Brick Township has a humid subtropical climate (Cfa). Cfa climates are characterized by all months having an average mean temperature above 32.0 °F (0.0 °C), at least four months with an average mean temperature at or above 50.0 °F (10.0 °C), at least one month with an average mean temperature at or above 71.6 °F (22.0 °C) and no significant precipitation difference between seasons. During the summer months in Brick Township, a cooling afternoon sea breeze is present on most days, but episodes of extreme heat and humidity can occur with heat index values at or above 95.0 °F (35.0 °C). On average, the wettest month of the year is July which corresponds with the annual peak in thunderstorm activity. During the winter months, episodes of extreme cold and wind can occur with wind chill values below 0.0 °F (−17.8 °C). The plant hardiness zone at Brick Township Beach is 7a with an average annual extreme minimum air temperature of 3.4 °F (−15.9 °C). The average seasonal (November–April) snowfall total is between 18 and 24 inches (46 and 61 cm) and the average snowiest month is February which corresponds with the annual peak in nor'easter activity.

Climate data for Brick Twp Beach, NJ (1981–2010 Averages)
Month	Jan	Feb	Mar	Apr	May	Jun	Jul	Aug	Sep	Oct	Nov	Dec	Year
Mean daily maximum °F (°C)	40.2 (4.6)	42.7 (5.9)	49.6 (9.8)	59.1 (15.1)	68.9 (20.5)	78.1 (25.6)	83.3 (28.5)	82.2 (27.9)	76.0 (24.4)	65.5 (18.6)	55.2 (12.9)	45.1 (7.3)	62.3 (16.8)
Daily mean °F (°C)	32.6 (0.3)	34.7 (1.5)	41.2 (5.1)	50.4 (10.2)	60.1 (15.6)	69.6 (20.9)	75.0 (23.9)	74.0 (23.3)	67.4 (19.7)	56.2 (13.4)	47.0 (8.3)	37.4 (3.0)	53.9 (12.2)
Mean daily minimum °F (°C)	25.1 (−3.8)	26.7 (−2.9)	32.8 (0.4)	41.6 (5.3)	51.3 (10.7)	61.0 (16.1)	66.7 (19.3)	65.8 (18.8)	58.7 (14.8)	47.0 (8.3)	38.8 (3.8)	29.6 (−1.3)	45.5 (7.5)
Average precipitation inches (mm)	3.66 (93)	3.07 (78)	4.22 (107)	3.94 (100)	3.53 (90)	3.68 (93)	4.61 (117)	4.47 (114)	3.51 (89)	3.74 (95)	3.90 (99)	3.97 (101)	46.30 (1,176)
Average relative humidity (%)	65.2	62.8	60.6	62.3	66.0	70.3	69.6	71.2	71.3	69.9	68.3	66.3	67.0
Average dew point °F (°C)	22.2 (−5.4)	23.3 (−4.8)	28.6 (−1.9)	38.0 (3.3)	48.7 (9.3)	59.5 (15.3)	64.4 (18.0)	64.1 (17.8)	57.8 (14.3)	46.5 (8.1)	37.1 (2.8)	27.2 (−2.7)	43.2 (6.2)
Source: PRISM

Climate data for Sandy Hook, NJ Ocean Water Temperature (30 N Brick Township)
Month	Jan	Feb	Mar	Apr	May	Jun	Jul	Aug	Sep	Oct	Nov	Dec	Year
Daily mean °F (°C)	37 (3)	36 (2)	40 (4)	46 (8)	55 (13)	62 (17)	69 (21)	72 (22)	68 (20)	59 (15)	51 (11)	43 (6)	53 (12)
Source: NOAA

== Ecology ==
According to the A. W. Kuchler U.S. potential natural vegetation types, Brick Township would have two classifications; both a dominant vegetation type of Northeastern Oak/Pine (110) with a dominant vegetation form of Southern Mixed Forest (26) just inland from the bays and rivers, and a dominant vegetation type of Northern Cordgrass (73) with a dominant vegetation form of Coastal Prairie (20) on the barrier island and near the bays and rivers.

== Notable people ==
People who were born in, residents of, or otherwise closely associated with Brick Township include:

- Joe Acanfora (born 1950), educator and activist who fought to teach earth science in public schools in the early 1970s but was dismissed based upon his acknowledged homosexuality
- Jay Alders (born 1973), fine artist, photographer and graphic designer, who is best known for his original surf art paintings
- Harry Bernstein (1910–2011), author of The Invisible Wall
- Hank Borowy (1916–2004), Major League Baseball All-Star pitcher who played for the New York Yankees, Chicago Cubs, Philadelphia Phillies, Pittsburgh Pirates and Detroit Tigers who lived the majority of his life in Brick Township
- Johnny Buchanan (born 1999), American football linebacker who played for the St. Louis Battlehawks of the XFL
- John Catalano (born 1949), politician who represented the 10th Legislative District in the New Jersey General Assembly from 2020 to 2024
- Nick Catone (born 1981), mixed martial artist who participates in the Ultimate Fighting Championships
- Andrew R. Ciesla (born 1953), politician who served in the New Jersey Senate from 1992 to 2012, where he represented the 10th Legislative District
- Jim Dowd, (born 1968), former player in the National Hockey League (NHL), won a Stanley Cup with the 1994-95 New Jersey Devils and last played for the Philadelphia Flyers
- John Paul Doyle (born 1942), politician who served as majority leader of the New Jersey General Assembly
- Kirsten Dunst (born 1982), actress, grew up in the township before relocating to California
- Dana Eskelson, actress who has performed on television, film and theater
- Andrew Fischer (born 2004), college baseball first baseman for the Milwaukee Brewers organization
- Garrett Graham (born 1986), NFL tight end who plays for the Houston Texans
- Jack Martin (1887–1980), Major League Baseball infielder who played for the 1912 New York Yankees (Highlanders), 1914 Philadelphia Phillies and Boston Braves, who lived out his twilight years in Brick Township and is the namesake of Jack Martin Boulevard
- Tom McCarthy (born 1968), television announcer for the Philadelphia Phillies
- Gregory P. McGuckin (born 1961), politician who has represented the 10th Legislative District in the New Jersey General Assembly since 2012
- Melanie McGuire (born 1972), murderess convicted of killing and dismembering her husband
- Eli Mintz (1904–1988), actor
- Daniel F. Newman (1935–2009), politician who served in the New Jersey General Assembly and as Mayor of Brick Township
- Nick Piantanida (1932–1966), amateur parachute jumper who reached 123,500 feet (37,600 m) with his Strato Jump II balloon on February 2, 1966
- John Sadak (born 1979, class of 1996), television announcer for the Cincinnati Reds, radio/TV sports announcer with Westwood One radio, CBS Sports Network, the ESPN family of networks, Fox Sports 1 and the Triple-A affiliate of the New York Yankees, the Scranton/Wilkes-Barre RailRiders
- Craig Scarpelli (born 1961), retired American soccer goalkeeper who played professionally in the North American Soccer League, United Soccer League and American Soccer League
- Leah Scarpelli (born 2001), soccer player who plays as a defender or midfielder for Brisbane Roar
- Betsy Sholl (born 1945), poet who was poet laureate of Maine from 2006 to 2011
- George Tardiff (1936–2012), football head coach at Benedictine College and Washburn University
- Ja'Sir Taylor (born 1999), American football cornerback for the Los Angeles Chargers of the National Football League
- Art Thoms (born 1947), NFL defensive tackle for the Oakland Raiders (1969–1975) and Philadelphia Eagles (1977)
- Scott Thomsen (born 1993), soccer player who plays as a defender for the Richmond Kickers in the United Soccer League
- Chris Vaughn (born 1976), filmmaker, songwriter and producer, who made the documentary Jerseyboy Hero, which features appearances by Bruce Springsteen and Nick Vallelonga
- George Wirth, singer-songwriter
- Warren Wolf (1927–2019), long-time football coach for Brick Township High School who served on the Brick council as freeholder and in the state assembly
- David W. Wolfe (born 1942), politician who represented the 10th Legislative District in the New Jersey General Assembly from 1992 until 2020
- Joey Zalinsky (born 2003), soccer player

Preceded by Mantoloking	Beaches of New Jersey	Succeeded by Dover Beaches North
