= Echo Movement =

American reggae band

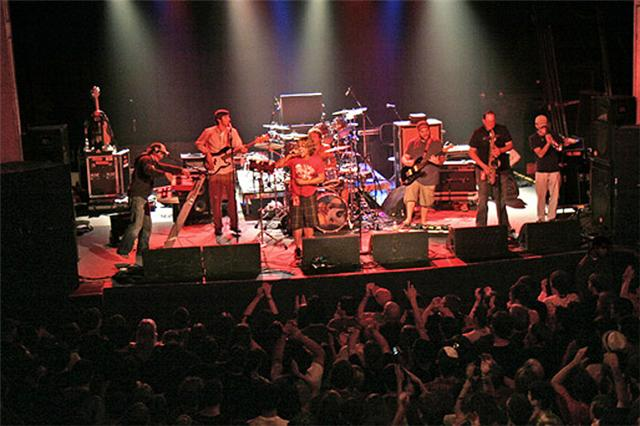
- Echo Movement in concert

Background information
- Origin: New Jersey, United States
- Genres: Reggae, reggae rock
- Years active: 2004–present
- Label: Independent
- Members: Stephen Fowler; David Fowler; CB; Matthew Lepek; Jonathan Butts; DG
- Past members: Ed Davidoski; Justin Hernandez; Chris Gunderud; Nick Afflitto
- Website: Official website

Echo Movement is an American reggae band based in New Jersey. As of 2012, they are a seven-piece band.

Echo Movement performed on the House of Marley Stage on the Warped Tour 2012, according to the tour's official website. The band released their fifth studio album, "Love and the Human Outreach." The album, which was listed in the "2012 Most Anticipated Albums" on www.ThePier.org., was met with strong enthusiasm as rumors of "space reggae" began to appear on CNN, Wired Magazine and Space.com. The album cover artwork was painted by fine-artist Jay Alders, who also painted the cover of the band's 2009 release, "In The Ocean."

== History ==
Echo Movement was originally formed in 2004 by brothers Stephen and David Fowler. They recorded and released a self-titled album in June 2005. The album generated regional cult success.

In 2006, Drum Corps International veteran CB joined the band. Among the three, plus a series of guest musicians, Echo Movement independently released their second full-length album in June 2006, On My Way.

With the addition of a horn trio, Echo Movement expanded to an eight-piece band in 2008. The band released their third independent album in June 2009, In The Ocean. The album includes a track with guest musician Chris Thatcher, drummer for the rock/ska band Streetlight Manifesto, and a track introduction taken from a public lecture by theoretical physicist Stephen Hawking.

In The Ocean was met with immense popular growth and a debut national tour, including a leg of the Warped Tour 2009. The tour, "Echo Movement In The Ocean Tour '09" was funded by a series of sponsors, including clothing, surf and wellness companies. This proved a breakthrough tour for Echo Movement, even receiving accolades from Warped Tour owner Kevin Lyman, who mentioned the band as "great" in a Fuel TV interview.

In The Ocean's album cover was painted by surf artist Jay Alders. According to various resources, including Alders' website, it was painted while the album was recorded. The original artwork is called Burning Inspiration.

On September 13, 2011, Echo Movement released another album called Music Played On. The eight track, full-length album consists of remakes from Echo Movement's first two albums, which were discontinued in June 2011 and are no longer available. The cover artwork for Music Played On features a stencil from a vintage Roland RE-301, cousin of the classic Roland RE-201. This analog effects unit was instrumental in the production of the album, according to a May 2011 press release from the band. The press release also names Music Played On as the first known contemporary album to intentionally use binaural beats.

On September 4, 2012, Echo Movement released Love and the Human Outreach. According to a band press release, this album is a "romantic personification of theoretical physics."

According to the band's website, the name "Echo Movement" is a reference to Generation Y, also called the "Echo Generation".

== Major Tours and other works ==
In Fall 2009, Echo Movement joined Streetlight Manifesto as support for the first leg of their US tour.

Over the Winter 2009–2010, member and principal songwriter David Fowler performed on Streetlight Manifesto's 2010 release 99 Songs of Revolution. The performance was an organ solo on Streetlight's cover of the Bad Religion song "Skyscraper." The album consists of covers of various artists' songs, including Paul Simon, NOFX and The Postal Service.

The June 2010 issue of Keyboard Magazine features an article by David Fowler explaining the "reggae bubble," a rhythmic keyboard pattern widely used in reggae.

In Summer 2010, Echo Movement took its second consecutive run as part of Warped Tour 2010, joining the tour in early August and taking it to the end. This was part of a six-week US tour sponsored by artist Jay Alders, longboard giants Original Skateboards and one of the world's leading vaporizer companies Silver Surfer Vaporizers (SSV).

In Summer 2011, the band linked up with SSV again for the "Silver Surfer Vaporizers Presents: Echo Movement Summer 2011 Tour." The six-week US tour also includes parts of Canada. They immediately followed up with a fall tour.

In Summer 2012, Echo Movement performed on the entire Vans Warped Tour.

== Genre ==
Echo Movement belongs to an alternative-reggae cross-music genre that includes alternative music, reggae, surf rock, world music and several other influences. Other bands in this genre include Bedouin Soundclash, John Brown's Body, Sublime, No Doubt, Slightly Stoopid, Pepper and even music legends The Police and Paul Simon.

In a June 2011 press release released by the band's publicist, Echo Movement identified their style as "new reggae."

== Content, Sociopolitical and Cultural Contributions ==
Echo Movement has been outspoken about certain social and political subjects. Among the band's strongest support and contributions have been to the National Organization for the Reformation of Marijuana Laws (NORML). The band has released two controversial songs about marijuana law and culture: "Ganja" (2005) takes a historical perspective on prohibition in the United States while citing Harry Anslinger, and "I Think God Smokes Weed" (2009) has a creative approach to the ethical implications behind marijuana. Both have been featured on the NORML Daily Audio Stash, an online podcast, as well as in various other media outlets.

Five percent of In The Ocean sales are contributed to SurfAid International, a humanitarian organization dedicated to helping isolated coastal communities in Indonesia.

== Discography ==
- Echo Movement - 2005 (discontinued)
- On My Way - 2006 (discontinued)
- In The Ocean - 2009
- Music Played On - 2011
- Love and the Human Outreach - 2012
