= Breton Woods, New Jersey =

Populated place in Ocean County, New Jersey, US

- Unincorporated community
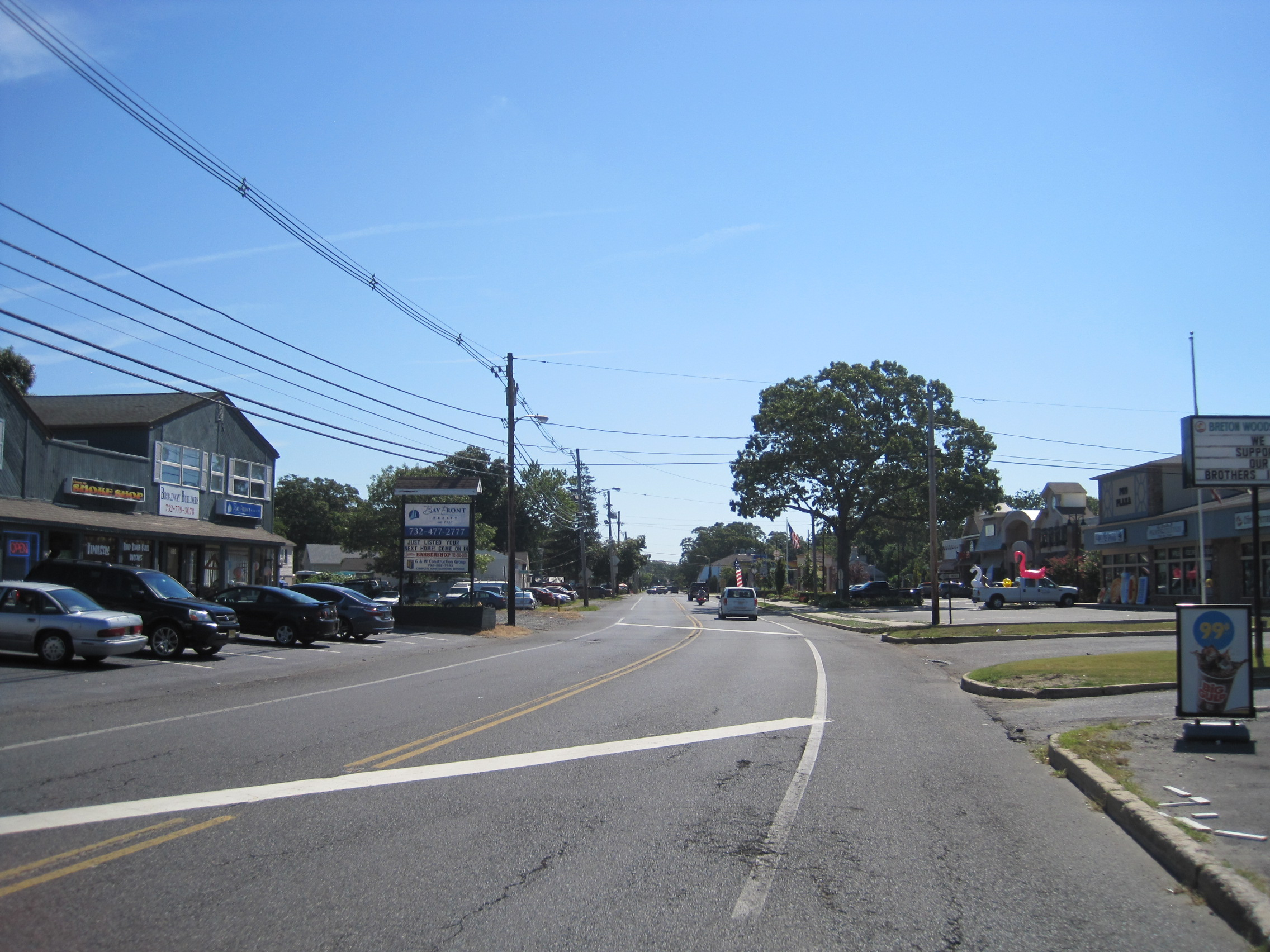
- At the center of Breton Woods along CR 528

- Breton Woods' location in Ocean County (Inset: Ocean County in New Jersey) Breton Woods, New Jersey (New Jersey) Breton Woods, New Jersey (the United States)
- Coordinates: 40°02′44″N 74°06′31″W
- Country: United States
- State: New Jersey
- County: Ocean
- Township: Brick
- Elevation: 13 ft (4 m)
- GNIS feature ID: 874918

Breton Woods is an unincorporated community located within Brick Township, in Ocean County, in the U.S. state of New Jersey. The community is located near the Metedeconk River and is bisected by Mantoloking Road (County Route 528). Except for commercial businesses located along Mantoloking Road, the area is made up of bungalows dotting the small roads throughout the area. A wood area of 31 acres near the community is known as Breton Woods. It was owned by the Archdiocese of Trenton, which had once intended or create a cemetery.

== History ==
Historical population
Census	Pop.	Note	%±
1950	1,619		—
1960	1,292		−20.2%
Population sources: 1950 1960 1970; 1980 1990 2000; 2010

Breton Woods was established in the 1930s when property developers laid out a community of summer homes. A post office was established at Breton Woods in 1937, and remained in operation until it was discontinued in 1960.

The community was listed as an unincorporated community in the 1950 U.S. census under the name Breton Woods-Osbornville; and as Breton Woods in the 1960 U.S. census.
