= Donavon Frankenreiter =

American musician and surfer

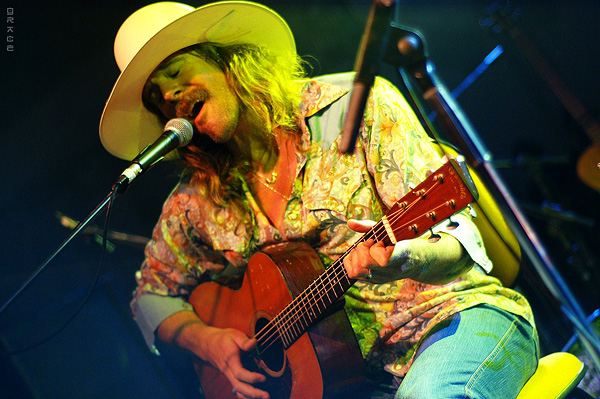
- Donavon Frankenreiter on stage

Background information
- Born: December 10, 1972 (age 53)
- Origin: Downey, California, United States
- Genres: Soft rock; Surf rock
- Occupations: Singer, songwriter, guitarist
- Years active: 2000-present
- Labels: Lost Highway, Universal, Wrasse, Liquid Tambourine Records
- Website: http://www.donavonf.com/

Donavon Frankenreiter (born December 10, 1972) is an American musician and surfer. His debut self-titled album was released in 2004 on Brushfire Records through Universal Music.

== Career ==
Frankenreiter was born in Downey, California, United States. In November 2007, he toured throughout Brazil on the Mostra Alma Surf Festival with bands, Animal Liberation Orchestra, G. Love and Matt Costa, along with Surf Artists Jay Alders, Nathan Gibbs, Céline Chat, Surf Photographer Sean Davey, and Surf Film Maker Sunny Abberton.

An acoustic EP of cover songs called Recycled Recipes landed in 2007, with the polished full-length Pass It Around following in 2008. For the Pass It Around Tour, Donavon teamed up with surf artist and friend, Jay Alders to design a Limited Edition Tour Poster.

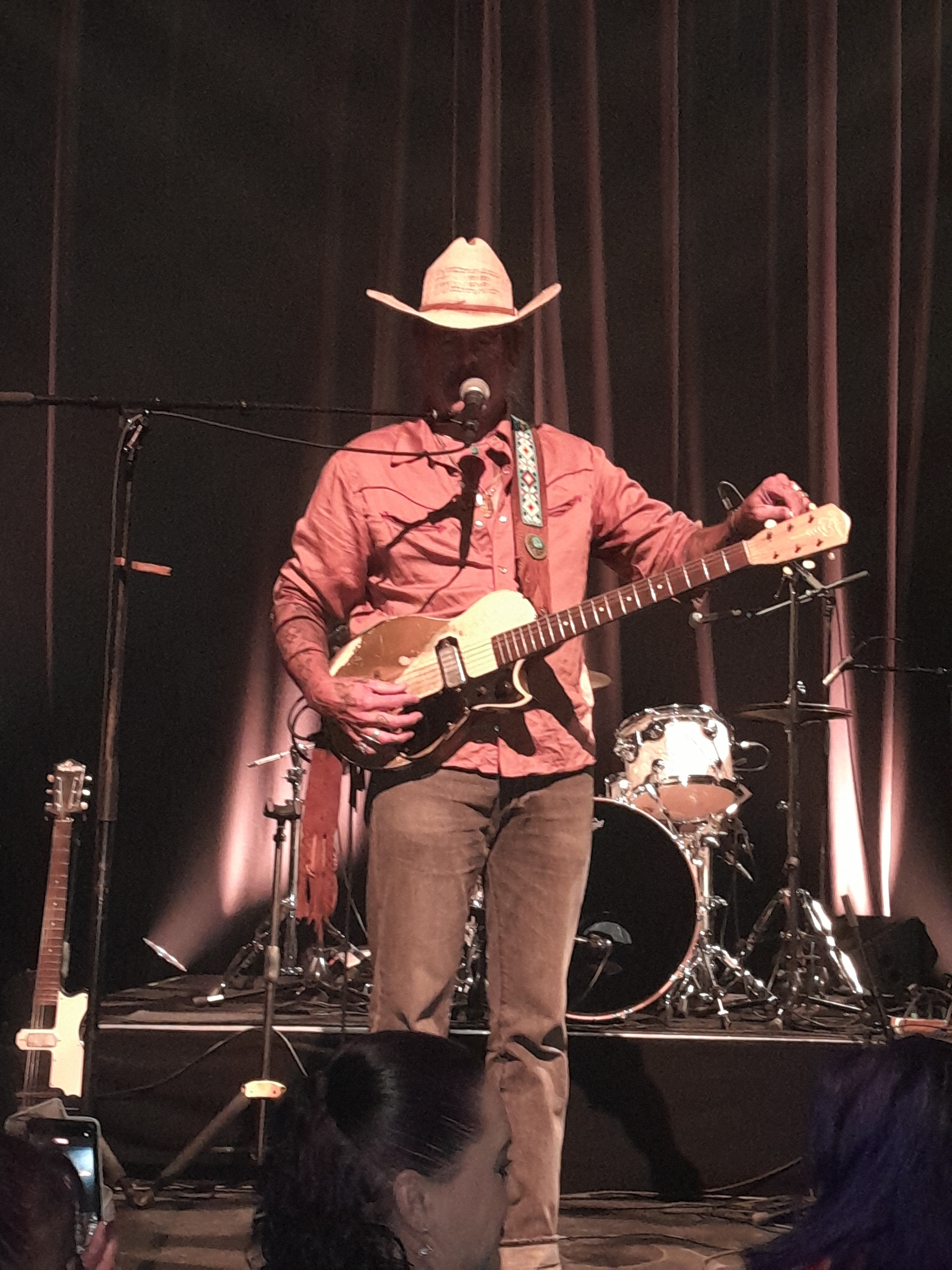
Donavon Frankenreiter in concert in Christchurch, New Zealand 2025

In 2010, Frankenreiter left Lost Highway Records, and formed his own label, Liquid Tambourine Records. He subsequently recorded and released his fourth studio album of original material entitled Glow, which was produced by Mark Weinberg.

== Discography ==
=== Solo ===
==== Albums ====
List of solo albums, with selected chart positions
Title	Album details	Peak chart positions		Certifications
Title	Album details	US	AUS	Certifications
Donavon Frankenreiter	Released: 2004; Format: CD	165	29	ARIA: Gold
Move by Yourself	Released: 2006; Format: CD	105	24	ARIA: Gold
Pass It Around	Released: 2008; Format: CD	98	16	
Revisited	Released: 2010; Format: CD			
Glow	Released: 2010; Format: CD			
Start Livin'	Released: 2012; Format: CD			
The Heart	Released: 2013; Format: CD			
Revisited 2	Released: 2019; Format: CD			
Get Outta Your Mind	Released: 2024; Format: CD, streaming			

==== Extended plays ====
List of albums, with Australian chart positions
Title	Album details	Peak chart positions	Certifications
Title	Album details	AUS	Certifications
Some Live Songs (with Jack Johnson and G.Love)	Released: 2005; Format: CD	31	
Recycled Recipes EP	Released: 2007; Format: CD	-	
Recycled Recipes, Vol. 2 EP	Released: 2011; Format: CD	-	

=== with Sunchild ===
- Mr Jesus (1994)
- Barefoot & Live (1997)
- California Honey (2000)
- The Galaxy Session (2009)

== Video game appearances ==
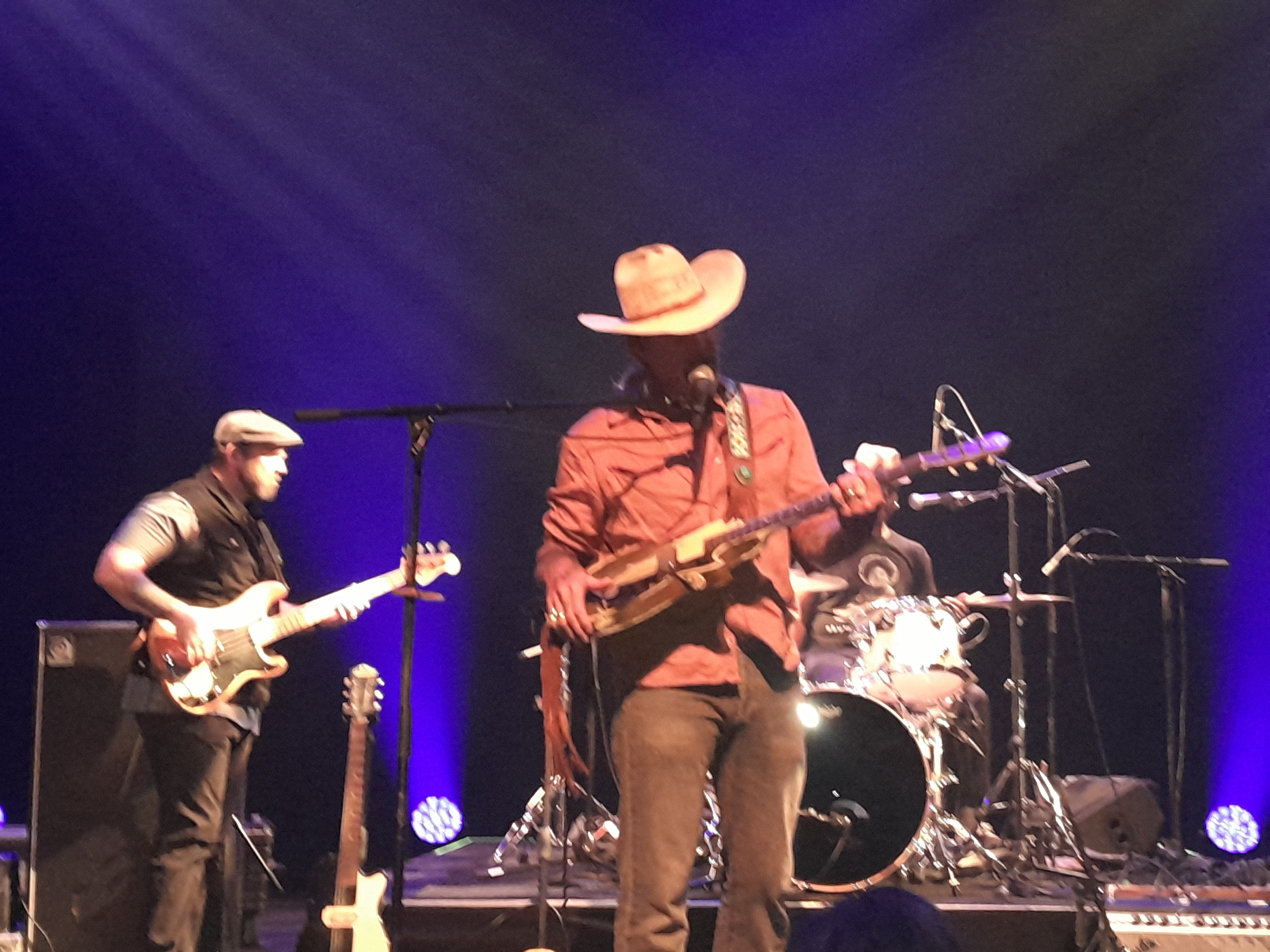
Donavon Frankenreiter in concert in Christchurch, New Zealand 2025

Frankenreiter is a playable character in the video game Kelly Slater's Pro Surfer.
