= Harry Bernstein =

American writer

- Born: Harry Louis Bernstein; May 30, 1910; Stockport, England
- Died: June 3, 2011 (aged 101); Brooklyn, New York City, U.S.
- Occupation: Writer
- Writing career
- Period: 2007–2011
- Genres: Memoir, Non-fiction

Harry Louis Bernstein (May 30, 1910 – June 3, 2011) was a British-born American writer. Bernstein lived in Brick Township, New Jersey. He died at the age of 101, on June 3, 2011.

== Biographical information ==
Before his retirement at age 62, Bernstein worked for movie production companies as a script reader and as a magazine editor for trade magazines. He wrote freelance articles for such publications as Popular Mechanics, Family Circle and Newsweek.

== Writing ==
The Invisible Wall: A Love Story That Broke Barriers, his first-published book, dealt with a number of topics, including with his long-suffering mother Ada's struggle to feed her 6 children, an abusive, alcoholic father, the anti-Semitism Bernstein and his Jewish neighbors encountered growing up in a Cheshire mill town (Stockport, now part of Greater Manchester) in northwest England; the loss of Jews and Christians from the community in World War I, and the Romeo and Juliet romance experienced by his sister Lily and her Christian boyfriend. The book was started when Bernstein was 93 and published in 2007, when he was 96. The loneliness he encountered following the death of his wife, Ruby, in 2002, after 67 years of marriage, was the catalyst for the work.

The Dream (2008) is centered on his family's move to the West Side of Chicago in 1922 when he was twelve. The Golden Willow (2009), chronicles his married life and later years. A fourth book, What Happened to Rose, was set to be published posthumously in 2012. It was published in 2013 in Italian, under the title La Sognatrice Bugiarda (translated as The Lying Dreamer).

== Sources ==
- Article from International Herald Tribune
- Article from South Coast Today
- Article from New York Times
- Article from Boston Globe
- Harry Bernstein's 100th Birthday
