= Mishka (musician) =

Bermudian reggae musician

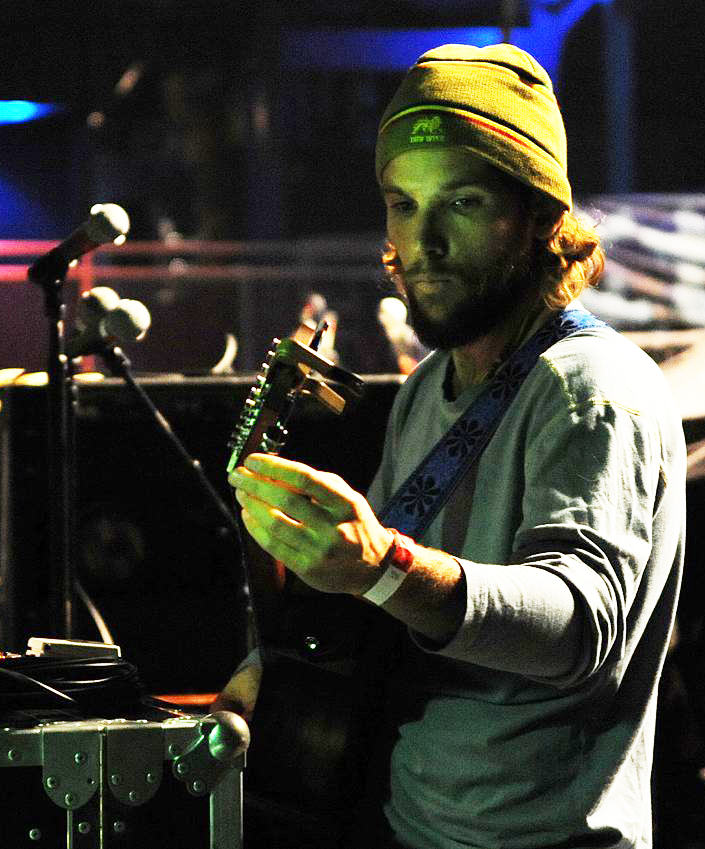

Background information
- Birth name: Alexander Mishka Frith
- Born: 1974 (age 50–51); Bermuda
- Origin: Nova Scotia, Canada
- Genres: Reggae
- Occupation(s): Singer-songwriter, musician
- Years active: 1997–present
- Labels: Creation, Sony Music, Cornerstone RAS, Mailboat
- Website: www.mishka.com

Mishka (born Alexander Mishka Frith, 5 March 1974) is a reggae musician from Bermuda. He released his first self-titled album Mishka in 1999 and had a hit single in the UK with "Give You All The Love". He is currently signed to Jimmy Buffett’s record label, Mailboat Records, and is touring in support of his latest album, 'Ocean is my Potion'. He is also the face of ECO-Neill, surf-clothing company O'Neill's new eco-friendly apparel line.

== Biography ==
Mishka Frith was born to a Bermudian father and Nova Scotian mother, and grew up on his family's boat, sailing from island to island in the Caribbean. Mishka and his sisters (one of whom is also a music artist, Heather Nova, the other television news reporter and model Susannah Frith) were home schooled until their high school years. His uncle, Michael K. Frith, worked for The Jim Henson Company, and was a creator of Miss Piggy, and of the television shows Fraggle Rock and Between the Lions. His son, Mishka's first-cousin, is folk singer Jonathan Frith. In addition to developing his skills as a musician, Mishka also spent countless hours honing his windsurfing talents. He represented Bermuda in 1991 and 1992 in the windsurfing world championships, before concentrating primarily on his music career.

Mishka was signed to Alan McGee's Creation Records in the UK in 1997. In 1999, Mishka released his first single, "Give You All The Love" which was an immediate success charting in the Top 40 in the UK and Top 10 in Japan. Mishka released his self-titled debut album Mishka (including Heather Nova on backing vocals) later that year which received much critical acclaim in both the UK and Japan.

Mishka's second album One Tree was produced by Swedish producer Martin Terefe (KT Tunstall, James Morrison) in 2005. On his third album, Above the Bones, Mishka worked with longtime Sly and Robbie guitarist, Daryl Thompson, who played for many years with Peter Tosh and Black Uhuru. It was at this time that Mishka met actor Matthew McConaughey. The two shared a deeply rooted appreciation for reggae music and it was a natural fit for McConaughey to sign Mishka to his j.k. livin record label. In February 2009, Above the Bones debuted at number one on the Billboard Reggae Charts, and Mishka was named 2009's Best New Artist in the singer/songwriter category by iTunes.

Mishka released his album, Talk About, on 30 March 2010. It again debuted at number one on the iTunes Reggae Chart and includes the song "Homegrown" that features Willie Nelson. Talk About also features "Stars Will Be Shining" and "Give Them Love", produced by Butch Walker (Pete Yorn, P!nk, Fall Out Boy).

Mishka began actively touring in support of Talk About in the spring of 2010. At the same time, Mishka and surf-clothing giant, O'Neill, entered into a partnership. O'Neill, the original California surf, snow and lifestyle brand, manufactures wetsuits, drysuits, sports clothing and accessories and is currently developing an eco-friendly apparel line, "ECO-Neill", which Mishka will have a hand in designing.

In 2012, Mishka released his EP album "Ocean Is My Potion" on Mailboat Records, featuring his long-time friend and legendary musician Jimmy Buffett and cover album artwork by surf genre fine artist Jay Alders.

His album The Journey, released in November 2013, topped the Billboard Reggae Albums chart in January 2014, his fifth album to achieve that position.

== Discography ==
- Mishka (1999), Creation Records/Sony Music
- In Dub – compilation album (2000), Sony Music
- One Tree (2005), Cornerstone RAS
- Above the Bones (2009), j.k. livin'
- Guy With a Guitar (2009), j.k. livin'
- Talk About (2010), j.k. livin'
- Anything Anytime Anywhere (2012), WorldSound
- Ocean Is My Potion (2013), Mailboat Records
- The Journey (2013), Mailboat
- Roots Fidelity (2015), Mishka Music
- Way Out Of Babylon (2017), Mishka Music
- In an Instant - Featured with Gisto, (2019), Historical
- This Love (2022)
