= George Wirth =

American singer-songwriter

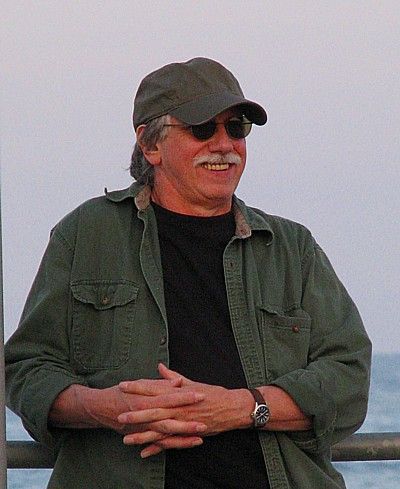
Singer-songwriter George Wirth on the boardwalk in Asbury Park, New Jersey

George Wirth is a singer-songwriter who lives in Brick, New Jersey. Born in 1947, he only began performing professionally as a musician in 1995. Wirth has been called one of New Jersey's finest singer-songwriters. He is the recipient of the 2010 Asbury Music Award in the Top Male Acoustic category. He has also been nominated for Best Local Release and Best Song. Wirth won the Jersey Acoustic Musicians Award for Top Male Songwriter in both 2010 and 2011. He was the recipient of the 2011 Jersey Acoustic Music Award for album of the year for The Last Good Kiss. Wirth's other album is The Lights of Brigantine. Wirth has been a resident of the New Jersey Shore since his early teens, and is an active member of the Asbury Park music community.
