= Drew Brophy =

American painter

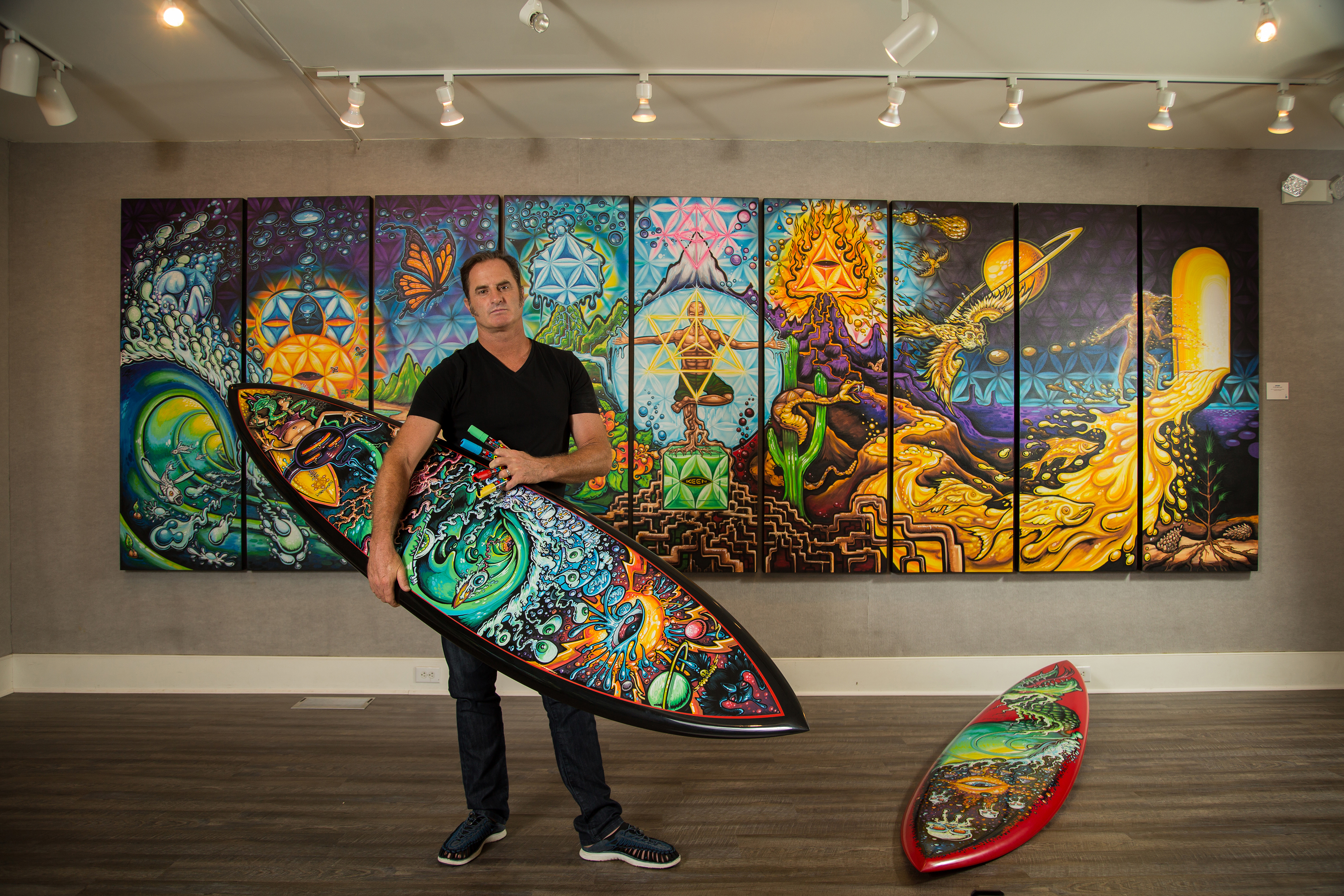
Drew Brophy Retrospective Exhibit at Myrtle Beach Museum of Art 2018

Drew Brophy is an American artist born in 1971. Known as a "surf artist" Brophy is best known for his surfboard paintings and distinctive painting style, using Uni-Posca water-based paint pens.

== Biography ==
A self-taught artist, Brophy began painting on surfboards when he first began to surf in his native South Carolina. Originally, Brophy set out to be a professional surfer, and he traveled internationally using artwork to help pay for his surf adventures. He was commissioned multiple artworks and became a professional.

After living and surfing in Hawaii in the 1990s, Brophy moved to California in 1996 as a career decision. He now lives with his wife and their son.

In 2018 Brophy's Autobiography titled Painting Surfboards and Chasing Waves was released on Amazon.

== Art ==
McFly's Dougie Poynter plays a Music Man Sterling Bass, featuring a custom paint job by Brophy.

In spring of 2011, Crystal Cove Media Production Company produced a television show called The Paint Shop with Drew Brophy, which aired on Southern California local television channels, including Cox and Time Warner. The Paint Shop is a reality show which takes the viewers behind the scenes of Drew's art studio and projects.

In 2012 Brophy featured in the seminal book Surf Graphics.

== Surfing ==
In May 2011, Brophy teamed up with whitewater expert and film-maker Seth Warren, to become the first ever to standup paddleboard the entire length of the 225 miles of the Colorado River between Lee's Ferry and Diamond Creek. The expedition took 16 days and was run at a time when the water level was its highest since 1983. They navigated over 125 rapids, 42 of which were rated between 5g and 10g, on the Grand Canyon scale of 1-10g.
