= Adamston, New Jersey =

Populated place in Ocean County, New Jersey, US

- Unincorporated community
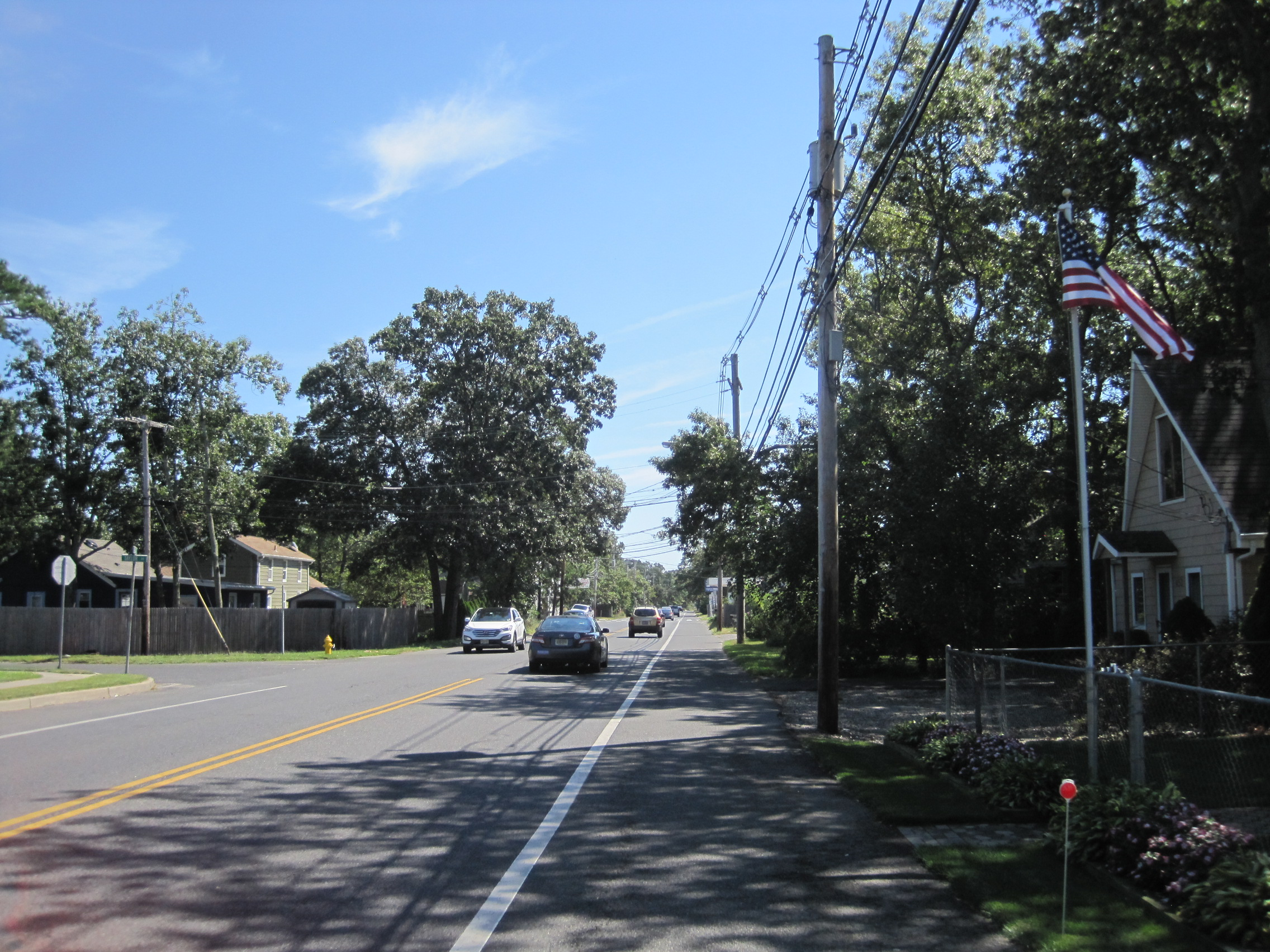
- Mantoloking Road (County Route 528) in Adamston

- Location in Ocean County Location in New Jersey Location in the United States
- Coordinates: 40°02′43″N 74°05′42″W
- Country: United States
- State: New Jersey
- County: Ocean
- Township: Brick
- Elevation: 9.8 ft (3 m)
- Time zone: UTC−05:00 (Eastern (EST))
  - Summer (DST): UTC−05:00 (EDT)
- Area codes: 732/848
- GNIS feature ID: 874258

Adamston is an unincorporated community located within Brick Township, Ocean County, in the U.S. state of New Jersey. County Route 528 travels through Adamston, leading to neighboring Mantoloking to the east, on the Jersey Shore. The area is otherwise mostly made up of small bungalows spread along numerous residential roads in Adamston.
