= Move by Yourself =

Studio album by Donavon Frankenreiter
- Released: June 6, 2006 (US)
- Recorded: 2006
- Genre: Rock
- Length: 44:29
- Label: Lost Highway
- Producer: Neil Pogue, Jim Devito

Donavon Frankenreiter chronology
Donavon Frankenreiter (2004)	Move by Yourself (2006)	Recycled Recipes (2007)

Professional ratings
Review scores
Source	Rating
Allmusic	4/5 stars
Thatdoesntsoundright	Positive

Move by Yourself is the title of Donavon Frankenreiter's second album, released on June 6, 2006 (see 2006 in music).

== Track listing ==
1. "Move by Yourself" – 5:16
2. "The Way It Is" – 3:49
3. "By Your Side" – 4:36
4. "These Arms" (Donavon Frankenreiter, Matt Grundy) – 2:59
5. "Let It Go" – 4:11
6. "Fool" – 6:01
7. "Everytime" – 3:24
8. "That's Too Bad (Byron Jam)" – 2:42
9. "Girl Like You" – 3:07
10. "All Around Us" – 4:51
11. "Beautiful Day" – 3:26

- All songs written by Donavon Frankenreiter except where indicated.

== Personnel ==
- Donavon Frankenreiter - Guitar, Producer, Audio Production, Vocals, Composer
- Patrick Evan Mcmillan - Vocals (Background)
- Neil Pogue - Producer, Mixing
- Benjamin Wright - Strings, String Arrangements
- Jimmy Hill - Vocals (Background)
- Cherokee - Vocals (Background)
- Eric Brigmond - Keyboards
- Scott Soens - Photography
- Eulene Sherman - Vocals (Background)
- AVOP - Vocals (Background)
- Craig Barnette - Percussion, Drums
- Chad Early - Art Direction
- Tom Haller - Percussion
- Saboria Lamar Napolean - Vocals (Background)
- Kizzime Walkers - Vocals (Background)
- Matt Grundy - Composer, Guitar (Bass), Vocals (Background)
- Kim Buie - A&R
- Jim DeVito - Engineer
- Brian Gardner - Mastering

== Charts ==
Chart (2006)	Peak position
Australian (ARIA Charts)	24

== Certifications ==
Region	Certification	Certified units/sales
Australia (ARIA)	Gold	35,000^{^}
^{^} Shipments figures based on certification alone.
