= Donavon Frankenreiter (album) =

Studio album by Donavon Frankenreiter
- Released: May 11, 2004 (US)
- Recorded: 2003
- Genre: Rock
- Length: 37:56
- Label: Brushfire Records
- Producer: Jack Johnson and Mario Caldato, Jr

Donavon Frankenreiter chronology
Donavon Frankenreiter (2004)	Move by Yourself (2006)

Professional ratings
Review scores
Source	Rating
Allmusic	4/5 stars

Donavon Frankenreiter is an eponymously titled debut album, released in the United States on May 11, 2004 (see 2004 in music). Produced by longtime friend Jack Johnson and regular Johnson collaborator Mario Caldato, Jr, the album sold modestly in the United States, peaking at number 7 on the Billboard Top Heatseekers and 169 on the Billboard 200. The album performed relatively better in Australia, where Frankenreiter was already well known through regular support gigs with Johnson; also he embarked on an extensive tour of small venues to promote the album. The album reached the top forty of the ARIA albums chart and received gold accreditation (sales in excess of 35,000 units) in 2005.

== Track listing ==
All songs written by Donavon Frankenreiter except where indicated.

1. "It Don't Matter" – 3:05
2. "Differently The Same" - 4:23
3. "Free" (Donavon Frankenreiter, Jack Johnson) – 2:28
  - Performed by Donavon Frankenreiter and Jack Johnson
4. "On My Mind" – 3:07
5. "Our Love" – 2:29
6. "What 'Cha Know About" – 3:06
  - Performed by Donavon Frankenreiter and G Love
7. "Butterfly" – 2:50
8. "Bend in the Road" – 2:54
9. "Day Dreamer" – 2:31
10. "Make You Mine" – 2:52
11. "Call Me Papa" – 3:45
12. "Heading Home" – 2:16
13. "So Far Away" – 3:13
14. "Swing On Down" – 3:20

== Charts ==
Chart (2004/05)	Peak position
Australian (ARIA Charts)	29

== Certifications ==
Region	Certification	Certified units/sales
Australia (ARIA)	Gold	35,000^{^}
^{^} Shipments figures based on certification alone.
