= Arcy =

American graffiti artist and muralist

ARCY
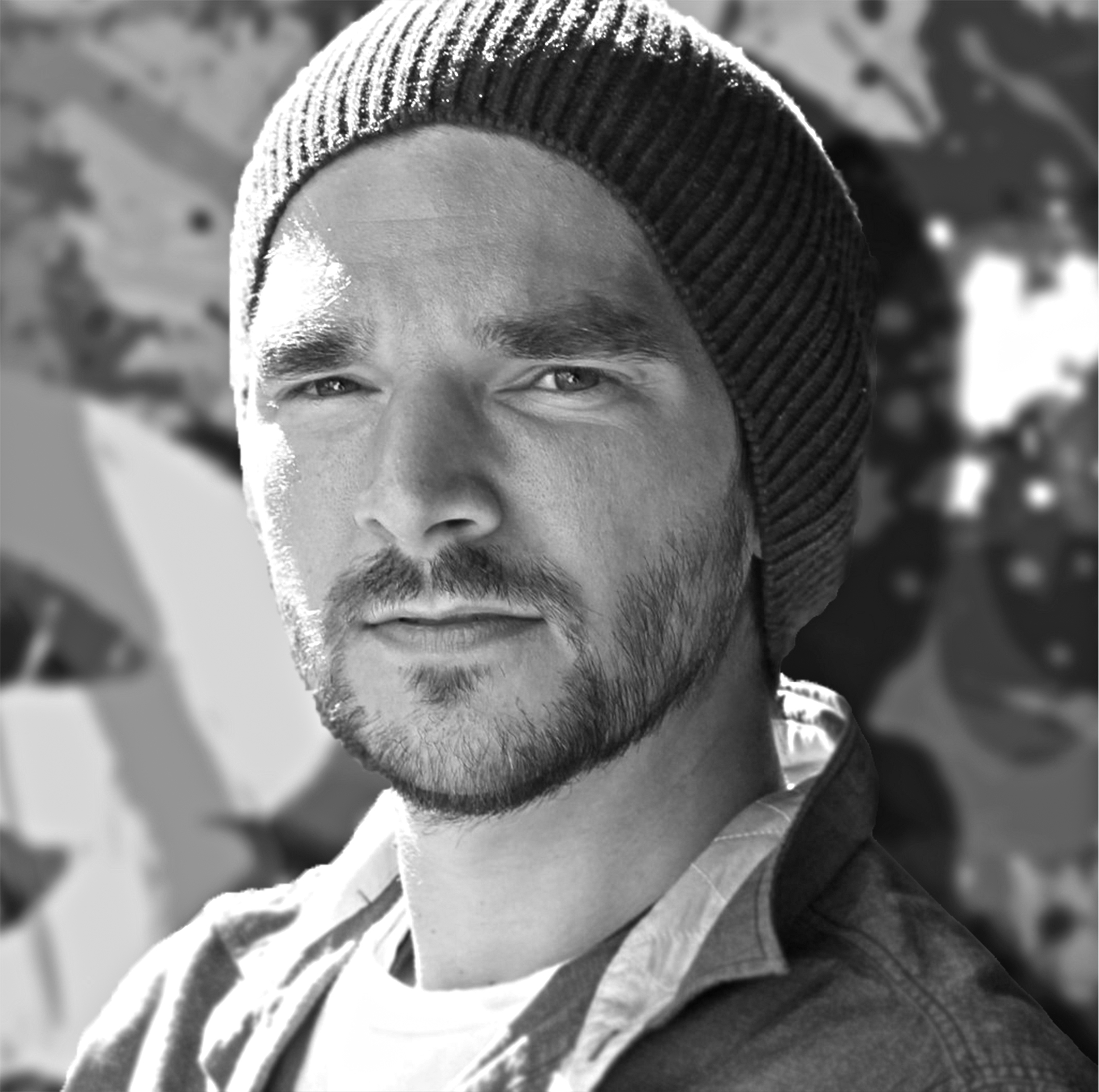
- Born: Ryan Christenson; Connecticut, U.S.
- Known for: Murals; Live painting
- Style: Graffiti
- Years active: 2003–present
- Website: arcyofficial.com

Ryan Christenson (known by the pseudonym ARCY) is an American graffiti artist and muralist from Connecticut. His work includes murals and live paintings in the United States, England, Portugal, Greece, Ireland, and Australia. Through his career Christenson has worked with Smithsonian Institution, Major League Baseball, National Park Service and Disney's Fine Art collection. His notable work includes horse coliseum mural at the 2019 Big E, and2020 Kobe Bryant mural for the super bowl in Miami.

== Early life and education ==
Ryan Christenson was born in Connecticut. As a teenager, Christenson often visited New Haven to see new pieces of graffiti art there and eventually joined the New Haven-based graffiti artist collective, the High Impact Crew. Christenson graduated from Mark T. Sheehan High School in Wallingford and attended Naugatuck Valley Community College in Waterbury where he studied horticulture. He was inducted into Sheehan High School's Hall of Fame in 2019.

== Career ==
In 2012, Christenson started an art and design company called RC Murals. In 2015, he went on a tour where he first used the pseudonym, "ARCY", and painted 30 walls in the United States, Europe, and Canada. In 2016, he continued traveling, painting murals and performing live painting demonstrations and also created a 30 by 130-foot mural in Chicago and 7 works featuring local wildlife in Porter County, Indiana. He also won the Mural Marathon in Reno, Nevada with his painting of a macaw.

In 2017, he created an installation in Sydney, Australia and a mural in Waterford, Ireland. He also painted a mural of famed Hartford, Connecticut residents (Mark Twain, Samuel Colt, and Katharine Hepburn) in that city. He again toured around the country painting murals and engaging in live painting demonstrations in locations like Helena, Montana, various cities in Wyoming, and at the East Texas State Fair. His mural in Helena of a miner panning for gold was named one of the 50 best murals in the United States by Parade. Also in 2017, Christenson began creating pieces for Disney's Fine Art collection and gained a permanent display at the Walt Disney Hometown Museum.

In 2018, he donated a mural portrait of Ella Fitzgerald to Manchester High School in Manchester, Connecticut. That was the first appearance on his ARCY Live! tour of the United States and Canada that year. On that tour, he created a large-scale mural of Elvis Presley during Elvis Fest in Tupelo, Mississippi and painted 15 live murals at the Pacific National Exhibition in Vancouver, Canada. In April 2019, his graffiti art featuring notable sports figures and moments on the walls of Dan Patrick's "man cave" studio was unveiled on The Dan Patrick Show. In August of that year, Christenson made an appearance at the Nebraska State Fair.

== Style ==
Christenson creates figurative murals using spray paint, with subjects including portraits and animals. Daily Nutmeg described his work as combining photorealistic subjects with graffiti techniques.
