= WBGD =

High school radio station in Brick, New Jersey (1974–2010)

Coordinates: 40.105124°N 74.129627°W

Brick, New Jersey; United States
- Broadcast area: Brick/Lakewood/Point Pleasant, New Jersey
- Frequency: 91.9 (MHz)

Programming
- Format: Defunct (was variety)

Ownership
- Owner: Brick Public Schools; (Brick Township Board of Education)

History
- First air date: 1970s
- Call sign meaning: "Brick Green Dragons"

Technical information
- Licensing authority: FCC
- Class: A
- ERP: 195 watts
- HAAT: 17 meters (56 ft)

Links
- Public license information: Public file; LMS

WBGD (91.9 FM) was a high school radio station based in Brick Township, New Jersey, started at Brick Township High School (next to the school library) and later broadcast from Brick Memorial High School. The station went on the air in the 1970s as a 10-watt educational licensed station playing a variety of music formats. There were such shows as DJ Rock and Wilty, Burning Vern & Traveling Tom, and the Snake and The CEVO Nedved Show.

== Silent ==
The station experienced transmitter problems in 2007 and went off the air due to a lack of funds to make the necessary repairs. As of September 1, 2010, the license has officially been forfeited to the FCC.
