= Zak Noyle =

American photographer

- Born: Zakary Noyle; June 26, 1985 (age 41)
- Known for: Surf Photography
- Notable work: Wave of Change - Trash photo taken in Indonesia; Perfect Day; Aquatography Workshop
- Awards: Surfer Magazine - 2011 Photo of the Year

Zakary Noyle (born June 26, 1985) is a professional surf and wave photographer living on the island of Oahu in Hawaii, best known for his large wave photographs.

== Early life ==
Noyle is a third generation professional photographer. His father, Ric Noyle is a commercial photographer in Hawaii and his grandfather shot with the first 3D camera and was an aerial photographer during World War II. Growing up in the Hawaiian Islands, Noyle quickly developed a passion for the ocean. He became a state champion swimmer while attending Punahou School and was a contributing staff photographer for Transworld Surf Magazine.

Noyle's experience with surf and wave photography started when he began taking a disposable camera into the water at Sandy Beach to photograph his friends.

== Career ==
In 2010, he became a staff photographer with Surfer Magazine, and became the magazine’s senior staff photographer when he was 25 years old. His work has appeared in magazines ESPN The Magazine, Sports Illustrated, National Geographic and in advertisements for companies such as Billabong and Chanel. Noyle's professional career has taken him to Indonesia, Tahiti, Hawaii, Japan, California, Australia and Hong Kong, and for clients Lulu Lemon, Chanel, Iron Man Triathlon, Red Bull, surf competitions and more.

Professional surfer Jamie O'Brien said of Noyle, “He pictures what he wants in his head and then he captures it on camera. It's a mind game, I think it's awesome.”

In 2014, Noyle created a free educational workshop for aspiring surf and wave photographers called The Aquatography Workshops. This annual workshop covers all areas of underwater photography.

== Exhibitions ==
=== Solo exhibitions ===
- 2015: Waikiki Parc Hotel, Waikiki, Hawaii
- 2015: Greenroom Gallery, Haleiwa, HI
- 2015: Greenroom Gallery, Waikiki, HI

=== Group exhibitions ===
- 2015: Greenroom Festival, Japan, HI

== Published photos ==
- Surfer Magazine cover (September 2010, September 2014, January 2015)

== Awards and recognitions ==
- Annenberg Space for Photography, Los Angeles – 2010 international sports photographers
- Surfer Magazine's – 2011 Photo of the Year Award – Perfect Day
- Red Bull Illume Award – 2013 Best Sports Action Photo – Sunset Ride

== See also ==
- Chris Burkard - California surf photographer
