= The Invisible Wall (memoir) =

2007 memoir by Harry Bernstein

- Author: Harry Bernstein
- Language: English
- Genre: Memoir
- Publisher: Ballantine Books
- Publication date: 2007
- Publication place: United States
- Media type: Print (Paperback)
- Pages: 297 pages
- ISBN: 0345495802
- OCLC: 74916343
- Dewey Decimal: 813/.54 B
- LC Class: PS3552.E7345 Z46 2007

The Invisible Wall: A Love Story That Broke Barriers is a 2007 memoir by British-American author Harry Bernstein. It was Bernstein's first published book; he started writing it at the age of 93.

The book is about Bernstein's childhood in Northwest England, the relationship between Jews and Christians in the community, and the Romeo and Juliet romance that occurred between his sister and her Christian boyfriend.

== Plot summary ==
The book takes place in the mill town of Stockport, England (now part of Greater Manchester). Harry Bernstein and his family live on a narrow street that is divided by an "invisible wall", with Jewish families (including Harry's) on one side, and Christian families on the other. Harry's father is an alcoholic who frequently abuses his wife and children, and gambles away much of his meager income.

Harry's older sister, Lily, falls in love with a Christian neighbor, Arthur. The two hide their relationship until Harry finds out and informs his parents, who disavow Lily by sitting shiva. Lily and Arthur eventually elope and get married.
