= Glow (Donavon Frankenreiter album) =

Studio album by Donavon Frankenreiter
- Released: October 5, 2010
- Recorded: 2010
- Genre: Folk Rock
- Label: Liquid Tambourine Records
- Producer: Mark Weinburg

Glow is the title of Donavon Frankenreiter's fourth album, released on October 5, 2010.

== Track listing ==
1. "Intro" - :38 (Weinburg)
2. "Glow" - 3:21 (Nathanson; Weinburg)
3. "Keeping Me Away From You" - 3:27 (Frankenreiter; Weinburg)
4. "Shadows" - 3:32 (Cockrell; Frankenreiter)
5. "Push" - 3:30 (Koops; Stucchi; Weinburg)
6. "The Ones In Your Dreams" - 2:32 (Frankenreiter)
7. "Home" - 3:01 (Frankenreiter)
8. "Dance Like Nobody's Watching" - 3:42 (Fox; Frankenreiter; Frasier)
9. "Allright" - 3:07 (Frankenreiter; Phillips)
10. "Hold On" - 2:34 (Frankenreiter)
11. Three/Outro - 4:44 (Frankenreiter; Weinburg)

== Personnel ==
- Mark Weinburg - Producer, Composer
- Ryan Williams - Mix Engineer, Recording Engineer
- Gene Grimaldi - Mastering Engineer
- Zack Stucchi - Composer
- Gary Jules - Composer
- Steve Fox - Composer
- Jake Koops - Composer
- Matt Nathanson - Composer
- Grant Lee Phillips - Composer
- Thad Cockrell - Composer
- Stan Frazier - Composer
- Rainman - Programming & Sequencing
- Donavon Frankenreiter - Guitar, Vocals, Composer
- Matt Grundy - Bass, Vocals
- Clay Hawkins - Vocals
- Mozella - Vocals
- Michael Chaves - Guitar
- Aaron Sterling - Drums, Percussion
- Zac Rae - Keyboards, Strings

== Charts ==
| Chart (2010) | Peak position |
|---|---|
| US Top Current Albums (Billboard) | 196 |
| US Folk Albums (Billboard) | 6 |
| US Independent Albums (Billboard) | 38 |
