= Onkaparinga Surf Art Exhibition =

Coordinates: 35°08′57″S 138°28′20″E

The Onkaparinga Surf Art Exhibition is an annual group art exhibition held at The Arts Centre, Port Noarlunga, South Australia. The event celebrates surfing and coastal culture in the state, and launches with a party featuring live music and in some years, screenings of surfing movies. In 2019, the event was held for the 26th time.

== History ==
In 2013, for the 20th edition of the exhibition (then known simply as The Surf), the organizers launched with the setting of a Guinness World Record for longest line of surfboards. The line of boards, arranged on Port Noarlunga Beach, tip-to-tail, spanned 783.5 metres and included 398 boards.

In 2019, the exhibition was curated by Nisa Schebella. The 2019 major prize was awarded to Laura Wills for an illustrated, mixed media work depicting female surfers in the 1920s, including her grandmother.

== Description ==
The exhibition is hosted by the City of Onkaparinga, which appoints a curator and selects works from submissions made by artists working in any medium. Previously exhibited works have included decorated surfboards and handmade swimsuits through to paintings, drawings and sculptures representing surf, surf culture and the marine environment. A major prize of AUD$2000 and a People's Choice prize of AUD$500 are offered. Artists' entries close in early November.
