= Revisited (Donavon Frankenreiter album) =

Studio album by Donavon Frankenreiter
- Released: June 22, 2010
- Recorded: 2010
- Genre: Rock
- Label: Liquid Tambourine Records
- Producer: Donavon Frankenreiter

Revisited is an album by Donavon Frankenreiter, and was released on June 22, 2010. After moving to Hawaii in 2008, Donavon noticed how beautiful the Hawaiian music is and with a friend (Kirk Smart) they headed to the studio in Kauai to revisit his first album. 10 songs were picked to create an album with a different feel.

== Track listing ==
1. "It Don't Matter" - 2:49 (Frankenreiter)
2. "Free" - 3:16 (Frankenreiter; Johnson)
3. "On My Mind" - 3:53 (Frankenreiter)
4. Whatcha Know" - 3:51 (Frankenreiter)
5. "Butterfly" - 3:15 (Frankenreiter)
6. "Bend In The Road" - 2:49 (Frankenreiter)
7. "Call Me Papa" - 3:59 (Frankenreiter)
8. "Heading Home" - 2:49 (Frankenreiter)
9. "So Far Away" - 3:56 (Frankenreiter)
10. Swing On Down" - 3:38 (Frankenreiter)

== Personnel ==
- Ron Pendragon - Mastering Engineer, Mix Engineer
- Jack Johnson - Composer
- Donavon Frankenreiter - Vocals, Guitar, Producer
- Matt Grundy - Bass, Vocals
- Kirk Smart - Guitar
- David Leach - Percussion
