= Live painting =

Form of visual performance art

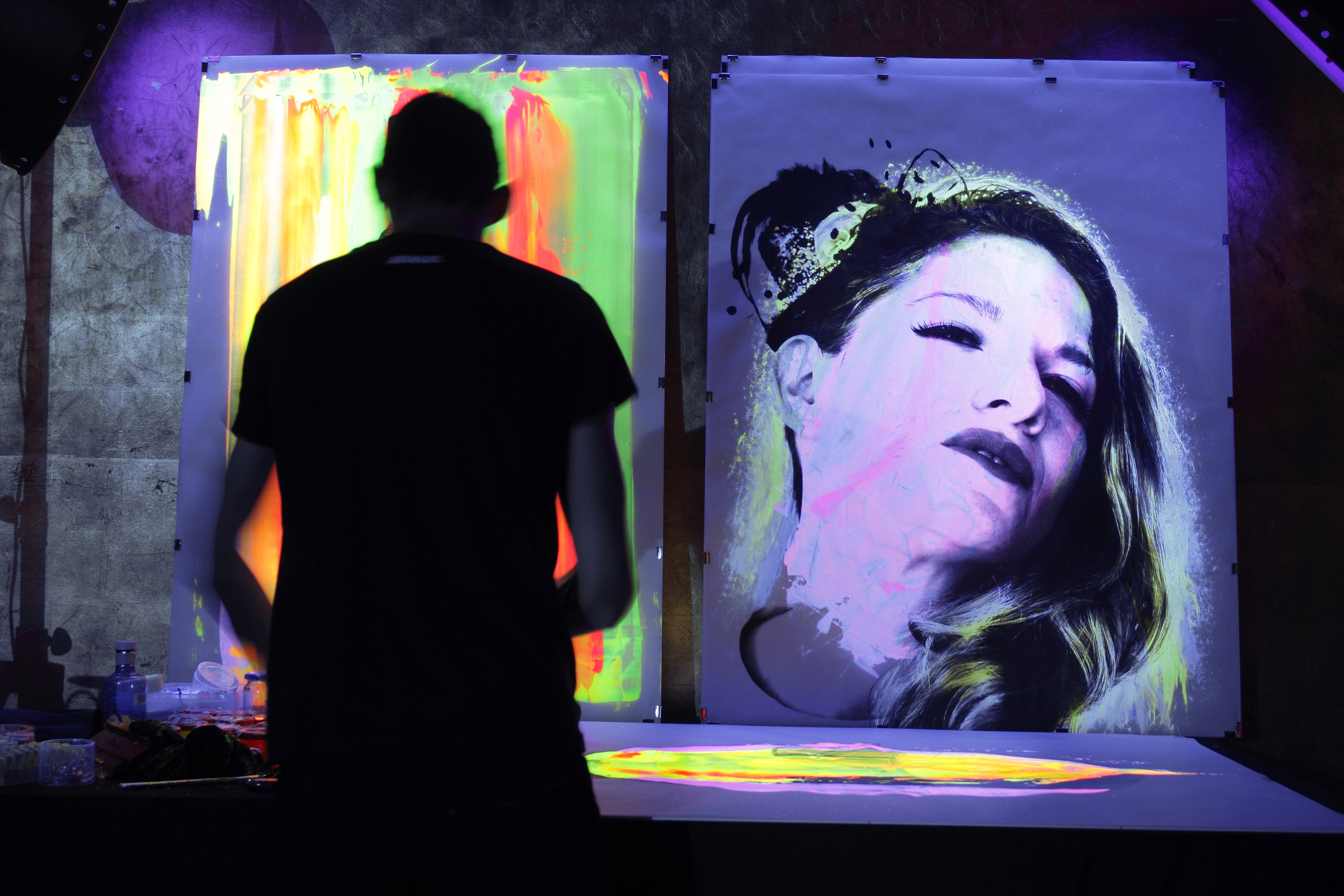
Live painting by Beo Beyond at Shôko Club in Barcelona, working with fluorescent colors which glow under blacklight.

Live painting is a form of visual performance art in which artists complete a visual art piece in a public performance, often at a bar, music concert, wedding reception, or public event, accompanied by a DJ or live music. The artwork which is created live may be planned or improvisational. This live art form is often contrasted with more studied fine art compositions from the same artists, which are generally executed in an artist studio or other private space.

Artists in a number of genres have performed live painting, including LeRoy Neiman creating a painting during the 1976 Summer Olympics. In the 1990s and 2000s, live painting became a hallmark of street art and graffiti artists, also live painting (Dancing Fingers) by Amangpintor.

== Artists ==
One of Australia's famous exponents of live painting performance art, Robert K Gammage, has introduced the physical participation by spectators/hosts and or guests of adding imagery and colour in situ in the public domain during the event.

Caitlin Beidler, an American artist of Redemption Art, uses her live paintings to restore people, relationships, and communities through art. Redemption Art aims to be an effective tool in the restoration process by first creating trusting relationships through art, regardless of race, age, culture, or socioeconomic status. From these relationships, Redemption Art seeks to help bring about restoration and then transformation.

The live artist teams from Haven Art Studio collaborate on works of art during performances. These teams were started in 2005 by the eight members of the Randolph family, based in Redding, California. They paint thematic works that echo world events with a positive redemption message.
