= SurfAid International =

Charitable organization in Indonesia

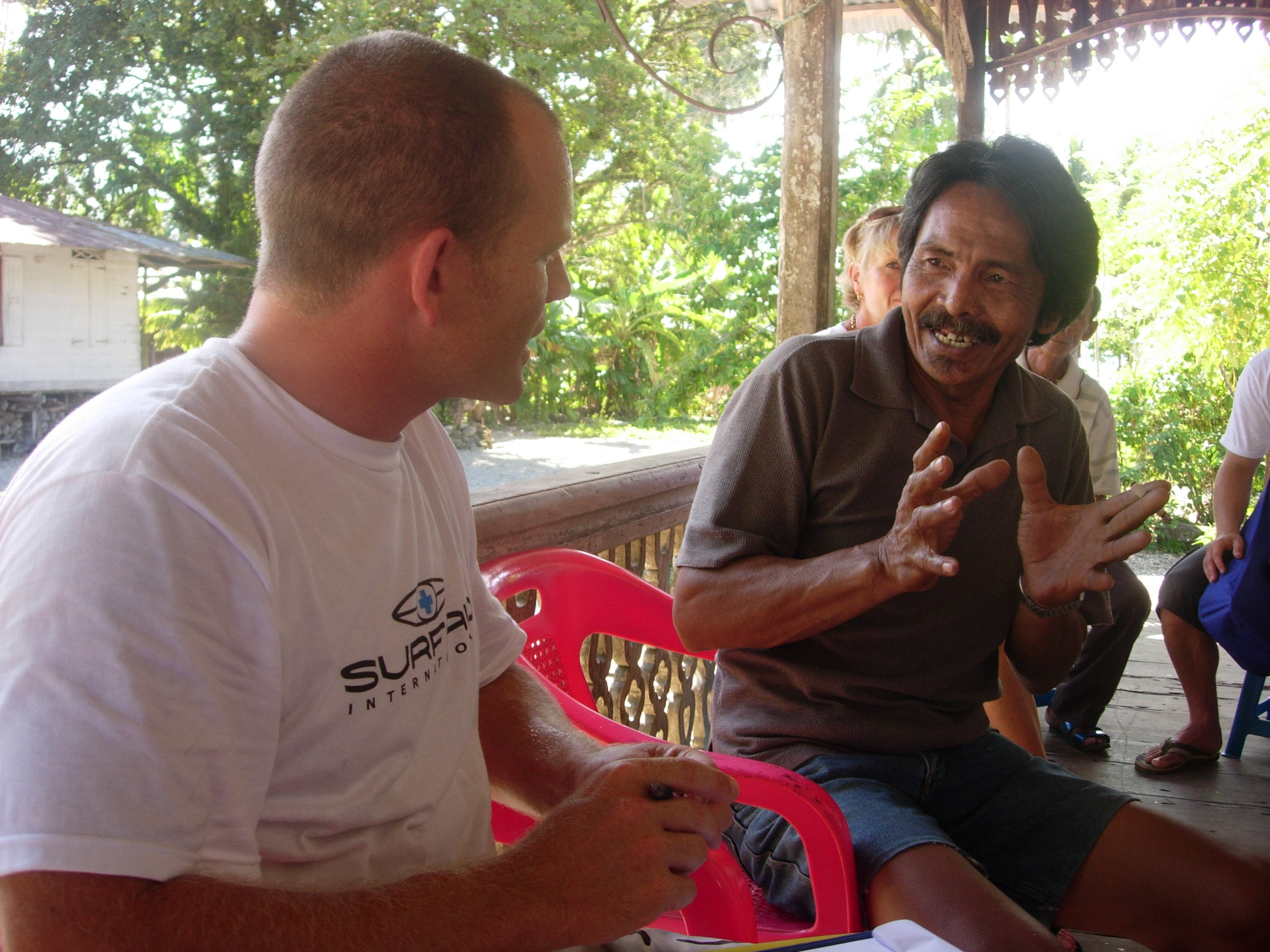
- Dr Ben Gordon from SurfAid conducting health checks on the Hinako Islands after the 2004 tsunami.
- Formation: 2000; 26 years ago
- Founder: Dr. Dave Jenkins
- Type: Charitable organization
- Headquarters: Medan, North Sumatra, Indonesia
- Region served: International
- Website: surfaid.org

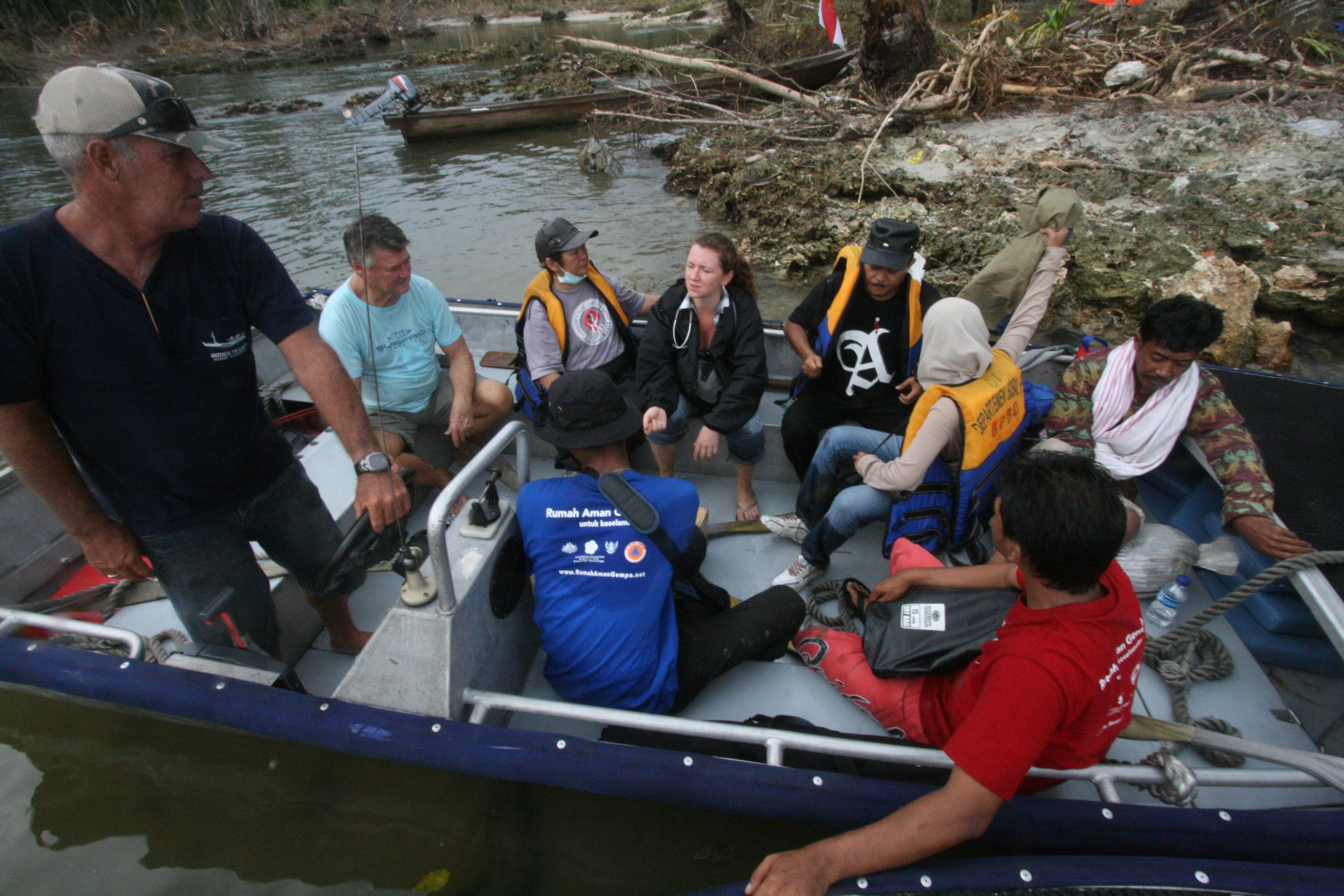
SurfAid volunteers evacuating an injured man during the 2010 Mentawai earthquake and tsunami

SurfAid International (often called just SurfAid) is an international charitable organization working in the Mentawai Islands of Indonesia. It was founded by Dr. Dave Jenkins of New Zealand in 2000. In 1999 he was on a surfing trip in the area and saw the health problems of the local people. SurfAid's early efforts were focused on providing health education to the people and mosquito nets to prevent the spread of malaria.

SurfAid came to international attention after the 2004 Indian Ocean earthquake when it provided medical aid to its victims. It was able to reach people on small islands, who were among the hardest hit, because it used small boats and its people were familiar with the area. SurfAid received financial aid from the governments of Australia and New Zealand and from individual and corporate donors. Its main office is in Bali, Indonesia and it has branch offices in the United States, New Zealand and Australia.

In 2007 SurfAid announced a multi-year project to control malaria throughout the Mentawai Islands in cooperation with the Indonesian government and UNICEF. In 2009 SurfAid was expanding its work into the nearby Nias Islands, had received several international awards, and was receiving donations of about $3 million per year from private and corporate donors, most involved in the sport of surfing.
