= USBands =

Music organizations based in the United States

- Type: Public
- Founded: 1988
- Headquarters: Allentown, Pennsylvania, U.S
- Parent: Independent (1988–1990); YEA (1990–2019); BD Performing Arts (2020–present)

USBands, formally United States Scholastic Band Association and sometimes referred to as USSBA, was formed in the Fall 1988 to provide high school marching bands an opportunity to compete in a circuit featuring top judges from across the continent. USBands is based in Concord, CA and is a programming offering of BD Performing Arts.

USBands includes over 700 participating high school marching bands. Bands are offered over 200 opportunities per year including competitions and clinics.

In competitions, bands are classified by size and compete with bands within their classification. The classes include range from Group 1, the smallest, to Group 5, the largest. Bands are also classified by skill level. The skill classifications include the Regional A Class for inexperienced bands, A Class for bands that have recently moved to a larger size group and the Open class for established programs. In total, there are 15 classifications ranging from Group I Regional A to Group V Open, who perform and compete with bands of similar size and talent.

USBands has also begun supporting competitive indoor events, and provides cooperative fundraising opportunities. In the winter of 2012, USSBA changed their name to USBands.

== Classifications ==
USBands allows their bands to classify themselves into three groups:

- Open Class: Seasoned ensembles that demonstrate expanded skill sets and are adjudicated on a scale supporting intermediate to advanced skills.
- A Class: Ensembles who demonstrate a fundamental to intermediate skill set and are adjudicated on a scale representing fundamental to intermediate skills.
- Regional A Class: Ensembles who demonstrate a basic to fundamental skill set (may be building/rebuilding their program) and are adjudicated on a scale representing basic to fundamental skills.
- Performance Class: Ensembles may choose not to compete, while participating in a substantive experience and engaging evaluation platform, at any USBands-sanctioned event. Ensembles in this classification receive evaluation based on the points of comparison found on the A Class sheets and commentary by adjudicators and will be awarded ratings of Superior, Outstanding, Excellent, Good, or Fair. The rating will be announced at the awards ceremony. No scores will be given.

== Group size ==
=== 2016 to 2019 ===
Between 2016 and 2019, groups were classified by the following size, which includes playing members, auxiliary, and command personnel drum majors, and bands from Texas had group sizes that varied from the national ranges:

- Group I - 1 to 38 members (Texas: 1-45)
- Group II - 39 to 53 members (Texas: 46–80)
- Group III - 54 to 70 members (Texas: 81–115)
- Group IV - 71 to 95 members (Texas: 116–160)
- Group V - 96 to 130 members (Texas: 161–200)
- Group VI -131 and more members (Texas: 201+)

=== 2020 ===
For 2020, USBands created an additional sizing and eliminated the "Open Class" as part of its "v-USBands" virtual adjudication platform. Individual musicians, guard performers, small ensembles, and group Sizes for marching bands were classified as:

- Division I - 26 to 50 members
- Division II - 51 to 74 members
- Division III - 75 to 99 members
- Division IV - 100 and more members
- Bands with fewer than 26 members were permitted to be included in Division I or as an Ensemble.

=== 2021 ===
For 2021, USBands restored its Open Class for all competitions in Texas and for all national competitions, effective September 25. Group sizes changed to:

- Group I - 1 to 39 members (Texas: 1-59)
- Group II - 40 to 59 members (Texas: 60–99)
- Group III - 60 to 79 members (Texas: 100–139)
- Group IV - 80 to 100 members (Texas: 140–169)
- Group V - 101 or more members (Texas: 170+)

Group VI has been eliminated

=== 2022 ===
For 2022, group sizes again changed with Texas events remaining the same as 2021:

- Group I - 1 to 39 members (Texas: 1-59)
- Group II - 40 to 54 members (Texas: 60–99)
- Group III - 55 to 74 members (Texas: 100–139)
- Group IV - 75 to 99 members (Texas: 140–169)
- Group V - 100 or more members (Texas: 170+)

=== 2023 ===
For 2023, group sizes have been changed as follows (Texas events group sizing remains the same as 2021).

- Group I - 1 to 35 members (Texas: 1-59)
- Group II - 36 to 49 members (Texas: 60–99)
- Group III - 50 to 64 members (Texas: 100–139)
- Group IV - 65 to 89 members (Texas: 140–169)
- Group V - 90 or more members (Texas: 170+)

=== 2024 ===
For 2024, Texas group sizes changed slightly as follows (National events group sizing remains the same as 2023).

- Group I - 1 to 35 members (Texas: 1-59)
- Group II - 36 to 49 members (Texas: 60–99)
- Group III - 50 to 64 members (Texas: 100–139)
- Group IV - 65 to 89 members (Texas: 140–170)
- Group V - 90 or more members (Texas: 171+)

=== 2025 ===
For 2025, group sizes changed for both National and Texas events

- Group I - 1 to 39 members (Texas: 1-69)
- Group II - 40 to 59 members (Texas: 70–99)
- Group III - 60 to 74 members (Texas: 100–129)
- Group IV - 75 to 99 members (Texas: 130–169)
- Group V - 100 or more members (Texas: 170+)

=== 2026 ===
For 2026, National group sizes were restructured with different group sizes in Group Regional A & A and Open Class (Texas group sizing remains the same as 2025).

- Group I Regional A/Group I A - 1 to 39 members
- Group II Regional A/Group II A - 35 to 44 members
- Group III Regional A/Group III A - 45 to 59 members
- Group IV Regional A/Group IV A - 60 to 89 members
- Group V Regional A/Group V A - 90 or more members
- Group I Open - 1 to 44 members (Texas: 1-69)
- Group II Open - 45 to 64 members (Texas: 70-99)
- Group III Open - 65 to 84 members (Texas: 100-129)
- Group IV Open - 85 to 100 members (Texas: 130-169)
- Group V Open - 101 or more members (Texas: 170+)

== Past USBands Open Class champions ==
Year	Group I-Open	Group II-Open	Group III-Open	Group IV-Open	Group V-Open	Group VI-Open
2026	Wayne Valley HS (Wayne, NJ) 91.650	King Philip Regional HS (Wrentham, MA); 92.125	Spring-Ford Area HS (Royersford, PA); 94.250	C.G. Conn Division: West Milford HS (West Milford, NJ); 93.700 Selmer Division: Edison HS (Edison, NJ); 94.000	Norwalk HS (Norwalk, CT); 97.200	Class Inactive
2025	Old Bridge HS (Matawan, NJ) 93.800	King Philip Regional HS (Wrentham, MA); 96.050	Perkiomen Valley HS (Collegeville, PA) 96.300	C.G. Conn Division: West Milford HS (West Milford, NJ); 96.250 Selmer Division: Upper Moreland HS (Willows Grove, PA); 97.600	Norwalk HS (Norwalk, CT); 97.500	Class Inactive
2024	East Haven HS Co-op Marching Band (East Haven, Connecticut) 91.400	Calvert Hall College High School (Baltimore, Maryland) 96.900	King Philip Regional High School (Wrentham, Massachusetts) 95.900	Dartmouth High School (Dartmouth, Massachusetts) 97.650	Upper Moreland Senior High School (Willow Grove, Pennsylvania) 98.100	Class Inactive
2023	West Perry HS Marching Band (Elliottsburg, Pennsylvania) 87.550	Delran HS (Delran, NJ) 92.300	Perkiomen Valley HS (Collegeville, Pennsylvania) 94.950	Loudoun County HS (Leesburg, Virginia) 96.800	Dartmouth High School (Dartmouth, Massachusetts) 98.050	Class Inactive
2022	Lenape Regional HS (Medford, New Jersey) 90.35	Allentown HS (Allentown, New Jersey) 93.25	Council Rock High School South (Southampton, Pennsylvania) 93.75	Edison High School (Edison, New Jersey) 96.5	Dartmouth High School (Dartmouth, Massachusetts) 97.7	Class Inactive
2021	Glen Ridge HS (Glen Ridge, New Jersey) 90.1	Passaic HS (Passaic, New Jersey) 94.9	Blackstone-Millville HS (Blackstone, Massachusetts) 94.6	North Penn HS (Lansdale, Pennsylvania) 95.20	Dartmouth HS (Dartmouth, Massachusetts) 98.00	Class Inactive
2020	Shepherd Hill Reg HS (Dudley, Massachusetts) 92.0	Edison HS (Edison, New Jersey) 94.67				
2019	Burlington City HS (Burlington, New Jersey) 92.45	Shepherd Hill Reg HS (Dudley, Massachusetts) 95.9	Calvert Hall College HS (Baltimore, Maryland) 95.425	Blackstone-Millville HS (Blackstone, Massachusetts) 98.325	Dartmouth HS (Dartmouth, Massachusetts) 98.575	Norwalk HS (Norwalk, Connecticut) 96.050
2018	Burlington City HS (Burlington, New Jersey) 94.463	Shepherd Hill Reg HS (Dudley, Massachusetts) 95.288	Calvert Hall College HS (Baltimore, Maryland) 93.750	Edison HS (Edison, New Jersey) 97.588	Dartmouth HS (Dartmouth, Massachusetts) 98.075	Norwalk HS (Norwalk, Connecticut) 95.600
2017	Burlington City HS (Burlington, New Jersey) 95.425	Shepherd Hill Reg HS (Dudley, Massachusetts) 96.400	Calvert Hall College HS (Baltimore, Maryland) 96.588	Newtown HS (Newtown, Connecticut) 97.363	Dartmouth HS (Dartmouth, Massachusetts) 98.350	Norwalk HS (Norwalk, Connecticut) 97.775
2016	Joseph Case HS (Swansea, Massachusetts) 96.475	Calvert Hall College HS (Baltimore, Maryland) 96.875	King Philip Regional HS (Wrentham, Massachusetts) 97.438	Blackstone-Millville HS (Blackstone, Massachusetts) 97.425	Dartmouth HS (Dartmouth, Massachusetts) 97.063	Trumbull HS (Trumbull, Connecticut) 97.100
2015	East Stroudsburg HS North (Dingmans Ferry, Pennsylvania) 95.538	Shepherd Hill Reg HS (Dudley, Massachusetts) 96.100	King Philip Regional HS (Wrentham, Massachusetts) 95.788	Blackstone-Millville HS (Blackstone, Massachusetts) 96.963	Mechanicsburg HS (Mechanicsburg, Pennsylvania) 97.363	Norwin HS (Irwin, Pennsylvania) 97.200
2014	Haddon Heights HS (Haddon Heights, New Jersey) 94.450	Lenape Regional HS (Medford, New Jersey) 96.425	Edison HS (Edison, New Jersey) 98.300	Nazareth Area HS (Nazareth, Pennsylvania) 97.975	North Penn HS (Lansdale, Pennsylvania) 97.95	Norwalk HS (Norwalk, Connecticut) 97.375
2013	Haddon Heights HS (Haddon Heights, New Jersey) 90.25	Edison HS (Edison, New Jersey) 95.738	King Philip Regional HS (Wrentham, Massachusetts) 96.138	Smithfield-Selma HS (Smithfield, North Carolina) 96.875	Dartmouth HS (Dartmouth, Massachusetts) 96.6	West Genesee HS (Camillus, New York) 95.687
2012	Cedar Cliff HS (Camp Hill, Pennsylvania) 92.288	Susquehanna Twp HS (Harrisburg, Pennsylvania) 96.8	Old Bridge HS (Old Bridge Township, New Jersey) 96.375	King Philip Regional HS (Wrentham, Massachusetts) 97.075	Immaculata HS (Somerville, New Jersey) 96.587	Wagner HS (San Antonio, Texas) 97.288
2011	Monsignor Farrell HS (Staten Island, New York) 93.650	Frank W. Cox HS (Virginia Beach, Virginia) 95.7	Montville Twp (Montville, New Jersey) 97.588	North Penn HS (Lansdale, Pennsylvania) 96.938	Dartmouth HS (Dartmouth, Massachusetts) 98.225	Munford HS (Munford, Tennessee) 98.013
2010	Perkiomen Valley HS (Collegeville, Pennsylvania) 96.063	Williamstown HS (Williamstown, New Jersey) 97.06	Rancocas Valley Reg HS (Mount Holly, New Jersey) 97.875	Nazareth Area HS (Nazareth, Pennsylvania) 97.400	Dartmouth HS (Dartmouth, Massachusetts) 98.55	George Walton HS (Marietta, Georgia) 97.650
2009	Perkiomen Valley HS (Collegeville, Pennsylvania) 97.35	Timber Creek Reg HS (Sicklerville, New Jersey) 97.163	Rancocas Valley Reg HS (Mount Holly, New Jersey) 97.2	King Philip Regional HS (Wrentham, Massachusetts) 97.45	Dartmouth HS (Dartmouth, Massachusetts) 97.813	Roxbury HS (Roxbury, New Jersey) 98.188
2008	Biglerville HS (Biglerville, Pennsylvania) 93.92	River Hill HS (Clarksville, Maryland) 98.25	Cedar Cliff HS (Camp Hill, Pennsylvania) 96.9	Nazareth Area HS (Nazareth, Pennsylvania) 98.575	Dartmouth HS (Dartmouth, Massachusetts) 98.275	Immaculata HS (Somerville, New Jersey) 96.05
2007	Deptford Township HS (Deptford Township, New Jersey) 93.35	Century HS (Sykesville, Maryland) 96.3	River Hill HS (Clarksville, Maryland) 95.55	Nazareth Area HS (Nazareth, Pennsylvania) 97.5	Upper Darby HS (Upper Darby, Pennsylvania) 96.425	
2006	Fluvanna County HS (Palmyra, Virginia) 94.675	Shawnee HS (Medford, New Jersey) 94.675	Waterford HS (Waterford, Connecticut) 95.85	Absegami HS (Galloway Township, New Jersey) 96.9	Cheshire HS (Cheshire, Connecticut) 95.8	North Penn HS (Lansdale, Pennsylvania) 98.475
2005	Shawnee HS (Medford, New Jersey)	Cheshire HS (Cheshire, Connecticut) 97.15	North Penn HS (Lansdale, Pennsylvania) 97.150			
2004	Nazareth Area HS (Nazareth, Pennsylvania)	McLean HS (McLean, Virginia) 92.85	North Penn HS (Lansdale, Pennsylvania) 97.40			
2003	Point Pleasant Borough HS (Point Pleasant, New Jersey)	Nazareth Area HS (Nazareth, Pennsylvania) 98.0				
2002	Point Pleasant Borough HS (Point Pleasant, New Jersey)	Union HS (Union, New Jersey) 95.700	Nazareth Area HS (Nazareth, Pennsylvania) 96.4	Cheshire HS (Cheshire, Connecticut) 97.9		
2001	Point Pleasant Borough HS (Point Pleasant, New Jersey)	Upper Moreland HS (Willow Grove, Pennsylvania) 95.200	North Penn HS (Lansdale, Pennsylvania) 96.20			
2000	Point Pleasant Borough HS (Point Pleasant, New Jersey)	Nazareth Area HS (Nazareth, Pennsylvania) 96.300	McLean HS (McLean, Virginia) 95.600	North Penn HS (Lansdale, Pennsylvania) 97.500		
1999	Brick Memorial HS (Brick Township, New Jersey) 93.60	King Philip Regional HS (Wrentham, Massachusetts) 96.900	Cheshire HS (Cheshire, Connecticut) 95.000	North Penn HS (Lansdale, Pennsylvania) 96.900		
1998	Glen Ridge HS (Glen Ridge, NJ); 92.70	South Hadley HS (South Hadley, MA); 93.10	King Philip Regional HS (Wrentham, MA); 97.400		North Penn HS (Lansdale, PA); 95.50	
1997	Glen Ridge HS (Glen Ridge, NJ); 92.60	Gov Livingston HS (Berkeley Heights, NJ) and Waterford HS (Waterford, CT) 90.90	Nazareth Area HS (Nazareth, PA); 95.50	Immaculata HS (Somerville, NJ); 95.10	North Penn HS (Lansdale, PA); 97.20	
1996	Dunellen HS (Dunellen, NJ); 86.700	Central Regional HS (Bayville, NJ); 91.00	Brick Memorial HS (Brick Twp, NJ); 93.80	King Philip Regional HS (Wrentham, MA); 93.30	Piscataway HS (Piscataway Twp, NJ); 95.90	
1995	King Philip Regional HS (Wrentham, Massachusetts)	North Penn HS (Lansdale, Pennsylvania) 95.800				
1994	Morris Knolls HS (Denville, New Jersey)	Piscataway HS (Piscataway, New Jersey)				
1993		Piscataway HS (Piscataway, New Jersey)				
1992	South Brunswick HS (Monmouth Junction, NJ); 91.70	Brick Memorial HS (Brick Twp, NJ); 93.45	Ridgewood HS (Ridgewood, NJ); 93.40	Immaculata HS (Somerville, NJ); 90.50	Piscataway HS (Piscataway, New Jersey); 95.30	
1991	Gov Livingston HS (Berkeley Heights, NJ)	Lindenhurst HS (Lindenhurst, NY); 91.40	Jackson Memorial HS (Jackson Twp, NJ); 94.05	Stroudsburg Area HS (Stroudsburg, PA); 93.20	Piscataway HS (Piscataway, New Jersey); 97.10	
1990	Glen Ridge HS (Glen Ridge, NJ); 93.00	Upper Dublin HS (Fort Washington, PA); 91.80	Immaculata HS (Somerville, NJ); 94.85	Elizabeth HS (Elizabeth, NJ); 94.55	Piscataway HS (Piscataway, New Jersey); 97.40	
1989				Immaculata HS (Somerville, NJ); 88.25	North Penn HS (Lansdale, Pennsylvania); 86.10	
1988				Immaculata HS (Somerville, NJ)	Piscataway HS (Piscataway, New Jersey)	

== Past USBands A Class champions ==
Year	Group I-A	Group II-A	Group III-A	Group IV-A	Group V-A	Group VI-A
2026	Northern HS (Owings, MD); 91.550	Ridley HS (Folsom, PA); 93.000	Sparta HS (Sparta, NJ); 92.700	Council Rock North HS (Newtown, PA); 95.350	New Providence HS (New Providence, NJ); 92.350	Class Inactive
2025	Group IA: Halifax Area HS (Halifax, PA); 90.000 Group IAA: Northern HS (Owings, MD); 91.000	Council Rock North HS (Newtown, PA); 93.700	Marple Newtown HS (Newtown Square, PA); 93.000	Kingsway Reg HS (Woolwich Twp, NJ); 93.600	Upper Darby HS (Drexel Hill, PA); 92.000	Class Inactive
2024	B.M.C. Durfee HS (Fall River, MA); 96.000	Group IIA: Immaculata HS (Somerville, NJ); 95.800 Group IIAA: Hackettstown HS (Hackettstown, NJ); 93.600	Nutley HS (Nutley, NJ); 96.100	Ridgewood HS (Ridgewood, NJ); 94.300	Marriotts Ridge HS (Marriottsville, MD); 94.900	Class Inactive
2023	Mainland Regional HS (Linwood, NJ); 94.40	Group IIA: Central Dauphin East HS (Harrisburg, PA); 92.700 Group IIAA: Bethel HS (Bethel, CT); 94.0	Parkside HS (Salisbury, MD); 95.4	Tenafly HS (Tenafly, NJ); 94.9	Fort Lee HS (Fort Lee, NJ); 95.4	Class Inactive
2022	Group IA: East Haven HS Co-op (East Haven, CT); 95.80 Group IAA: Northern HS (Owings, MD); 94.60	Group IIA: Northern Valley HS at Old Tappan (Old Tappan, NJ); 95.50 Group IIAA: Lenape Valley Reg HS (Stanhope, NJ); 96.70	Nutley HS (Nutley, NJ); 93.60	Pequannock Twp HS (Pompton Plains, NJ); 95.50	New Providence HS (New Providence, NJ); 95.00	Class Inactive
2021	Delran HS (Delran Township, NJ); 96.200	Allentown HS (Allentown, NJ); 93.900	West Milford HS (West Milford, NJ); 94.800	Loudoun County HS (Leesburg, VA); 96.300	Port Chester HS (Port Chester, NY); 89.800	Class Inactive
2020	No Championships Held Due to COVID-19					
2019	Calvert HS (Prince Frederick, MD); 92.705	East Haven HS Co-op (East Haven, CT); 95.940	Pequannock Twp HS (Pompton Plains, NJ); 93.860	Council Rock HS-South (Holland, PA); 94.350	Loudoun County HS (Leesburg, VA); 98.400	New Providence HS (New Providence, NJ); 94.340
2018	Somerset-Berkley HS (Somerset, MA); 94.400	Montville Township HS (Montville, NJ); 94.438	Thomas S Wootton HS (Rockville, MD); 97.275	Loudoun County HS (Leesburg, VA); 97.512	West Milford HS (West Milford, NJ); 93.650	New Providence HS (New Providence, NJ); 94.263
2017	Weehawken HS (Weehawken, NJ); 92.113	Lenape Valley Reg HS (Stanhope, NJ); 93.313	Pequannock Twp HS (Pompton Plains, NJ); 95.088	South County HS (Lorton, VA); 97.563	Cicero-North Syracuse HS (Cicero, NY); 94.625	Jackson Memorial HS (Jackson Twp, NJ); 92.375
2016	Delran HS (Delran Twp, NJ); 96.763	Bethel HS (Bethel, CT); 96.813	Audubon HS (Audubon, NJ); 96.013	Council Rock HS-South (Holland, PA); 96.175	West Orange HS (West Orange, NJ); 96.638	New Providence HS (New Providence, NJ); 95.838
2015	Somerset Berkley Reg HS (Somerset, MA); 97.425	Kingsway Reg HS (Woolwich Twp, NJ); 97.100	Montville Twp HS (Montville, NJ); 96.663	Parsippany HS (Parsippany, NJ); 96.638	Westfield HS (Westfield, NJ); 96.738	New Providence HS (New Providence, NJ); 96.950
2014	Joseph Case HS (Swansea, MA); 96.6	Wayne Valley HS (Wayne, NJ); 93.663	Union HS (Union Twp, NJ); 91.213	Northern Highlands Reg HS (Allendale, NJ); 97.400	Cherokee HS (Evesham Twp, NJ); 92.188	Scotch Plains-Fanwood HS (Scotch Plains, NJ); 92.875
2013	Weehawken HS (Weehawken, NJ); 96.163	Monroe Twp HS (Monroe Twp, NJ); 95.613	North Warren Reg HS (Blairstown, NJ); 96.425	Group IV-A: Northern Highlands Reg HS (Allendale, NJ); 91.938 Group IV-AA: Absegami HS (Galloway Twp, NJ); 95.163	Elizabeth HS (Elizabeth, NJ); 95.987	Jackson Memorial HS (Jackson Twp, NJ); 96.300
2012	Joseph Case HS (Swansea, MA); 94.975	Chopticon HS (Morganza, MD); 97.088	Northern Highlands Reg HS (Allendale, NJ); 96.125	Passaic HS (Passaic, NJ); 96.263	Elizabeth HS (Elizabeth, NJ); 97.100	New Providence HS (New Providence, NJ); 96.300
2011	Joseph Case HS (Swansea, MA); 94.163	Lenape Regional HS (Medford, NJ); 96.413	Perkiomen Valley HS (Collegeville, PA); 96.588	Madison County HS (Danielsville, GA); 95.35	Elizabeth HS (Elizabeth, NJ); 97.413	New Providence HS (New Providence, NJ); 96.438
2010	Joseph Case HS (Swansea, MA)				West Milford HS (West Milford, NJ); 92.588	New Providence HS (New Providence, NJ); 91.350
2009	Joseph Case HS (Swansea, MA); 93.250	Allentown HS (Allentown, NJ); 91.625	Burlington City HS (Burlington, NJ); 93.975	Mount Olive HS (Flanders, NJ); 94.450	West Milford HS (West Milford, NJ); 94.125	Fort Lee HS (Fort Lee, NJ); 86.750
2008	Mainland Regional HS (Linwood, NJ); 90.100	Parsippany HS (Parsippany, NJ); 90.800	Allentown HS (Allentown, NJ); 90.900	South County HS (Lorton, VA); 95.450		
2007	Lenape Regional HS (Medford, NJ)					
2005	Elizabeth HS (Elizabeth, NJ)	Group IIA: Passaic High School (Passaic, NJ) Group IIAA: Park Ridge HS (Park Ridge, NJ)				
2004	Lenape Regional HS (Medford, NJ)	Passaic High School (Passaic, NJ)				
2003	Lenape Valley Reg HS (Stanhope, NJ); 90.40	Elizabeth HS (Elizabeth, NJ)				
2002	Blue Mountain HS (Schuylkill Haven, PA); 87.40		Copiague HS (Copiague, NY); 92.70			
2001	Northampton Area HS (Northampton, PA); 86.70	Governor Mifflin HS (Shillington, PA); 88.60	Blackstone-Millville HS (Blackstone, MA); 94.60			
2000	Kearny HS (Kearny, NJ)	Blackstone-Millville HS (Blackstone, MA); 89.30	Pennsbury HS (Fairless Hills, PA); 95.50			
1999	Lakewood HS (Lakewood Twp, NJ); 90.95	Perkiomen Valley HS (Collegeville, PA); 90.70	Group IIIA Morris Knolls HS (Denville, NJ) Group IIIA; Kearny HS (Kearny, NJ)	Somerville HS (Somerville, NJ); 90.15		
1998	Maroon Division; Oakcrest HS (Mays Landing, NJ); 89.80 Silver Division; Point Pleasant Boro HS (Point Pleasant, NJ); 88.40 Gold Division; Bernards HS (Bernardsville, NJ); 88.30	Maroon Division; Abington HS (Abington Twp, PA); 90.20 Bronze Division; Brick Twp HS (Brick Twp, NJ); 90.20 Silver Division Gold Division; Oceanside HS (Oceanside, NY); 91.10	Maroon Division; Copiague HS (Copiague, NY); 89.90 Silver Division Gold Division; Atholton HS (Columbia, MD); 90.80	Maroon Division; Cheshire HS (Cheshire, CT); 93.70 Silver Division; Sachem HS (Farmingville, NY); 90.00	Southington HS (Southington, CT); 90.30	
1997	Maroon Division; River Dell HS (Oradell, NJ); 81.80 Silver Division; Morristown HS (Morristown, NJ); 88.50 Gold Division; Northern Burlington Reg HS (Mansfield Twp, NJ); 84.10	Maroon Division; Wicomico HS (Sailsbury, MD); 89.00 Bronze Division; Morris Hills HS (Rockaway, NJ); 89.60 Gold Division; Parsippany Hills HS (Morris Plains, NJ); 84.10	Maroon Division; Middletown HS North (Middletown Twp, NJ); 90.40 Silver Division; West Windsor-Plainsboro HS (West Windsor, NJ); 90.70	Maroon Division; John P Stevens HS (Edison, NJ); 91.80 Silver Division; Ridgewood HS (Ridgewood, NJ); 90.80	Cumberland Valley HS (Mechanicsburg, PA) & Port Chester HS (Port Chester, NY); 91.70	
1996	Maroon Division; Westfield HS(Westfield, NJ); 82.30 A Division; Lakewood HS (Lakewood Twp, NJ); 87.70 Gold Division; North Rockland HS (Thiells, NY); 83.30	Maroon Division; Parsippany HS (Parsippany, NJ); 86.30 Silver Division; Sayreville HS (Sayreville, NJ); 83.40 A Division; South Hadley HS (South Hadley, MA); 85.50 Gold Division; Burlington City HS (Burlington, NJ); 86.00	Silver Division; Middletown HS North (Middletown Twp, NJ); 85.00 A Division; South Western HS (Hanover, PA); 91.30	Maroon Division; Copiague HS (Copiague, NY); 88.30 Gold Division; South Brunswick HS (Monmouth Junction, NJ); 92.60	Port Chester HS (Port Chester, NY); 92.00	
1992	Lenape Valley Reg HS (Stanhope, NJ); 80.25	Mahopac HS (Mahopac, NY); 86.90	East Ramapo HS (Spring Valley, NY); 83.05			
1991	Bernards HS (Bernardsville, NJ); 85.70	Wilson HS (West Lawn, PA); 89.50	Middletown HS North (Middletown Twp, NJ); 87.15			
1990	Parsippany HS (Parsippany, NJ); 90.10	Westfield HS (Westfield, NJ); 83.75	Middletown HS North (Middletown Twp, NJ); 83.45			

== Past USBands Regional A Class Champions ==
Year	Group I Regional A	Group II Regional A	Group III Regional A	Group IV Regional A	Group V Regional A
2026	North Warren Regional HS (Blairstown, NJ); 91.700	Park Ridge HS (Park Ridge, NJ); 91.750	No Champion	No Champion	No Champion
2025	North Warren Regional HS (Blairstown, NJ); 92.000	No Champion	No Champion	No Champion	No Champion
