= Blue Raiders =

Blue Raider may refer to:

- Middle Tennessee State University, mascot: Blue Raider
- Lindsey Wilson College, mascot: Blue Raider
- Somerset Berkley Regional High School (Somerset, Massachusetts), mascot: Blue Raider
