= Brayton Homestead =

Historic house in Massachusetts, United States

- U.S. National Register of Historic Places
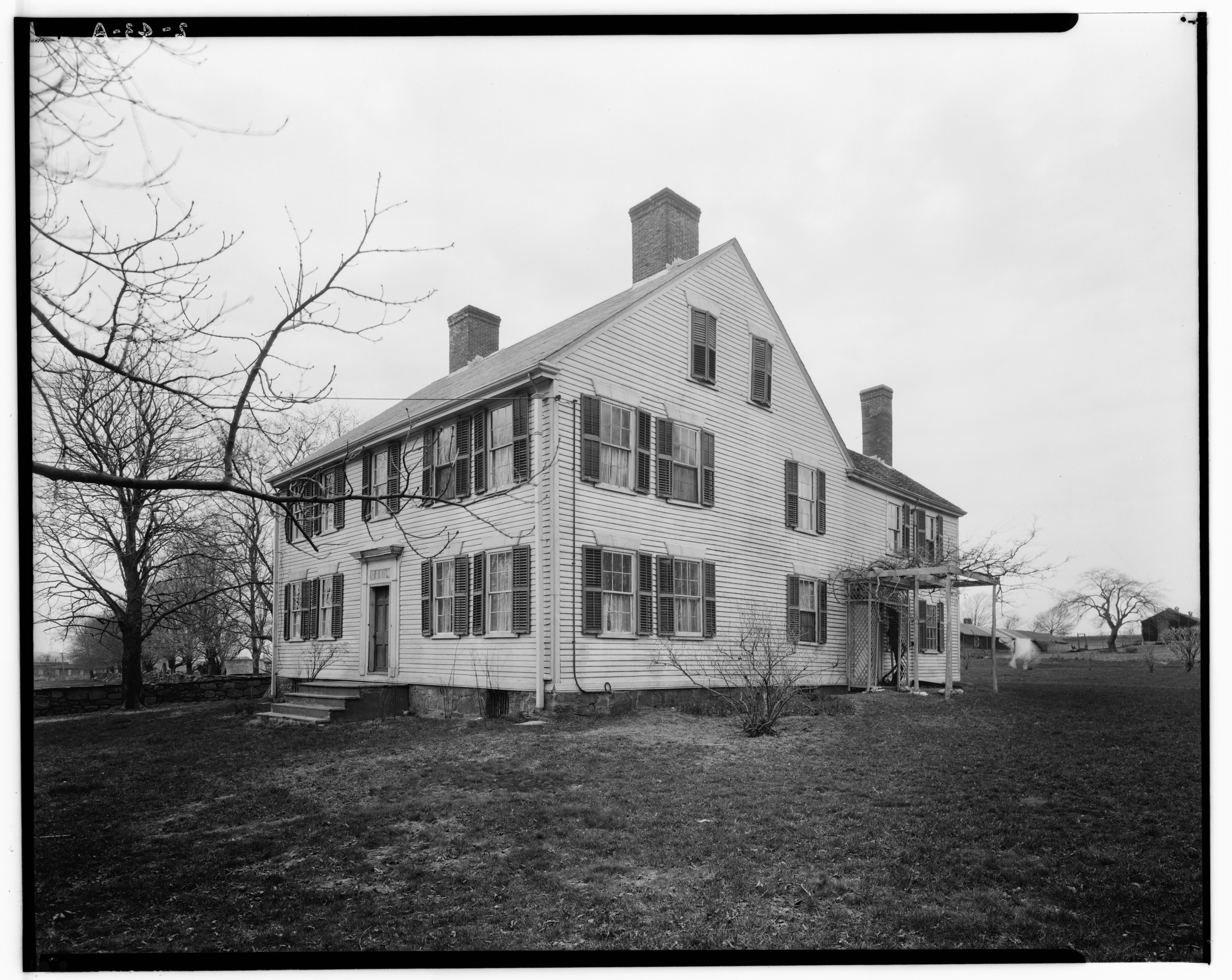
- 1934 HABS photo

- Location within Massachusetts Location within the United States
- Location: 159 Brayton Ave., Somerset, Massachusetts
- Coordinates: 41°43′30″N 71°09′38″W
- Area: 0.41 acres (0.17 ha)
- Built: c. 1796
- Built by: John Brayton
- Architectural style: Georgian, Federal
- NRHP reference No.: 100005077
- Added to NRHP: May 25, 2020

The Brayton Homestead is a historic house at 159 Brayton Avenue in Somerset, Massachusetts. Built about 1796, it is one of Somerset's oldest surviving houses, and a rare local example of Georgian/Federal residential architecture. It was built by John Brayton on land purchased by his grandfather, and remained in the family into the 20th century. The house was listed on the National Register of Historic Places in 2020.

== Description and history ==
The Brayton Homestead stands in the village of South Somerset, on the west side of Brayton Avenue south of its junction with McArthur Avenue. It is a 2 1/2-story wood-frame structure, five bays wide, with a side-gable roof and clapboarded exterior. The roof is pierced by symmetrically placed brick chimneys. The main facade is also symmetrical, with sash windows arranged around the central entrance. The entrance is flanked by fluted pilasters and topped by a five-light transom window, entablature, and cornice. A two-story ell extends to the rear. The interior retains many original mid-to-late 19th century features, including wall paneling and central staircase.

The house sits in a very small parcel of land, a surviving remnant of more than 130 acres (53 ha) purchased by Preserved Brayton in the 1710s, when the area was part of Swansea. This house was built by his grandson John around 1796, a few years after he inherited the property following the death of his father Israel. The Braytons were a prominent local family, engaged in many different business ventures. The house was owned by several generations of Braytons, and then a family foundation, until its sale in 1946.

== See also ==
- National Register of Historic Places listings in Bristol County, Massachusetts
