= Beatrice Arbour =

American baseball player (1920–2019)

- Shortstop
- Born: December 2, 1920; Gaspé, Quebec, Canada
- Died: June 10, 2019 (aged 98); Fall River, Massachusetts, U.S.
- Batted: Right Threw: Right

Teams
- Racine Belles (1947)

Career highlights and awards
- Women in Baseball – AAGPBL Permanent Display at Baseball Hall of Fame and Museum (since 1988); Somerset High School Athletic Hall of Fame Induction (2011)

Beatrice Parrott (née Arbour; December 2, 1920 – June 10, 2019) was an All-American Girls Professional Baseball League player. Listed at 5 ft 6 in (1.68 m), 128 lb (58 kg), she batted and threw right handed.

Born in Gaspé, Quebec, Arbour was raised in Somerset, Massachusetts, where she attended Somerset High School before there were sports teams for girls. Nevertheless, Arbour acquired some experience while playing with the American Legion Baseball boys' team in her hometown. In 1937, a group of girls, including Arbour, went before the Student Council and requested a girls' basketball league be formed. As a result, the first girls league was started with 50 ladies participating on five intramural teams. Arbour was recognized as the Most Athletic female of the Class of 1938.

In addition to her athletic accomplishments at school, Arbour played for the St. Patrick's Parish softball team, which competed against teams from as far away as New York.

In 1947, she joined the AAGPBL as a shortstop for the Racine Belles, which was one of the teams depicted in the 1992 film A League of Their Own. While playing for Racine, Arbour had a number of different jobs during the off-season to pay her bills, including an internship in an apple orchard.

After baseball, Arbour married Donald M. Parrott, who died in 2010. They had four children together; three boys and a girl. Arbour drove a school bus for 19 years.

Arbour is part of the AAGPBL permanent display at the Baseball Hall of Fame and Museum in Cooperstown, New York, which opened in 1988. The display is dedicated to the entire league rather than any individual figure.

In 2011, Arbour was inducted into the Somerset High School Athletic Hall of Fame. A year later, Arbour’s granddaughter, Jenny Parrott, honored her by publishing a book about her life entitled Famed Girl Athlete Now a Milkman: the Biography of Beatrice Arbour Parrott.

Arbour moved later to Fall River, Massachusetts, where she died in 2019 at the age of 98.
