= Dick Gibney =

American wrestler, coach, and administrator

Biographical details
- Born: December 9, 1943; Saratoga Springs, New York, U.S.
- Died: February 25, 1986 (aged 42); Bethlehem, Pennsylvania, U.S.

Playing career
- 1963–1966: Springfield

Coaching career (HC unless noted)
- 1967–1969: Kingswood School
- 1969–1976: Boston University

Administrative career (AD unless noted)
- 1974–1975: Boston University (Acting AD)
- 1976–1985: Syraucse (Associate AD)
- 1985–1986: Lehigh

Head coaching record
- Overall: 90–15 (.857)

Accomplishments and honors

Championships
- 1976 Yankee Conference championship

Awards
- 2x New England wrestling coach of the year (1970, 1975)

Richard Phillip "Dick" Gibney (December 9, 1943 – February 25, 1986) was an American coach and administrator who was the head wrestling coach at Boston University and athletic director at Lehigh University.

== Wrestling ==
A native of Saratoga Springs, New York, Gibney attended Springfield College and was a member of the wrestling team that finished the 1965–66 season with the #1 ranking in the NCAA College Division. He earned a bachelor of science degree in physical education from Springfield in 1966 and a master of education degree from the same college the following year.

== Coaching ==
After graduating from Springfield, Gibney became the wrestling coach and assistant athletic director at the Kingswood School in West Hartford, Connecticut. In 1969, he became the head wrestling coach at Boston University, which had reinstated wrestling as a intercollegiate sport after a 13-year absence. During his tenure as head coach, Gibney led BU to a 90–15 record. 15 of his wrestlers won New England championships and 11 competed in the NCAA Division I Wrestling Championships. He led BU to its first undefeated season in 1972–73 and its first Yankee Conference championship in any sport in 1975. He was named New England wrestling coach of the year in 1970 and 1975.

== Administration ==
In 1974, Gibney was named assistant to the director of athletics at Boston University. When AD Warren Schmakel left to take the same job at Illinois State University later that year, Gibney was named acting athletic director. He remained in this role until John Simpson was hired the following year. In 1976, Gibney left BU to become the associate athletic director at Syracuse University. He was a finalist for the athletic director's job at California State University, Fullerton in 1981, the University of Hawaiʻi at Mānoa in 1983 and the University of Oregon in 1984.

On January 1, 1985, Ginbey became the athletic director at Lehigh University. On February 25, 1986, campus police found Gibney's body in the shower next to his office. According to Northampton County Deputy Coroner Ed Madden, Gibney had tied a leather athletic jump rope around an overhead heating pipe and hanged himself.
