= Israel T. Almy =

American architect

- Born: December 24, 1892; Middletown, Rhode Island
- Died: December 14, 1963 (aged 70); Somerset, Massachusetts
- Occupation: Architect

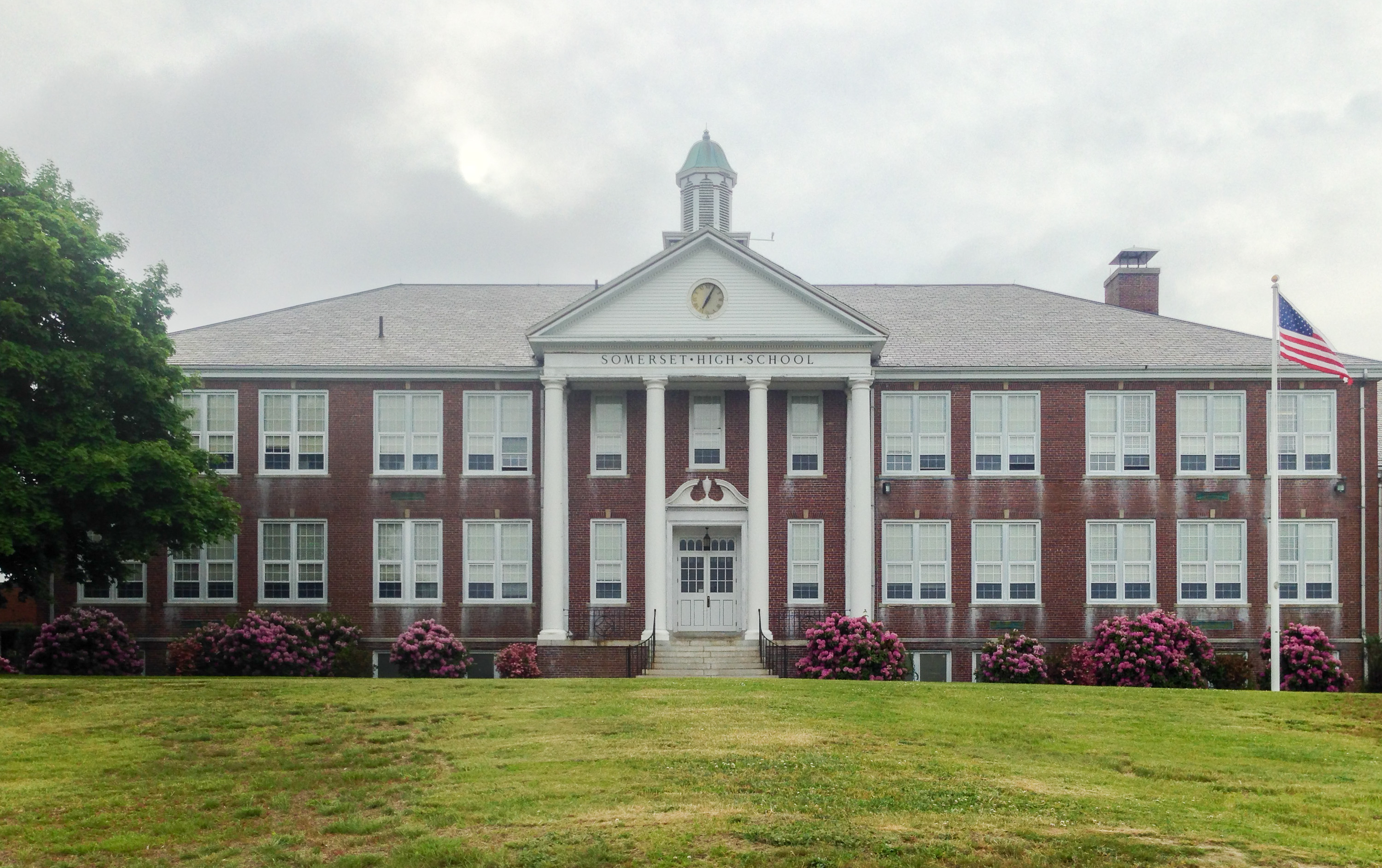
High School, Somerset, 1936–2014.

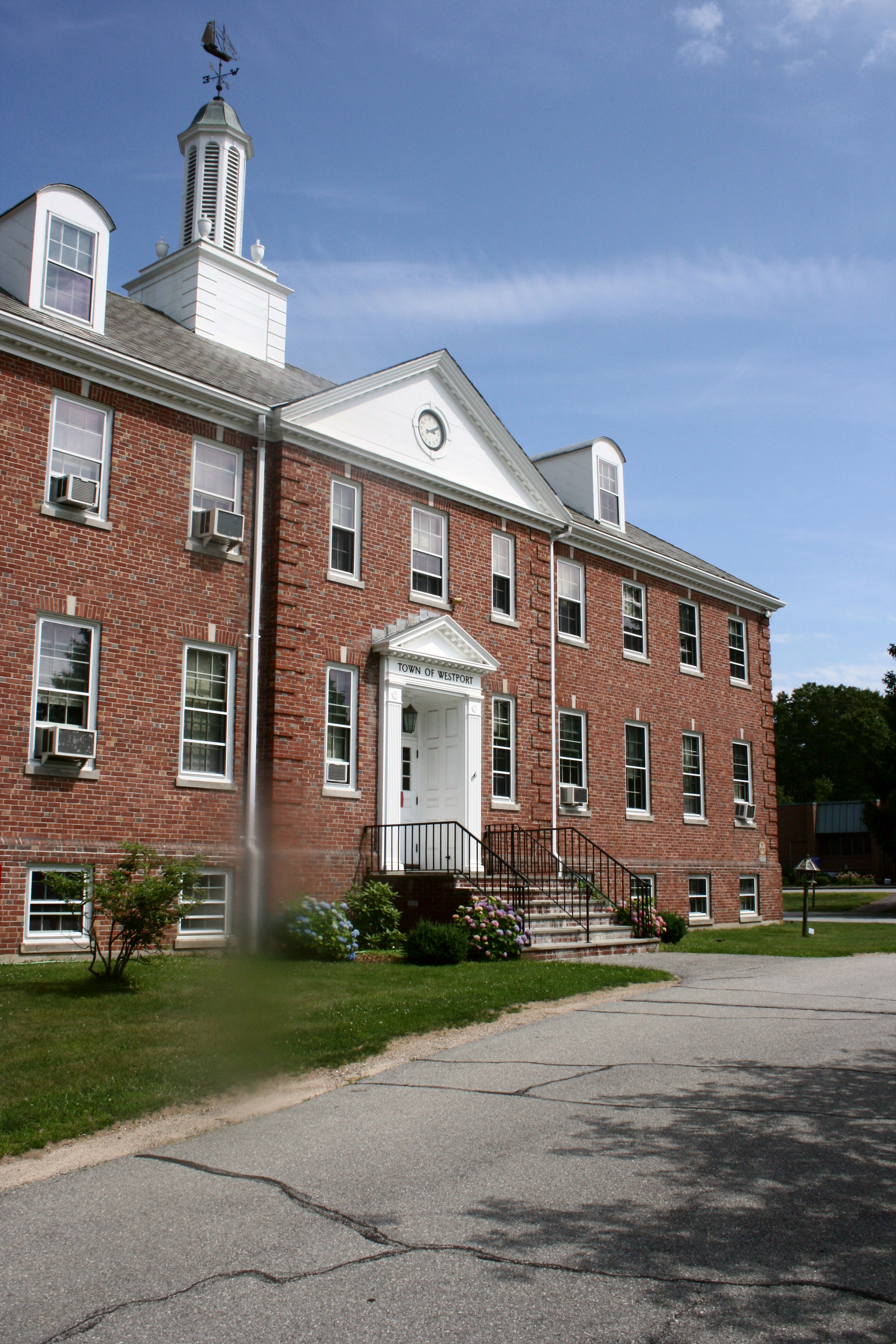
Town Hall, Westport, 1938.

Israel T. Almy (1892-1963) was an American architect from Fall River, Massachusetts.

== Life and career ==
Almy was born in Middletown, Rhode Island on Christmas Eve of 1892. In 1913 he took a position as a draftsman with Fall River architect Edward M. Corbett. He was educated at Northeastern College in Boston from 1919 to 1923, returning to Corbett after his graduation. He later became Corbett's business partner, and opened his own office soon afterwards, in 1935. He practiced alone until his death on December 14, 1963.

Mr. Almy's Architecture License number in MA was 4, making him among the first to be registered to practice in Massachusetts.

After his death, the firm became Israel T. Almy Associates, with Almy's son, Thomas B. Almy, as principal. The firm was later reduced to simply Almy Associates, with offices in Somerset.

== Works ==
- 1936 - Somerset High School (Old), 625 County St, Somerset, Massachusetts
  - Demolished in 2014
- 1937 - Henry F. Anthony School, 51 Middle Rd, Portsmouth, Rhode Island
- 1938 - Westport Town Hall, 816 Main St, Westport, Massachusetts
- 1939 - Sunset Hill Apartments, Sunset Hill, Fall River, Massachusetts
  - In association with Samuel T. Dubitsky
- 1948 - Strand Theater (Remodeling), 1363 Pleasant St, Fall River, Massachusetts
  - Altered
- 1949 - Freetown Elementary School, Bullock Rd, Freetown, Massachusetts
- 1950 - Joseph Case High School (Old), Main St, Swansea, Massachusetts
- 1951 - Palmer River Elementary School, Winthrop St, Rehoboth, Massachusetts
- 1952 - Dighton Elementary School, Somerset Ave, Dighton, Massachusetts
- 1953 - Westport Elementary School, 380 Old County Rd, Westport, Massachusetts
- 1954 - Sacred Heart R. C. School, Taunton, Massachusetts
- 1955 - Henry B. Burkland Junior High School, Mayflower Ave, Middleborough, Massachusetts
- 1956 - Hastings Junior High School, 30 School St, Fairhaven, Massachusetts
- 1957 - Apponequet Regional High School, Howland Rd, Lakeville, Massachusetts
- 1958 - School of Nursing, St. Anne's Hospital, 795 Middle St, Fall River, Massachusetts
- 1961 - Portsmouth High School, Education Ln, Portsmouth, Rhode Island
- 1963 - Barrington High School (Additions), Lincoln Ave, Barrington, Rhode Island
- 1964 - St. Joseph R. C. School, 100 Spring St, Fairhaven, Massachusetts
- 1965 - Somerset Police and Fire Station, 465 County St, Somerset, Massachusetts
- 1966 - Somerset Junior High School, 1141 Brayton Ave, Somerset, Massachusetts
- 1967 - Thomas Chew Memorial, 803 Bedford St, Fall River, Massachusetts
