= Rhoda Leonard =

American baseball player

- Rhoda Leonard
- Second base / Outfield
- Born: January 31, 1928; Somerset, Massachusetts, U.S.
- Died: October 21, 2015 (aged 87); Norwood, Massachusetts, U.S.
- Batted: Right Threw: Right

Teams
- Fort Wayne Daisies (1946)

Career highlights and awards
- Women in Baseball – AAGPBL Permanent Display at Baseball Hall of Fame and Museum (1988)

Rhoda Leonard (January 31, 1928 – October 21, 2015) was an American infielder and outfielder who played in the All-American Girls Professional Baseball League (AAGPBL). Listed at 5' 5", 115 lb., Leonard batted and threw right handed. She was nicknamed 'Nicky' by her friends and teammates.

Born in Somerset, Massachusetts, Leonard attended Somerset High School, where she graduated and later earned Somerset Athletic Hall of Fame honors in 1946. This prompted an invitation to an AAGPBL tryout and she made the grade, but she did not get much of a chance to play in her only season in the league.

Leonard joined the Fort Wayne Daisies in 1946 and was used sparingly at second base and outfield, collecting a batting average of .095 (2-for-21) in nine game appearances.

After baseball, Leonard married Edmund Linehan and had two children, Mark and Maggie. She then graduated from Bridgewater State University in Bridgewater, Massachusetts in 1950, and after raising her family served for many years as a teacher for the Norwood Public Schools system for a long time. Some of her most cherished teaching moments came during her years of work with students at St. Catherine's School.

Following her retirement, she became an avid golfer and member of the WGAM. She also was awarded a lifetime membership to the Walpole Country Club after serving as their club secretary for several years, while enjoying many years as a lifetime member of the AAGPBL Players Association.

The AAGPBL folded in 1954, but there is now a permanent display at the Baseball Hall of Fame and Museum at Cooperstown, New York since November 5, 1988 that honors those who were part of this unique experience. Leonard, along with the rest of the league's girls, is included at the display exhibition.

Nicky Leonard died in 2015 in Norwood, Massachusetts at age 87, following complications from Alzheimer's disease.
