= Shirley May France =

American swimmer

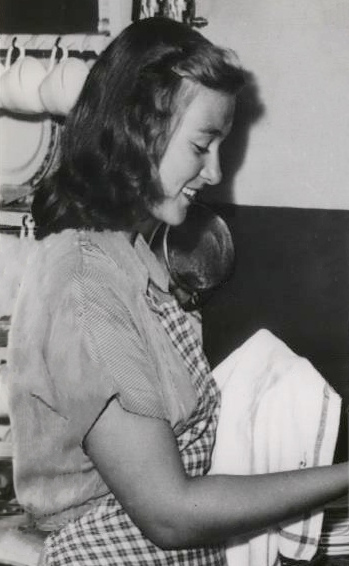
- Shirley May France in 1949

Personal information
- Born: August 11, 1932
- Died: March 18, 2012 (aged 79)

Sport
- Sport: Swimming

Shirley May France (August 11, 1932 – March 18, 2012) was, at the time, the youngest woman to attempt to swim the English Channel, although her three attempts in 1949 and 1950 were unsuccessful. She was born in Fall River, Massachusetts. She was the first woman to swim across Lake George in the U.S. states of New York and Vermont. She lived in Somerset, Massachusetts, and had five children. She died in 2012.
