= Wilbur Elementary School =

Location
- 816 Brayton Point Road; New England; Somerset, Bristol, Massachusetts 02726; United States; 41°43′21.4″N 71°10′44.8″W

Information
- Closed: June 24, 2014
- Grades: K–5
- Nickname: Owls
- Website: Somerset school district

Wilbur Elementary School is a former elementary school located in Somerset, Massachusetts, United States. The school included kindergarten through fifth grade. It was involved with a state test scam which resulted in the invalidation of 74 test scores. In June 2014, the school closed permanently.

== MCAS controversy ==
The Wilbur School had the highest fifth grade mathematics scores of any elementary school in the state on the Massachusetts Comprehensive Assessment System test, according to results that were released the week of September 13, 2010. Of the 28 fifth graders at Wilbur School during the last school year, 79 percent scored in the advanced category of the MCAS test, while the other 21 percent scored in the proficient category. None of the fifth graders at the Wilbur School scored in the needs improvement or failing categories. "We are delighted and surprised that we were ranked first in the state," Wilbur School Principal Joan DeAngelis said. The scores are based on tests that were taken during the previous school year, so the students who received the high marks were, at the time sixth graders at Somerset Middle School. Somerset School Superintendent Richard Medeiros said the Wilbur School was one of the few schools in the state that did not have one grade five student fail the mathematics section of the MCAS test or score in the needs improvement category. He said those types of scores are unheard of on the test and said one of the goals of the federal No Child Left Behind Act is to have all students scoring in the proficient and advanced levels of the MCAS test by 2014. "Many educators would say that is not possible, but they met that," Mr. Medeiros said of the students at the Wilbur School. This sparked controversy. For some parents who had watched their children struggle all year with math assignments, the stellar results didn’t add up. The year before, almost one in three fifth-graders had failed to reach proficiency. This time around, none failed to reach that mark. State education officials investigated whether the scores were legitimate after receiving complaints from suspicious parents. One parent told officials that her child received an “advanced’’ score on the MCAS after receiving mediocre marks in her math class. On April 11, 2011, The Herald News, a Fall River-based newspaper, reported that all 74 test scores were voided. They were invalidated after a state investigation which showed a high rate of wrong answers changed to correct ones. The investigation found a decidedly higher number of erasures than the state average on answer booklets, with a “vast majority” of answers changed from incorrect responses to correct ones. The state also found a disturbing pattern of answers to open-response questions in which students’ original responses were erased and replaced with correct answers that were not supported by the students’ original computations and logic. DeAngelis resigned from Somerset Public Schools in August 2012.

In January 2014, the Somerset School Committee voted 4–1 to close Wilbur School effective for the 2014–2015 school year.
