= Blackstone-Millville Regional High School =

Location
- 175 Lincoln Street; Blackstone, MA 01504
- Coordinates: 42°01′49″N 71°32′31″W

Information
- Type: Public high school
- School district: Blackstone-Millville Regional School District
- Principal: Jill Foulis
- Faculty: 39.3 (FTE)
- Grades: 8-12
- Enrollment: 534 (as of 2024-2025)
- Student to teacher ratio: 13.6
- Colors: Purple & Gold
- Athletics conference: Central Massachusetts Athletic Conference
- Team name: Chargers
- Communities served: Blackstone, Millville
- Website: School website

Blackstone-Millville Regional High School is a high school in Blackstone, Worcester County, Massachusetts, United States, operating as part of the Blackstone-Millville Regional School District. It serves both the town of Blackstone and its western neighbor, Millville.

== History ==
The first high school in Blackstone was built in 1868 on School Street. It was replaced in 1920 with a new high school on Main Street. The Main Street building was expanded in 1938. As population in the area grew, regionalization was discussed as a way to provide a new high school for Blackstone and Millville. The Blackstone-Millville Regional School District, which regionalized grades 7-12, was approved by voters in both towns in 1967 and charged with planning and establishing a regional junior-senior high school to be located on Lincoln Street in Blackstone.

Following the sale of school district construction bonds, Blackstone-Millville Junior-Senior High School opened its doors in September 1970 serving students in grades 7 through 12 and the former high school building was retained by the district for use as an intermediate elementary school.

Blackstone and Millville maintained separate K-6 school committees until 1982, when school budget cuts resulting from Massachusetts Proposition 2½ going into effect pushed the towns to work out a plan to modify the regional district to establish a K-12 regional district, approved by voters at Special Town Meetings in April 1982. The Blackstone-Millville Regional School District began operating as a K-12 regional district on July 1, 1982. When Frederick W. Hartnett Middle School opened in 2003, the high school realigned to serve students in grades 9 through 12.

== School demographics ==
- The data includes eighth grade students. Number of eighth grade students = 111.

According to Massachusetts Department of Elementary and Secondary Education annual statistics, for the 2024-2025 academic year, the demographic enrollment distributions for race, gender and grade level at Blackstone-Millville Regional High School are as follows:

Total number of enrolled students: 534
Total number of full-time equivalent educators: 39.3
Therefore, the student to teacher ratio for this school is 13.6:1

Enrollment by Race/Ethnicity (2024-2025)
Race	Enrolled Pupils*	% of District
African American	13	2.4%
Asian	7	1.3%
Hispanic	79	14.8%
Native American	0	0.0%
White	414	77.5%
Native Hawaiian, Pacific Islander	0	0.0%
Multi-Race, Non-Hispanic	21	3.9%
Total	534	100%

* Approximate number of enrolled pupils is calculated based on total number of students in district, multiplied by reported percentage, and rounded to nearest whole student.

Enrollment by gender (2024-2025)
Gender	Enrolled pupils	Percentage
Female	256	47.94%
Male	275	51.5%
Non-binary	3	0.56%
Total	534	100%

Enrollment by Grade
Grade	Pupils Enrolled	Percentage
9	119	22.28%
10	108	20.22%
11	103	19.29%
12	90	16.85%
SP*	3	0.56%
Total	534	100%

* SP = Special Education Beyond Grade 12

== Extracurricular activities ==
=== Athletics ===
The Blackstone-Millville Regional Chargers compete in the Dual Valley Conference.

The boys' cross-country team won 265 consecutive dual meets between 1974 and 1993, a national record that stood until 2004.

=== Marching band ===
The Blackstone-Millville Regional High School Chargers Marching Band has traveled throughout North America for national competitions and parades, including the National Cherry Blossom Festival, the Rose Parade, and the Macy's Thanksgiving Day Parade.

Championship titles won by the Marching Chargers include:

- Group IV A "Silver" United States Scholastic Band Association: 2000, 2001
- New England Scholastic Band Association winter percussion: 2013
- Bands of America Regional Class A Championship in Towson, MD: 2013
- Division 4 Open USBands National Championships: 2015, 2016, 2019.
- Division 3 Open USBands National Championships 2021

== Notable people ==
=== Notable alumni ===
- Jennifer Lanctot O'Neill (1986), mile champion at the 1991 NCAA indoor championships, Boston University's first three-time female All-American
- Tim McNamara (1914), Major League Baseball pitcher

=== Notable faculty ===
- Ambrose Kennedy, U.S. Representative from Rhode Island
- Hurley Silbor, Massachusetts State Baseball Coaches' Hall of Fame inductee
