= John Simpson (athletic director) =

American football coach and administrator (1925 - 2010)

Biographical details
- Born: February 7, 1925; Brookline, Massachusetts, U.S.
- Died: August 31, 2010 (aged 85); Nashua, New Hampshire, U.S.

Playing career

Football
- 1946–1949: Boston University
- Positions: Guard, linebacker

Coaching career (HC unless noted)
- 1952–1957: Somerset HS (MA)
- 1958–1961: Colby (line)
- 1962–1966: Colby

Administrative career (AD unless noted)
- 1952–1957: Somerset HS (MA)
- 1975–1984: Boston University

Head coaching record
- Overall: 8–32 (college); 41–7–1 (high school)

John Boone Simpson (February 7, 1925 – August 31, 2010) was an American football coach and athletics administrator. He served as the head football coach at who served as athletic director at Colby College in Waterville, Maine from 1962 to 1966, compiling a record of 8–32. Simpson was the athletic director at Boston University from 1975 to 1984.

== Early life ==
Simpson was born on February 7, 1925, in Brookline, Massachusetts, to Harold and Hazel (Boone) Simpson. He played linebacker for Harry Downes Brookline High School. He graduated in 1942 and served in the Pacific with the United States Marine Corps during World War II. He enrolled at Boston University (BU) in 1946 and played guard and linebacker for the Boston University Terriers football team. He graduated in 1950 with a degree in education. He served with the Marines again during the Korean War.

== Coaching ==
Simpson was the athletic director and football coach at Somerset High School from 1952 to 1957. He compiled a 41–7–1 in his six years as coach. In 1958 he became the head track coach and an assistant football coach at Colby College. He also became the freshman hockey coach under Jack Kelley. Although Simpson never played hockey he had been the student manager of the BU team when Kelley played there. In 1962 he was promoted to head football coach.

== Athletic director ==
Simpson stopped coaching after the 1966 season, but remained with the Colby as director of summer and special programs. He then served as director of adult education for the Biddeford, Maine school district. In 1975 he was named athletic director at Boston University. He gained full control over the athletic program in 1977 when BU reassigned its dean of physical development programs.

Under Simpson, Boston University's men's hockey team won four straight ECAC and won the national championship in 1978. In 1982, he hired Rick Pitino to coach the men's basketball team. In his first year as coach, Pitino led the Terriers to its first ECAC North title its first NCAA tournament appearance since 1959. Under head coach Rick Taylor, BU's football team qualified for the NCAA I-AA playoffs for three straight seasons (1982, 1983, 1984). Simpson also helped found Hockey East, which began play in fall 1984. In 1984, Simpson was promoted to vice president and national director for athletic fundraising and executive director of the university's alumni association. He retired in 1992.

== Personal life ==
Simpson met his wife, Dorothy Porteri, when they were both students at BU. They married on April 22, 1951, and had three children. Simpson was a longtime resident of Boxford, Massachusetts, but moved to Nashua, New Hampshire in 1998. He died on August 31, 2010, at St. Joseph Hospital, after a massive stroke.

== Head coaching record ==
=== College ===
Year	Team	Overall	Conference	Standing	Bowl/playoffs
Colby Mules (Maine Intercollegiate Athletic Association) (1962–1966)
1962	Colby	1–7			
1963	Colby	3–5			
1964	Colby	1–7			
1965	Colby	2–6			
1966	Colby	1–7	0–2	3rd	
Total:		8–32			
