= WOMR =

Community radio station in Provincetown, Massachusetts, United States

WOMR and WFMR

WOMR: Provincetown, Massachusetts; WFMR: Orleans, Massachusetts; United States
- Broadcast area: Hyannis, Massachusetts; Cape Cod; South Shore
- Frequencies: WOMR: 92.1 MHz; WFMR: 91.3 MHz

Programming
- Format: community radio
- Affiliations: Pacifica Radio Network

Ownership
- Owner: Lower Cape Communications, Inc.

History
- First air date: WOMR: March 21, 1982; WFMR: 2010
- Call sign meaning: WOMR: "Outermost Radio"; WFMR: "Furthermost Radio"

Technical information
- Licensing authority: FCC
- Facility ID: WOMR: 38905; WFMR: 93704
- Class: WOMR: A; WFMR: A
- ERP: WOMR: 6,000 watts; WFMR: 1,600 watts
- HAAT: WOMR: 49 meters (161 ft); WFMR: 73 meters (240 ft)
- Transmitter coordinates: WOMR: 42°3′54.3″N 70°9′29.0″W; WFMR: 41°47′29.4″N 69°59′36.1″W

Links
- Public license information: WOMR: Public file; LMS; WFMR: Public file; LMS
- Webcast: Listen live
- Website: womr.org

WOMR (92.1 FM) is a non-commercial community radio station based in Provincetown, Massachusetts. Its call sign stands for "Outermost Radio". It started broadcasting on March 21, 1982, at 91.9 MHz with a power of 1,000 watts. November 1995, it changed its frequency to 92.1 MHz and increased its power to 6,000 watts, which expanded its reach to more of Plymouth and the South Shore. In 2010, WOMR installed a second transmitter in Orleans, under the call sign WFMR (Furthermost Radio), which transmits on 91.3 MHz. WFMR rebroadcasts programming generated for WOMR.

== History ==
WOMR began transmitting on 91.9 MHz on March 21, 1982, with an announcement about the station beginning normal programming the next day. The station was founded in the mid-1970s by Provincetown resident Mark Primack. WOMR's effective radiated power was increased in November 1995 from 1 to 6 kilowatts. In 2009, executive director Dave Myers stepped down for health reasons.

== Programming ==
The station broadcasts 24 hours a day, with programming produced by a combination of volunteers and a small number of full-time staff. DJs at WOMR provide a wide variety of music programming, including folk, jazz, rock, and other genres. In October 2009, WOMR replaced its analog transmitter with a digital/analog model. The station also plays talk shows with local-interest interviews and community news along with some programs from across the country. The station also broadcasts some nationally syndicated spoken-word content. With an emergency backup system, WOMR can stay on the air in power outages, bringing vital information to the Cape and South Shore communities. WOMR participates in community events and produces programming that supports local culture and organizations.

== Partnerships ==
WOMR partners with local Cape Cod communities and community organizations, joining festivals and events across Cape Cod, occasionally with live remote broadcasts. The station often partners with the Payomet Performing Arts Center in Truro and with Wellfleet Preservation Hall to produce concerts and film events.

From 2011 to 2015, film director Alan Chebot produced Outermost Radio, a film about the diversity of the station's programmers, and the challenges the station faced in 2012 when their main antenna toppled and needed to be replaced.

== See also ==
- List of community radio stations in the United States
