= Provincetown International Film Festival =

Film festival

- Location: Provincetown, Massachusetts, U.S.
- Founded: 1999
- Website: provincetownfilm.org

The Provincetown International Film Festival (PIFF) is an annual film festival founded in 1999 and held on Cape Cod in Provincetown, Massachusetts. The festival presents American and international narrative features, documentaries and short films for five days in June of each year.

The festival is a program of the Provincetown Film Society, the non-profit parent organization which also operates the year-round Waters Edge Cinema (formerly known as Whaler's Wharf Cinema), a year-round Provincetown movie theater presenting what it considers the best in current independent and international cinema.

The festival hosts films and panel discussions and incorporates the cultural, historic, and artistic character of Provincetown: with its thriving art colony, its large gay and lesbian population, its original Native American and Portuguese heritage, and its congenial scenic setting. In keeping with its mission, the festival often presents films about countercultural figures, such as John Lennon, Allen Ginsberg, William S. Burroughs, BeBe Zahara Benet, and Andrea Dworkin.

In 2022, the Provincetown International Film Festival became an Academy Awards-qualifying festival. Short films that receive Best Narrative Short, Best Queer Short and Best Documentary Short awards are automatically eligible to enter the Short Films competition for the concurrent season of the Oscars.

== History ==
Founded in 1999, the first opening night film was Run Lola Run.

Other notable premieres have included A Master Builder, Hedwig and the Angry Inch, American Splendor, Whale Rider, Hunt for the Wilderpeople, Cameraperson, Howl, The Innocents, Brittany Runs a Marathon, Vita & Virginia, and Coffee & Cigarettes. Retrospective screenings have included Some Like It Hot, Grey Gardens, Clerks, Showgirls, Sunday Bloody Sunday, Faster, Pussycat! Kill! Kill! and the 50th anniversary of Psycho.

Notable attendees include Lily Tomlin, Ted Kennedy, Victoria Reggie Kennedy, Jim Jarmusch, Kevin Smith, Tilda Swinton, D.A. Pennebaker, Chris Hegedus, Ira Kaplan, Al Maysles, Faith Hubley, Parker Posey, Mira Nair, Christine Vachon, Alan Cumming, Chloë Sevigny, Michael Musto, Patricia Clarkson, David Cronenberg, Todd Haynes, Sofia Coppola, Gus Van Sant, Jillian Bell, Tab Hunter, Ang Lee, Barney Frank and former FBI deputy director Andrew McCabe.

Cult filmmaker John Waters hosts events or presents awards at PIFF every year.

== Awards ==
In its ongoing mission to honor the work of both established and emerging directors, PIFF has established a number of awards.

=== Awarded Films ===
2010 Awards

The 2010 Awards were given to the following films:

- Undertow, directed by Javier Fuentes-León: HBO Audience Award Best Narrative Feature (tie)
- Mao's Last Dancer, directed by Bruce Beresford: HBO Audience Award Best Narrative Feature (tie)
- Waste Land, directed by Lucy Walker: HBO Audience Award Best Documentary Feature
- Come on Down, directed by Joseph Laraja, HBO Audience Award Best Short Film
- She's a Fox, directed by Cameron Sawyer, Student Film Grand Jury Prize
2012 Awards

The 2012 Awards were given to the following films:

- Any Day Now, directed by Travis Fine: HBO Audience Award Best Narrative Feature
- The Invisible War, directed by Kirby Dick: HBO Audience Award Best Documentary Feature
- Dik, directed by Christopher Stollery: HBO Audience Award Best Short Film
- How to Survive a Plague, directed by David France: The John Schlesinger Award (given to a first time documentary or narrative feature filmmaker)
- Shoot the Moon, directed by Alexander Gaeta: Jury Award / Student Short Film
- Who Lasts Longer, directed by Gregorio Muro: Jury Award / Animated Short Film
- Tsuyako, directed by Mitsuyo Miyazaki: Jury Award / Live Action Short Film
2022 Awards

The 2022 awards were given to the following films:

- Good Luck to You, Leo Grande, directed by Sophie Hyde: Warner Bros. Discovery Audience Award Best Narrative Feature
- Esther Newton Made Me Gay, directed by Jean Carlomusto: Warner Bros. Discovery Audience Award Best Documentary Feature
- A Love Song, directed by Max Walker-Silverman: John Schlesinger Award Best Narrative Feature
- The Territory, directed by Alex Pritz: John Schlesinger Award Best Documentary Feature
- Fanmi, directed by Sandrine Brodeur-Desrosiers and Carmine Pierre-Dufour: Jury Award / Narrative Short Film
- Monsieur le Butch, directed by Jude Dry: Jury Award / New England Short Film
- Holding Moses, directed by Rivkah Beth Medow: Jury Award / Documentary Short Film
- Pottero, directed by Lindsey Martin: Jury Award / Animated Short Film
- Too Rough, directed by Sean Lìonadh: Jury Award / Queer Short Film
- Cans Can't Stand, directed by Matt Nadel and Megan Plotka: Jury Award / Special Jury Prize

In addition to the usual "best film" types of awards, each year PIFF presents three unique and prestigious awards:

Filmmaker on the Edge Award, presented to a film artist whose outstanding achievement, innovation, and vision continue to push the boundaries of film.

The John Schlesinger Award, presented to a first-time feature film director whose work commemorates the legacy of one of our finest American directors. One narrative awardee and one documentary awardee annually.

Excellence in Acting Award, presented to a film artist whose admirable body of work pushes the boundaries of the medium, demonstrating originality and innovation.

Next Wave Award, presented to a film artist who has an exciting and distinctive voice, takes artistic risks, and has a commitment to independent film.

=== Filmmaker on the Edge Award ===
- 1999: John Waters
- 2000: Christine Vachon
- 2001: Ted Hope & James Schamus
- 2002: Gus Van Sant
- 2003: Todd Haynes
- 2004: Jim Jarmusch
- 2005: Mary Harron
- 2006: Gregg Araki
- 2007: Todd Solondz
- 2008: Quentin Tarantino
- 2009: Guy Maddin
- 2010: Kevin Smith
- 2011: Darren Aronofsky
- 2012: Roger Corman
- 2013: Harmony Korine
- 2014: David Cronenberg
- 2015: Bobcat Goldthwait
- 2016: Ang Lee
- 2017: Sofia Coppola
- 2018: Sean Baker
- 2019: John Cameron Mitchell
- 2021: Richard Linklater
- 2022: Luca Guadagnino
- 2023: Bruce LaBruce
- 2024: Andrew Haigh
- 2025: Ari Aster
- 2026: Ryan Murphy

=== The John Schlesinger Award ===
- 2014:
  - Documentary: Alan Hicks for Keep on Keepin' On
- 2015:
  - Narrative: Mélanie Laurent for Breathe
  - Documentary: Alan Chebot for Outermost Radio
- 2016:
  - Narrative: Remy Auberjonois for Blood Stripe
  - Documentary: Adam Irving for Off the Rails
- 2017:
  - Narrative: Dave McCary for Brigsby Bear
  - Documentary: Anthony Caronna and Alexander Smith for Susanne Bartsch: On Top
- 2018:
  - Narrative: Ofir Raul Graizer for The Cakemaker
  - Documentary: Joanna James for A Fine Line
- 2019:
  - Narrative: Carlo Mirabella-Davis for Swallow
  - Documentary: David Charles Rodrigues for Gay Chorus Deep South
- 2021:
  - Narrative: Bassam Tariq for Mogul Mowgli
  - Documentary: Questlove for Summer of Soul
- 2022:
  - Narrative: Max Walker-Silverman for A Love Song
  - Documentary: Alex Pritz for The Territory
- 2023:
  - Narrative: Savanah Leaf for Earth Mama
  - Documentary: Zackary Drucker, Kristen Lovell for The Stroll
- 2024:
  - Narrative: Robert Kolodny for The Featherweight
  - Documentary: Julian Brave NoiseCat and Emily Kassie for Sugarcane

=== Excellence in Acting Award ===
- 2002: Marcia Gay Harden
- 2006: Lili Taylor
- 2007: Alan Cumming
- 2008: Gael García Bernal
- 2009: Alessandro Nivola
- 2010: Tilda Swinton
- 2011: Vera Farmiga
- 2012: Parker Posey
- 2013: Matt Dillon
- 2014: Patricia Clarkson
- 2016: Cynthia Nixon
- 2017: Chloë Sevigny
- 2018: Molly Shannon
- 2019: Judith Light
- 2021: Riz Ahmed
- 2022: Dale Dickey
- 2023: Billy Porter
- 2024: Colman Domingo
- 2025: Murray Bartlett

=== Next Wave Award ===
- 2017: Aubrey Plaza
- 2018: Chloe Grace Moretz
- 2019: Jillian Bell
- 2020: Mya Taylor
- 2021: Natalie Morales
- 2022: Jenny Slate & Bowen Yang
- 2023: Megan Stalter & Julio Torres
- 2024: Joel Kim Booster

=== Career Achievement ===
- 2007: Kathleen Turner
- 2008: Michael Childers
- 2009: Strand Releasing
- 2011: Albert Maysles

=== Faith Hubley Memorial Award ===
- 2003: Mira Nair
- 2008: Jane Lynch
- 2010: Rob Epstein and Jeffrey Friedman
- 2012: Kirby Dick
- 2013: Edward Lachman
- 2014: Debra Winger
- 2015: Jennifer Coolidge
