= Outermost Radio =

Documentary written and directed by Alan Chebot

Outermost Radio is a feature-length documentary, written and directed by Alan Chebot, that takes an intimate look at a community on the tip of Cape Cod, far from the mainland and out of the mainstream, committed to keeping their alternative non-profit community radio station WOMR on the air through adversity.

Broadcasting from the outermost region of Provincetown, Massachusetts, WOMR reaches beyond locals and tourists, to a rapidly growing fan base around the world, redefining the very concept of community. Outermost Radio introduces audiences to the station's passionate and unconventional volunteer staff as they fight to keep their freedom of expression alive and in the process, give us an unflinching look into their personal lives.

Outermost Radio features a live performance from The Blind Boys of Alabama.

Outermost Radio was selected by the 2015 Provincetown International Film Festival where Chebot won the John Schlesinger Award. The film was also selected in 2015 by the Kansas International Film Festival, the St. Louis International Film Festival, and the Hamptons Take 2 Documentary Film Festival. In 2016, Outermost Radio continued its festival tour at Idyllwild International Festival of Cinema in Idyllwild, CA, where the film won Best Director honors, and in February 2016 at the International Filmmaker Festival of World Cinema, London. In April 2016, Outermost Radio won a Gold Remi Award at WorldFest Houston International Film Festival. Outermost Radio continued on to be screened at the International Filmmaker Festival of World Cinema, Nice in May 2016. In June 2017, Outermost Radio was awarded the New England Emmy Award for Outstanding Documentary Feature.

== Awards and honors ==
- Outermost Radio, Provincetown International Film Festival Selection (2015)
- Outermost Radio, The John Schlesinger Award Winner (2015)
- Outermost Radio, Kansas International Film Festival Selection (2015)
- Outermost Radio, St. Louis International Film Festival Selection (2015)
- Outermost Radio, Hamptons Take 2 Documentary Film Festival Selection (2015)
- Outermost Radio, The Spotlight Documentary Film Awards Silver Award Winner (2015)
- Outermost Radio, Idyllwild International Festival of Cinema Selection (2016)
- Outermost Radio, International Filmmaker Festival of World Cinema, London Selection (2016)
- Outermost Radio, Best Director, Alan Chebot, Idyllwild International Festival of Cinema (2016)
- Outermost Radio, Gold Remi Award, WorldFest Houston International Film Festival (2016)
- Outermost Radio, Outstanding Documentary, New England Emmy Award Winner (2017)
