= Joseph Case High School =

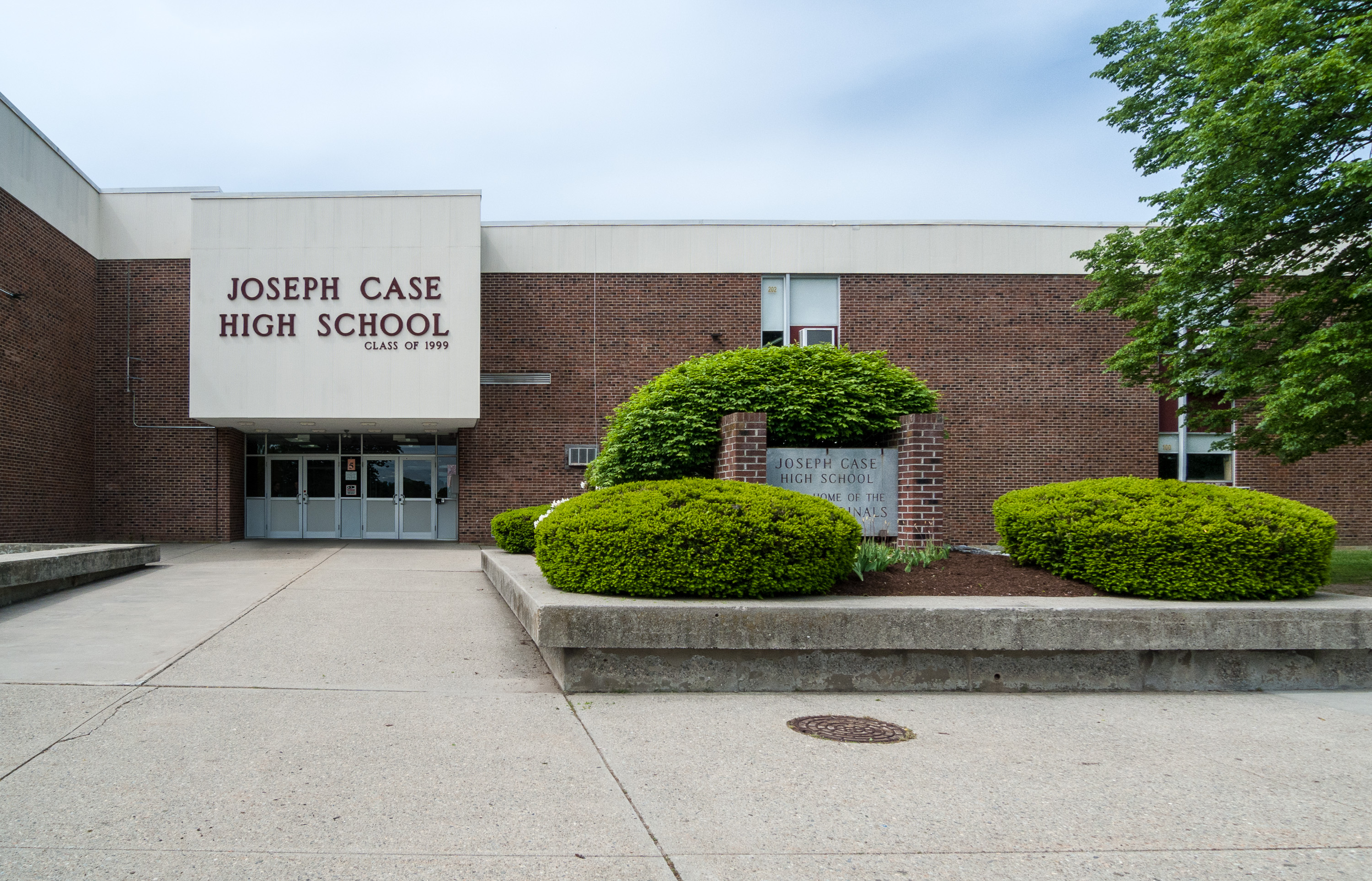
- Case High School in 2017.

Location
- 70 School Street; Swansea, Massachusetts 02777; United States; 41.7541°N 71.2012°W

Information
- Type: Public high school
- Motto: We are All Cardinals.
- Established: 1927
- Founder: Elizabeth Richmond Case
- School district: Swansea Public Schools
- Principal: Christopher Costa
- Teaching staff: 46.75 (FTE)
- Grades: 9-12
- Enrollment: 514 (2024–2025)
- Student to teacher ratio: 10.99
- Language: English
- Colors: Maroon and Gold
- Accreditation: New England Association of Schools and Colleges
- Newspaper: The Cardinal
- Yearbook: The Chief
- Affiliation: Massachusetts Interscholastic Athletic Association; South Coast Conference
- Website: swanseaschools.org

Joseph Case High School is a public high school located in Swansea, Massachusetts. The school, accredited by the New England Association of Schools and Colleges, hosts grades 9-12 and has a population of over 500 students.

== History ==
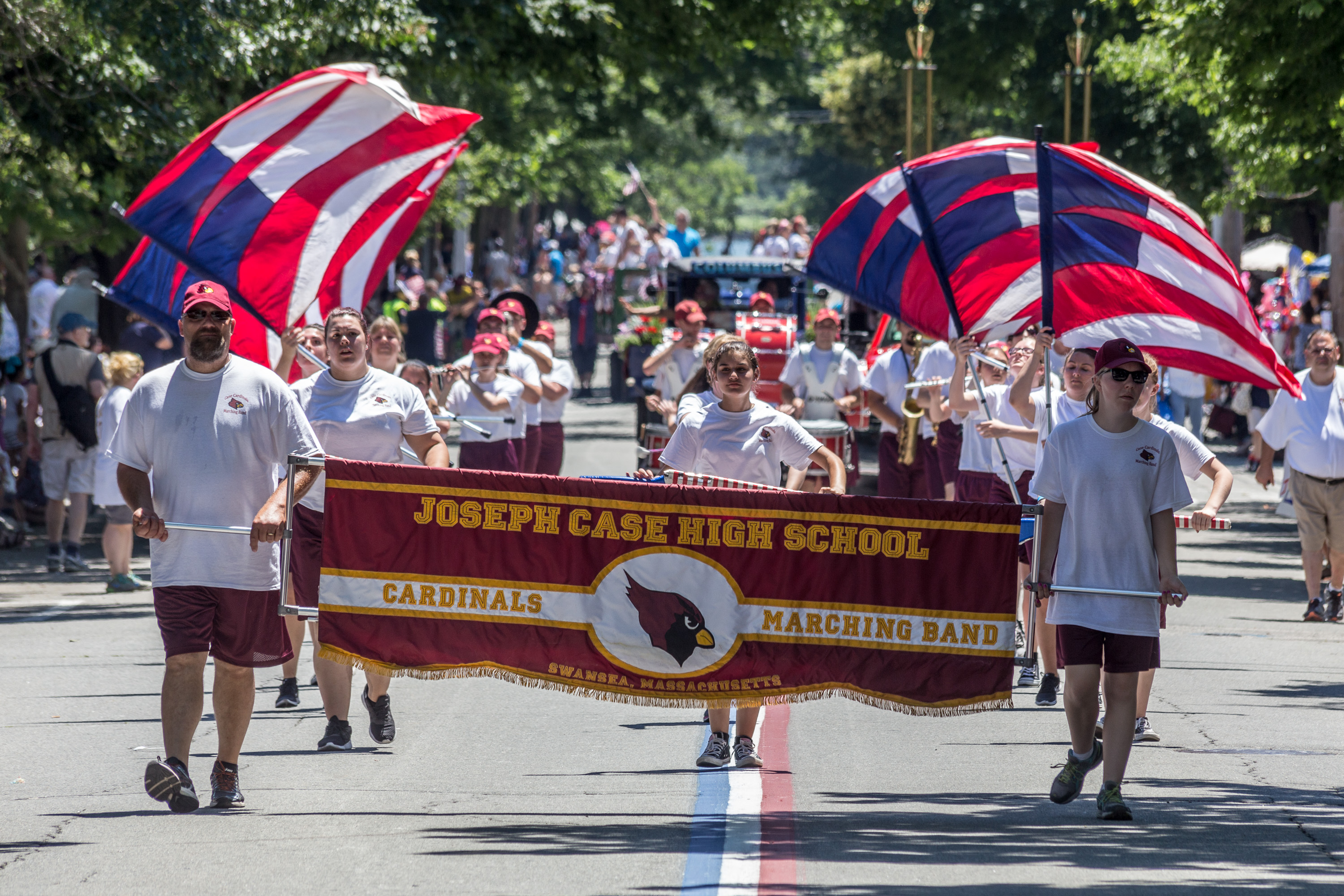
Case High School students marching in the Bristol Fourth of July Parade in 2017.

Joseph Case High School is named after the father of Elizabeth Richmond Case, a local philanthropist who married Frank Shaw Stevens. In 1927, Case donated funds to create the first high school in Swansea and chose the dedication to her father. In 1950, the architect Israel T. Almy designed the school building.

Case High School, known athletically as the Cardinals, competes within the South Coast Conference of the Massachusetts Interscholastic Athletic Association. Their marching band won both New England and Massachusetts USBands championships in 2014. Five years later, they also were victorious in the New England Scholastic Band Association championship.

== Notable alumni ==
- Antone S. Aguiar Jr. (1948), politician
- Bob Evans (1990), professional wrestler
- David Leite (1978), writer
- Glenn Orton (1966), planetary scientist and astronomer
- David J. Place (1996), politician

== See also ==
- List of high schools in Massachusetts
