= Alan Chebot =

American film director

Alan Chebot is an American film director and executive producer, born in Fall River, Massachusetts and raised in Somerset, Massachusetts.

== Career ==
Chebot began his professional career as a producer for WBZ-TV Boston's Evening Magazine. In 1988, Chebot founded Parallax Productions, Inc., a video, multimedia and film production company that works with a diverse client base including television networks, media companies, public relations and advertising agencies, corporations, and foundations. Parallax Productions is headquartered in Boston, Massachusetts, with crews all over the U.S. and many countries around the world. Parallax produces broadcast programming, documentaries, commercials, PSAs, and web content.

In the late 90s, he was the creator, executive producer and director of the nationally syndicated television series, The Wild Wild Web. The series ran for three seasons and was considered the television guide to the Internet. Distributed by CBS/King World, The Wild Wild Web series aired in 148 U.S. markets.

In 2006, Chebot produced, wrote, and directed Song for New Orleans. Broadcast nationally and distributed internationally by Hearst Television, the feature-length film chronicles the rebirth of the New Orleans music scene immediately after the devastation of Hurricane Katrina, and won two bronze Telly Awards.

From 2011–2015, Chebot directed and executive produced Outermost Radio, a feature-length documentary film about a community on the tip of Cape Cod and their non-profit community radio station WOMR. Outermost Radio was selected by the Provincetown International Film Festival where Chebot won The John Schlesinger Award and was also selected by the Kansas International Film Festival, the St. Louis International Film Festival, and the Hamptons Take 2 Documentary Film Festival in 2015. In 2016, Outermost Radio continued its festival tour at Idyllwild International Festival of Cinema in Idyllwild, California, where Chebot was awarded Best Director - Documentary. The film was then screened at the International Filmmaker Festival of World Cinema in London, and at the International Filmmaker Festival in Nice, France. In April 2016, Outermost Radio won the prestigious Remi Award at the WorldFest Houston International Film Festival. In June 2017, Outermost Radio was awarded the New England Emmy Award for Outstanding Documentary Feature.

Chebot was featured on WBUR-FM, Chronicle (U.S. TV series), WCVB-TV and OZY Media for the love of Community Radio displayed in the film.

In July 2016, Chebot was the Executive Producer and Director for OZY Fusion Fest's hour-long broadcast special. The festival took place in Central Park, New York City, and featured music from will.i.am and Wyclef Jean, comedy from Abbi Jacobson and Ilana Glazer, and conversations with Malcolm Gladwell, Cory Booker, and Karl Rove. The festival was a partnership between OZY Media and Fusion, airing on Fusion Networks in August 2016. OZY's Carlos Watson also produced and hosted the project.

From 2017 to early 2018, Chebot executive produced and directed 8 half-hour episodes of the PBS primetime documentary series “Breaking Big,” featuring Daily Show host Trevor Noah, former pro football star and TV personality Michael Strahan, country music artist Jason Aldean, actor and playwright Danai Gurira, author Roxane Gay, chef and author Eddie Huang, indoor cycling entrepreneur Ruth Zukerman, and fashion designer Christian Siriano. The series which explores the unlikely twists and turns on the road to success premiered in June, 2018.

Chebot has directed music videos for country artists Restless Heart, Robert Ellis Orrall, and Ronna Reeves.

== Directorial biography ==
- Blakey’s Message, an intimate portrait of Jazz legend, Art Blakey (1981)
- AIDS Buddies: Friends for Life (1986)
- Second Chance (1987)
- Robert Ellis Orrall, A Little Bit of Her Love (1993)
- Robert Ellis Orrall, Every Day When I Get Home (1993)
- Ronna Reeves, Never Let Him See Me Cry (1993)
- Restless Heart, Baby Needs New Shoes (1994)
- Song for New Orleans (2006)
- Conversations with Carlos Watson (2007)
- 1 In 100 Million, a Salute to the American Workforce Series (2014-2015)
- Outermost Radio (2015)
- OZY Fusion Fest (2016)
- Breaking Big (2018)

== Awards and honors ==
- Second Chance, WBZ-TV, New England Emmy Award Winner (1987)
- Song for New Orleans, Golden Telly Award Winner (2006)
- Conversations with Carlos Watson, Emmy Award Winner (2007)
- Outermost Radio, Provincetown International Film Festival Selection (2015)
- Outermost Radio, Kansas International Film Festival Selection (2015)
- Outermost Radio, The John Schlesinger Award Winner (2015)
- Outermost Radio, The Spotlight Documentary Film Awards Silver Award Winner (2015)
- Outermost Radio, Best Director, Documentary, Idyllwild International Festival of Cinema (2016)
- 1 in 100 Million, Platinum Remi Award, Best Web Series, WorldFest Houston (2016)
- Outermost Radio, Gold Remi Award, Independent Documentary, WorldFest Houston (2016)
- 1 in 100 Million, Bronze Telly Award, Documentary, (2016)
- 1 in 100 Million, Bronze Telly Award, Web Series (2016)
- 1 in 100 Million: Paul Francis Found His Rhythm, New England Emmy Award Winner (2017)
- Outermost Radio, Outstanding Documentary, New England Emmy Award Winner (2017)
- My Wish, Outstanding Public Service Announcement, New England Emmy Award Winner (2018)
- My Wish, Hatch Awards Bronze Winner (2018)
