= Somerset Berkley Regional High School =

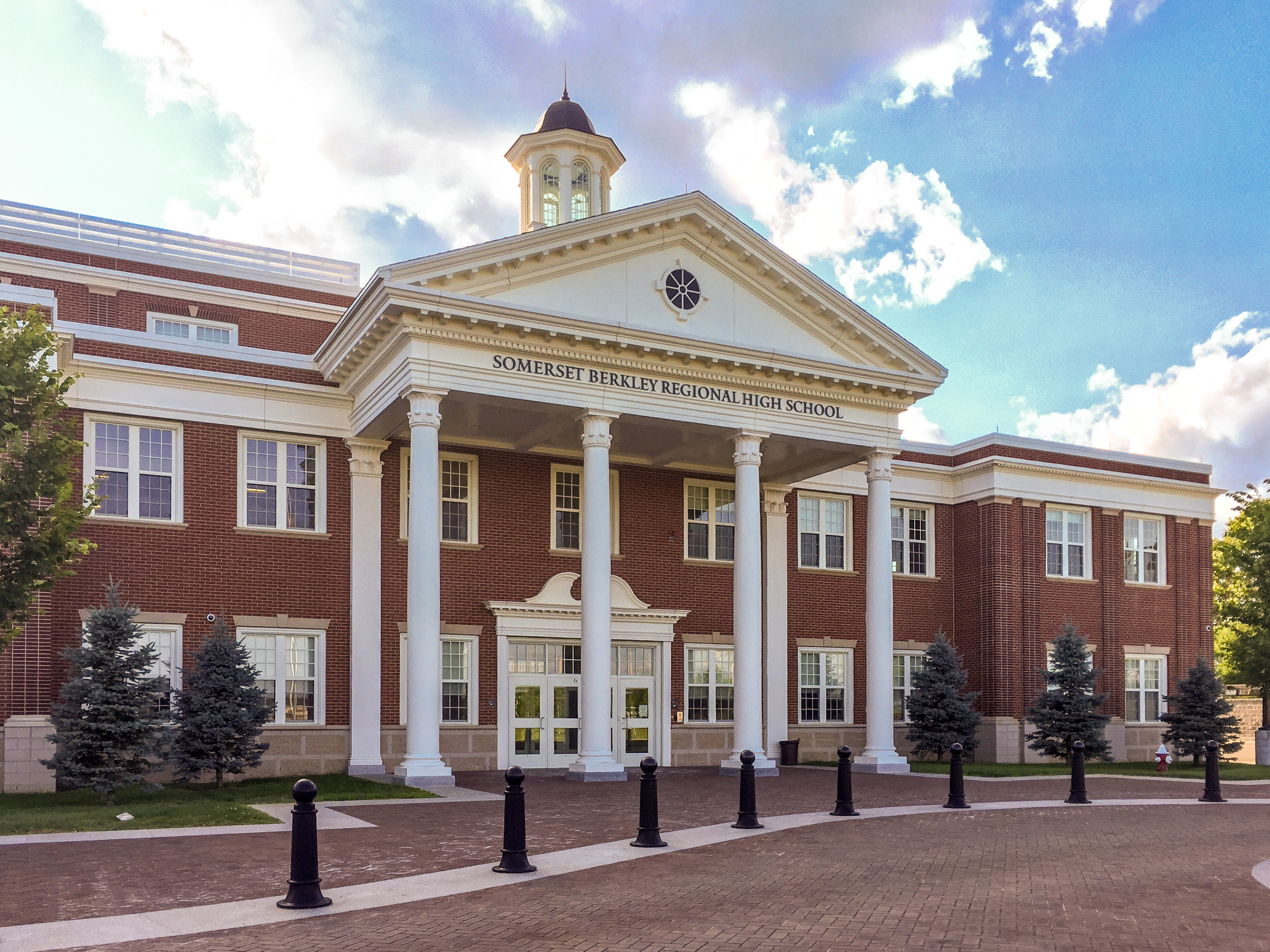
- New Somerset Berkley RHS building, built 2014

Location
- 625 County Street; Somerset, Massachusetts 02726; United States; 41°44′33″N 71°8′55″W

Information
- Type: Public high school Open enrollment
- Motto: Carpe diem
- Opened: 1937 (Former building), 2014 (Current building)
- School district: Somerset Berkley Regional School District
- Superintendent: Jeff Schoonover
- Principal: Susan Brelsford
- Staff: 77.25 (FTE)
- Grades: 9–12
- Enrollment: 896 (2024–2025)
- Student to teacher ratio: 11.60
- Colours: Navy; White
- Athletics: MIAA, Division 3
- Athletics conference: South Coast Conference
- Team name: Blue Raider
- Rival: Joseph Case High School (Swansea, MA)
- Accreditation: New England Association of Schools and Colleges
- Newspaper: The Breeze
- Yearbook: The Raider
- Budget: $15,043,900 total $15,520 per pupil (2016)
- Communities served: Berkley, Somerset
- Website: https://www.somersetberkley.org/

Somerset Berkley Regional High School is the public high school for the towns of Somerset and Berkley, Massachusetts, United States, beginning in September 2011.

== Academics ==
Somerset Berkley Regional High School possesses departments of Art, Business Technology, English Language Arts and Reading, Engineering Technology, Foreign Languages, Health, Family & Consumer Sciences, Mathematics, Music, Physical Education, Science, Social Studies, and Special Education.

Students score well above the state average score for Advanced/Above Proficient knowledge in each section of the Massachusetts Comprehensive Assessment System exams.

The school offers Advanced Placement courses in Studio Art, English Language & Composition, English Literature & Composition, European History, United States History, World History, Psychology, Calculus, Biology, Chemistry, and Physics. Students may also take other Advanced Placement courses online. A majority of students receive passing scores on Advanced Placement exams in every subject offered.

In 2008–2009, Somerset High School's (now Somerset Berkley) SAT averages were 504 in Reading, 488 in Writing, and 519 in Mathematics.

== Athletics ==
Somerset Berkley Regional High School competes in Division Two of the Massachusetts Interscholastic Athletic Association. Current sports include: Baseball, Boys & Girls Basketball, Cheerleading, Boys & Girls Cross Country, Field Hockey, Football, Golf, Gymnastics, Ice Hockey, Boys & Girls Soccer, Softball, Boys & Girls Spring & Winter Track, Boys & Girls Tennis, Volleyball, & Wrestling.

Teams are fielded at the Varsity, Junior Varsity, or Freshmen levels, depending on the sport.

Most teams compete in the South Coast Conference (SCC), which also includes Apponequet Regional High School, Bourne High School, Dighton-Rehoboth Regional High School, Fairhaven High School, Greater New Bedford Regional Vocational Technical High School, Joseph Case High School, Old Rochester Regional High School, Seekonk High School, and Wareham High School.

The school's traditional athletic rivals are the Cardinals of Joseph Case High School in Swansea, Massachusetts. The annual Thanksgiving Day football game between Somerset and Swansea is a local tradition. However, this tradition was ended after the 2023 season, and Somerset-Berkley now plays Central High School of Providence, Rhode Island for their Thanksgiving Day game.

== Music ==
The Somerset Music Department became notable under the direction and leadership of Dr. Robert Perry in the late 1960s. At that time the town acquired its "Musictown" nickname. Musical groups at that time consisted of marching band, concert band, orchestra, chorus, glee club, show group, women's chorus, and string ensemble. The annual Musictown celebration also began in the 1960s. It consists of a Kiddies Day (when the kids come march with the marching band), a King and Queen Judging Day, Concert Night, a Pops Night, a Musictown Ball, and a Musictown Festival Grand Day that takes place on the last day. The final day starts with field show presentations by the invited bands and the Somerset Blue Raider Marching Band and a parade that commences at 2:00 PM and lasts approximately 3–8 hours. As of 2008, the Musictown Festival consisted of the King and Queen judging Day, the Musictown Ball, the Kiddies Day, the Pops Night, the Concert Night, and the Grand Day. Every five years Somerset invites Somerset High School alumni and alumnae to perform with the current students in various music groups. This last occurred in 2023.

The music department at Somerset High School now contains concert band, symphonic band, orchestra, string ensemble, concert choir, treble choir, 'Blue Raider' marching band, winter percussion ensemble, winter guard, jazz band, chorale, and the 'Electrify' show choir. Most of these groups have been within the department for many years.

Under new director David Marshall, the 'Blue Raider' marching band made its return as a competing group in the Fall of 2007 with their field show of 'Wicked.' The group doubled in size in one year to about 60 members and traveled to Allentown, Pennsylvania, in November 2008, to compete in the USSBA Northeastern Championships. It received the title of Best Percussion in the 2A division and also won 3rd best color guard and 4th best music. The group tied for 5th overall in the division. The band also competes in the NESBA circuit of shows. In 2008–2009 it performed 'King Kong' and 'Hydrodynamics.' The following academic year it staged 'Heartbeat' and captured 2nd place with a score of 91.7, breaking the 90 mark for the first time since becoming an ensemble.

Tim Sepe instituted the Winter Percussion ensemble in 2007. Student members practice with percussion instruments such as xylophones, marimbas, vibraphones, drums, and other auxiliary percussion equipment with added guitar, bass, and keyboard parts. The 2007 group was a concert percussion group and played jazz classics such as 'Take the A Train' and 'Conga.' Matt Cavanaugh headed the 2008–2009 season, when the group transitioned to an indoor marching ensemble. It performed the show 'The Pursuit' and competed on the NESBA circuit during the winter of 2008 through 2009.

The 'Electrify' show choir was formed in the 2004–2005 year by Micheal Winslow. The group travels as a singing and dancing group much like the show group that was part of the department many years ago. As there is no established circuit, the group travels to many area schools and performs in competition. It even hosts its own show dubbed the 'New England Show Choir Classic.' Although currently headed by David Weeks and Samuel Bianco, Electrify garnered several plaques and trophies during the 2008–2009 season under the leadership of director Richard Sylvia. The pit band, directed by David Marshall, is also a crucial component of Electrify and has won several trophies. Other former directors include: Ramsey Kurdi, Richard Sylvia, and Andrew Arcello.

The current acting Fine & Performing Arts Coordinator is Ira Schaefer. He replaced Lori Anderson after she retired in June 2013. She also directed the Strings groups.

Somerset High School is also home to a drama department which overlaps the choral and band aspects of the music department. Past performances include "Beauty & The Beast" (2016), Into the Woods (2015), Legally Blonde (2012), Guys and Dolls (2004 & 2014), Fiddler on the Roof (2003 & 2011), Jekyll and Hyde (2006), Aida (2005), Little Shop of Horrors (2010), Side Show (2009), West Side Story (2008), and Grease (2007).

The current Music Teachers of SBRHS are Mr. Jeremy Young & Ms. Stephanie Isidoro.

== Regionalization ==
Before 2011, high school students from Berkley attended Somerset High School through a special tuition agreement between the two towns. Under this agreement, the Town of Berkley paid for the right of their students to attend Somerset High School. However, the school was run by the School Committee of the Town of Somerset, in which Berkley residents held no formal representation.

Debate about the creation of a regional high school – in which both Somerset and Berkley residents would be represented – existed for many years. However, the issue gained little political traction until a variety of factors – mainly the lingering end of the tuition agreement and the rapid deterioration of the Somerset High School building – brought the issue to the forefront of political debate in both towns in 2009–2010.

In August 2010, Massachusetts Commissioner of Elementary and Secondary Education Mitchell D. Chester formally approved a regional school district agreement voted on by the two towns that created a regional school district between Berkley and Somerset at the high school level. Under the agreement, each town will pay a share of the school's budget proportional to their percent representation among the student body. Seats on the Somerset Berkley Regional School Committee, which will govern the school, will be divided similarly.

== Buildings ==
=== 1937 building ===
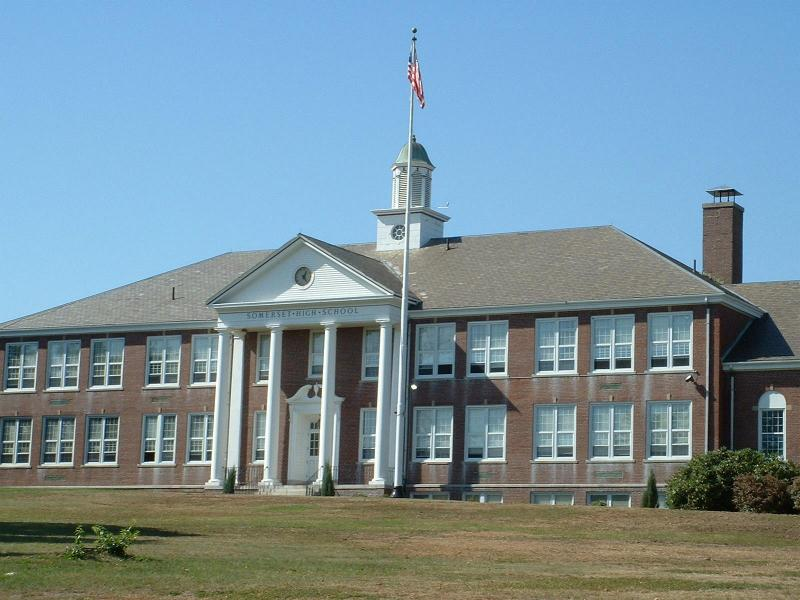
Former Somerset High School building, built 1937, demolished 2014

Construction on the old Somerset High School building was completed in 1937 to a design by Israel T. Almy of Fall River, to replace the original 1885 building that was burned down in 1935.

A 2010 report by the New England Association of Schools and Colleges (NEASC) declared that the physical condition of the current high school building “does not adequately support” educational programs and support services. Difficult conditions in the building include “a lack of adequate space in certain instructional areas”, limited handicapped accessibility, out-of-date fire safety equipment, a small gymnasium space, and poor ventilation. Questions about the structural integrity of the building's foundation led to some areas of the building being condemned during the 2008–2009 school year. The building was originally constructed as a project of the Works Progress Administration, but has since grown considerably with the addition of several new wings over the years.

The Massachusetts School Building Authority (MSBA) offered a significant amount of financial assistance to the Town of Somerset to fund a new high school building should it choose to form a regional high school with Berkley.

Upon completion of the new building in 2017, the 1937 building was demolished and soccer fields built in that location.

=== 2014 building ===
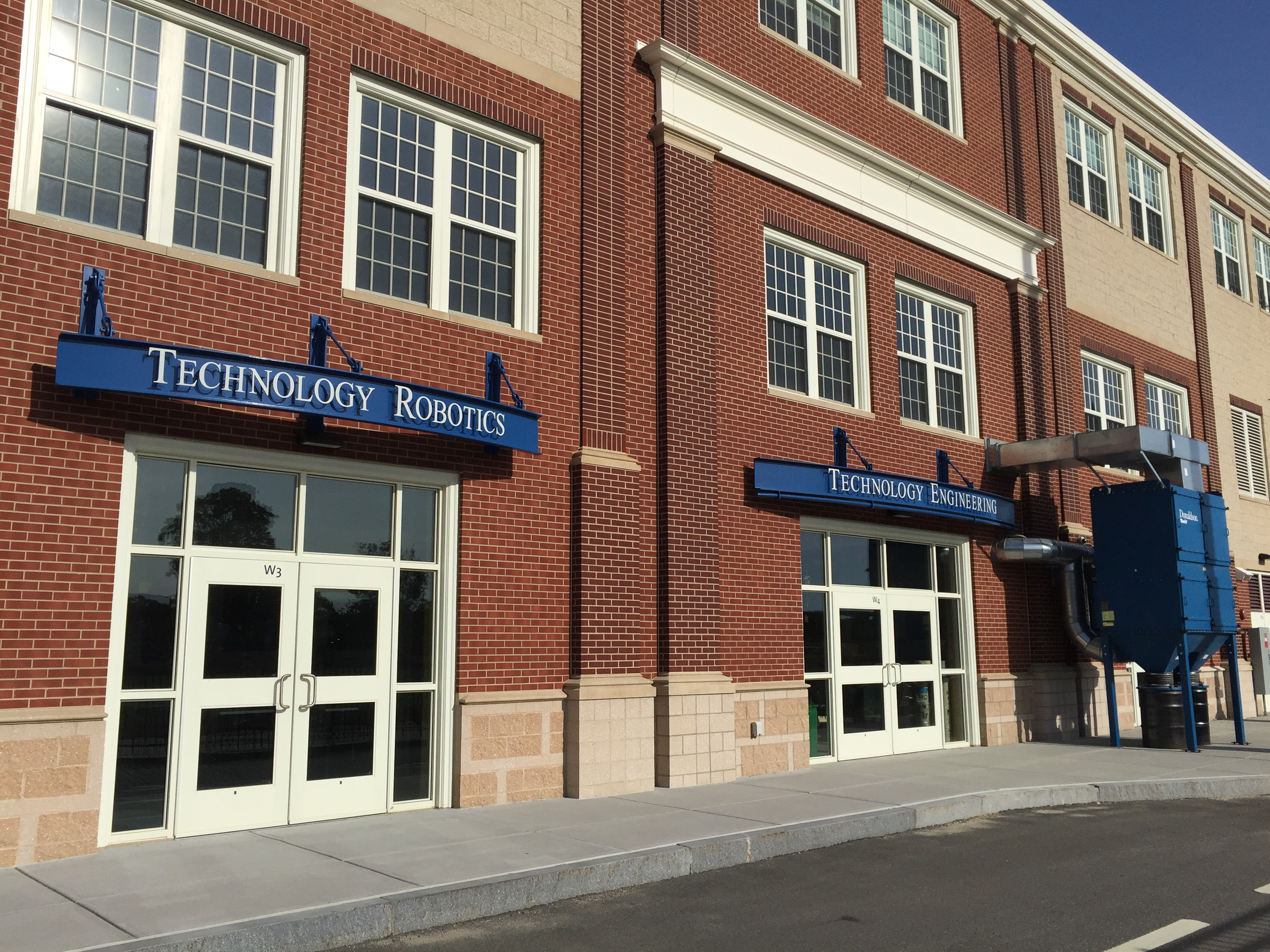
Rear of building, entrances to the robotics lab.

In September 2014, students returned to a brand new, $82.3 million building, constructed immediately adjacent to the old facility. The new "state of the art" building features a modern two-story library with oak paneling, a 70-seat lecture hall with internet and camera outlets, and an 800-seat double-tiered auditorium with a sound system. The cafeteria opens to a concrete patio for eating outdoors. The gym seats 3,200 and has a walnut floor with a four-layer cushioning, and includes hydraulic lifts to move heavy gym mats.

A highlight of the new building is a robotics lab which is used by the school's Engineering Technology Program. In December 2016, students from Somerset Berkley, in collaboration with the Massachusetts Institute of Technology, won first place for industrial design in a competition in Canton, Massachusetts. Students asked the Regional School Committee to secure funds for building a robot competition practice arena in the high school.

== Notable alumni ==
- Craig Albernaz – Manager (baseball) for the Baltimore Orioles
- Alan Chebot – film director and executive producer
- Greg Gagne – former Major League Baseball shortstop
- Tony Gaffney – former professional basketball player
- Nancy Pimental – actress and film and television writer
- Jerry Remy – former Major League Baseball broadcaster and Major League Baseball second baseman
