= Somerset, Massachusetts =

Town in Massachusetts, United States

- Town
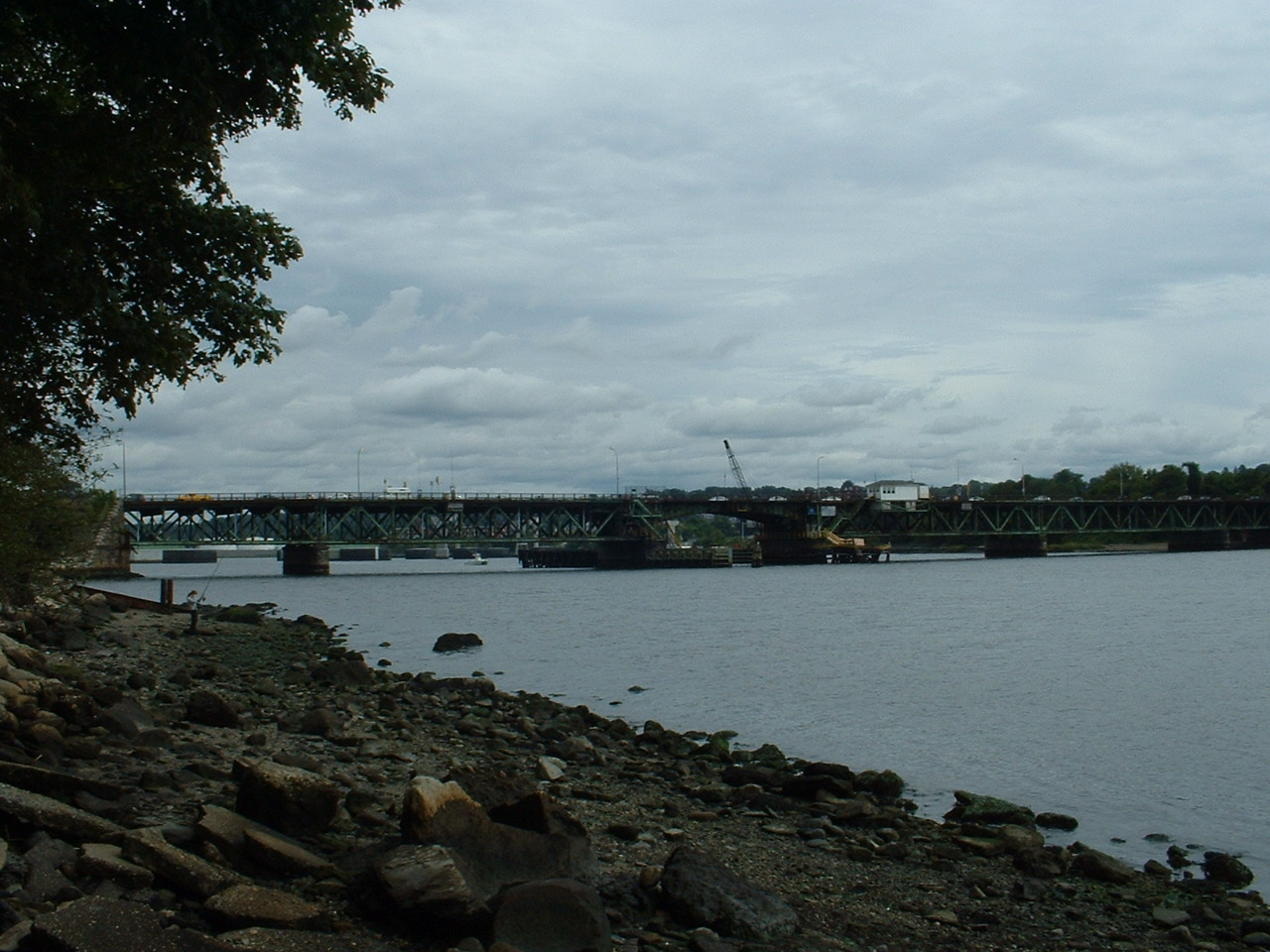
- Brightman Street Bridge, taken from the Somerset side of the Taunton River

- Seal

- Location in Bristol County in Massachusetts
- Coordinates: 41°46′10″N 71°07′45″W
- Country: United States
- State: Massachusetts
- County: Bristol
- Settled: 1677
- Incorporated: 1790

Government
  - Type: Open town meeting

Area
  - Total: 12.0 sq mi (31.0 km^{2})
  - Land: 8.1 sq mi (21.0 km^{2})
  - Water: 3.9 sq mi (10.0 km^{2})
- Elevation: 49 ft (15 m)

Population (2020)
  - Total: 18,303
  - Density: 2,260/sq mi (872/km^{2})
- Time zone: UTC−5 (Eastern)
  - Summer (DST): UTC−4 (Eastern)
- ZIP Codes: 02725, 02726
- Area code: 508/774
- FIPS code: 25-62430
- GNIS feature ID: 0619438
- Website: www.townofsomerset.org

Somerset is a town in Bristol County, Massachusetts, United States. The population was 18,303 at the 2020 census. It is the birthplace and hometown of Clifford Milburn Holland (1883–1924), the chief engineer and namesake of the Holland Tunnel in New York City.

Somerset is a part of the South Coast region of Massachusetts which encompasses the communities that surround Buzzards Bay (excluding the Elizabeth Islands, Bourne and Falmouth), Mount Hope Bay and the Sakonnet River.

== History ==
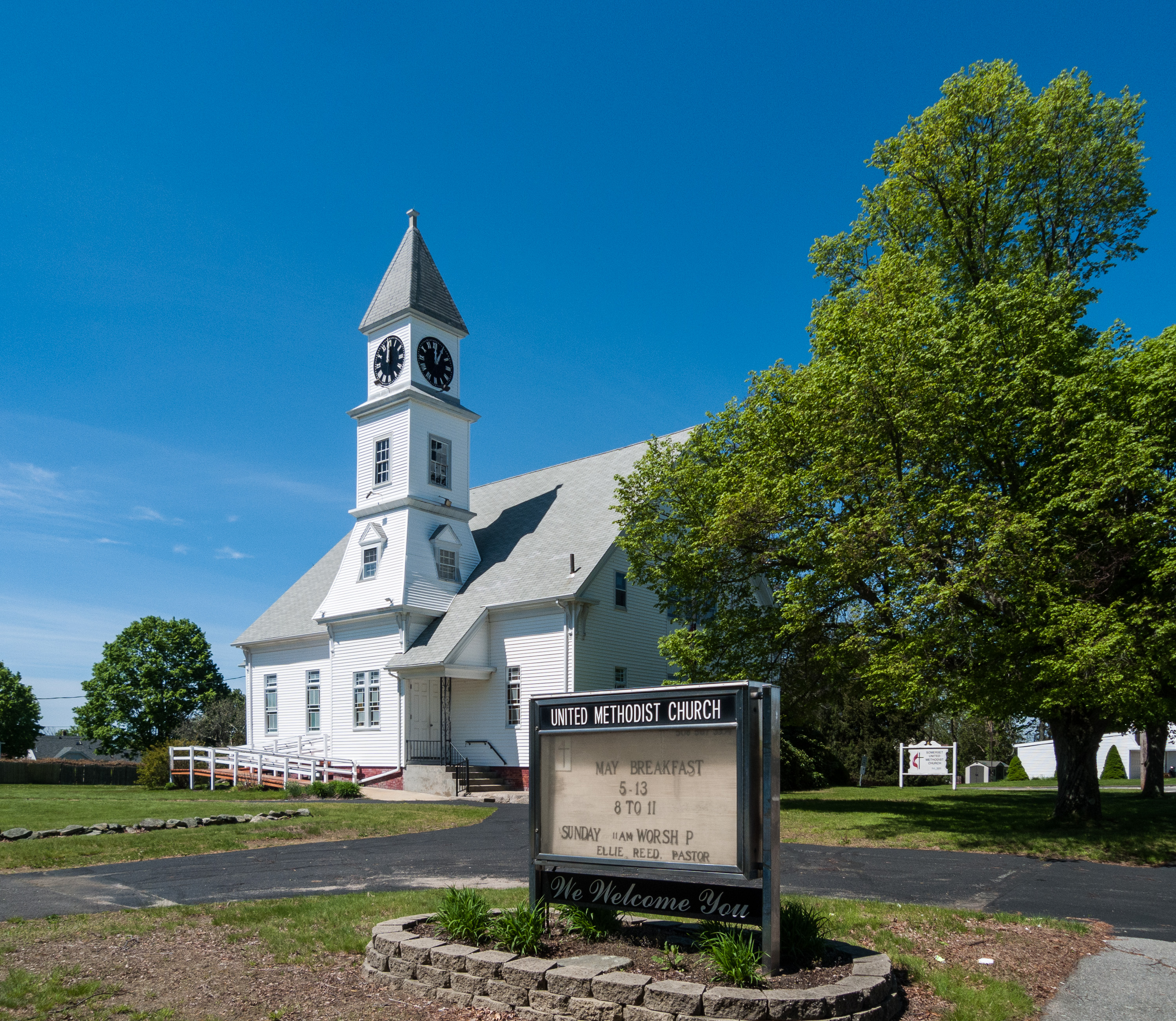
Somerset United Methodist Church

Somerset was first settled in 1677 on the Shawomet lands, and was officially incorporated in 1790. It was named for Somerset Square in Boston, which was, in turn, named for the county of Somerset in England. It was once a vital shipping point, and after the War of 1812 it was one of America's chief distribution points. In 1872, it became the site of a major coal port, and in the early 20th century a large cannery existed in the town. However, as neighboring Fall River's industry grew, it absorbed much of Somerset's, and the town took on more of a suburban character. In fact, the town's population grew during the Great Depression, as many people from Fall River and other localities moved to the suburb. Today, the town's major industry (other than suburban services) is power generation, with the Montaup Electric Company plant upriver (founded in 1923) and the Brayton Point Power Station at the town's southern tip (founded in 1963). Brayton Point has been the target of much criticism for its pollution problems from burning coal. It closed May 31, 2017.

Historically, the town has had a connective relationship with Fall River. Originally, Slade's Ferry ran across the Taunton River to connect the two towns since the late 18th century. In the late 19th century, the Slade's Ferry Bridge connected the two towns, from the current southern terminus of Brayton Avenue in Somerset to Brownell Street in Fall River, and was double-decked, with a railroad section on the top level. The bridge was dismantled after closing in 1970 due to its rapid deterioration and its low height. (The path of the old bridge is still somewhat visible; two large sets of power lines cross the river at the same point.) The Brightman Street Bridge just to the north was opened in 1908. A new bridge, named the Veterans Memorial Bridge, was partially completed prior to a dedication ceremony held on September 11, 2011. At first, only the westbound side of the bridge was open to traffic. Since then, both lanes of the bridge have been opened for traffic.

== Geography ==
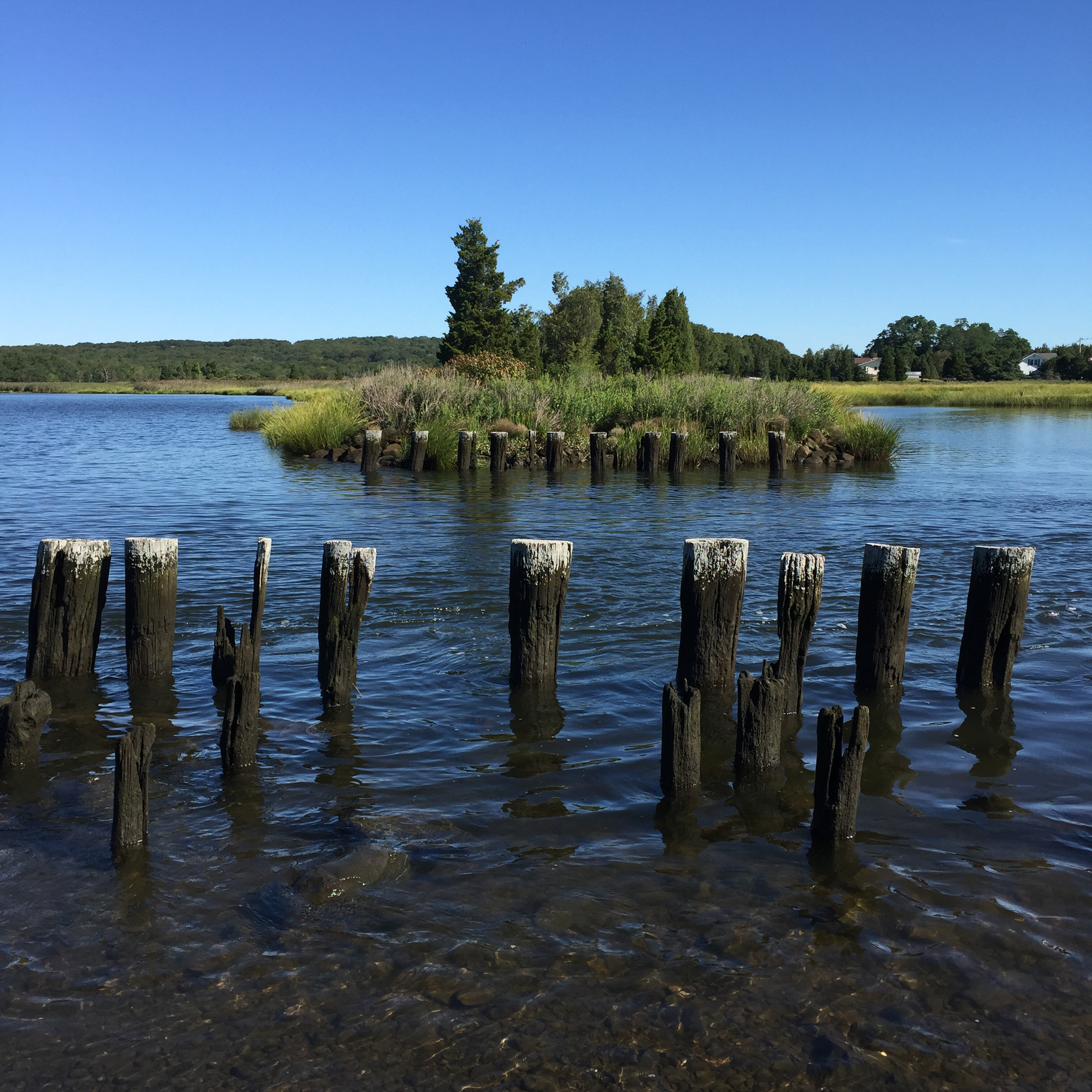
Broad Cove, an inlet of the Taunton River, is located at the northern end of Somerset.

Somerset is located at 41°44′54″N 71°9′11″W (41.748502, −71.153188). According to the United States Census Bureau, the town has a total area of 12.0 square miles (31 km^{2}), of which 8.1 square miles (21 km^{2}) is land and 3.9 square miles (10 km^{2}), or 32.30%, is water. It borders on Mount Hope Bay and Narragansett Bay, and its east border is formed by the Taunton River, an arm of the former bay.

Somerset is bordered by Swansea on the west, Dighton on the north, Fall River on the east (across the Taunton River), and Bristol, Rhode Island, to the south. The border with Bristol is located in the middle of the bay. Cities close to Somerset include Fall River, New Bedford, Attleboro, and Providence, and the town is one hour's drive south of Boston.

The town is accessed via Interstate 195, which enters the town via the Braga Bridge from Fall River and has an exit at Route 103. It is also connected via the Veterans Memorial Bridge, the fourth bridge to cross the Taunton River between the town and city. The Veterans Memorial Bridge carries U.S. Route 6 and Route 138 across the river. Route 6 heads east–west towards Swansea, with several shopping plazas along the route. Route 138 travels north from the bridge along County Street, the town's main north–south thoroughfare, towards Dighton. Route 103's eastern terminus lies at the former intersection of Routes 6 and 138 just south of the new bridge. It heads south-southeast for three-quarters of a mile before turning west-northwest towards Swansea, crossing into that town at a bridge over Lee's River. Due to the controversy in Fall River over the proposed building of an LNG terminal, town officials have consider keeping the old Brightman Street Bridge open, as the tankers would not fit through it, and the terminal's proposed site is upriver of the bridges. However, as of the opening of the new bridge, the bridge is closed, as the old roads leading to it on the Fall River side have been removed to make way for the new bridge's ramp system.

Somerset has bus service along Route 6 provided by the Southeastern Regional Transit Authority (SRTA). The nearest regional bus service is in Fall River, as is MBTA Commuter Rail service at Fall River station. The town's nearest regional airport is in New Bedford, 18 miles (29 km) away. Until the late 1990s, the nearest airport was in Fall River; however, the airport closed due to various issues. The nearest national airport is T. F. Green Airport in Rhode Island, 27 miles (43 km) away. The nearest international airport is Logan International Airport, 55 miles (89 km) away in Boston.

== Demographics ==
Historical population
Year	Pop.	±%
1790	1,151	—
1850	1,166	+1.3%
1860	1,793	+53.8%
1870	1,776	−0.9%
1880	2,006	+13.0%
1890	2,106	+5.0%
1900	2,241	+6.4%
1910	2,798	+24.9%
1920	3,520	+25.8%
1930	5,398	+53.4%
1940	5,873	+8.8%
1950	8,566	+45.9%
1960	12,196	+42.4%
1970	18,088	+48.3%
1980	18,813	+4.0%
1990	17,655	−6.2%
2000	18,234	+3.3%
2010	18,165	−0.4%
2020	18,303	+0.8%
2024*	18,375	+0.4%
* = population estimate. Source: United States census records and Population Estimates Program data.

As of the census of 2020, there were 18,303 people and 7,352 households residing in the town. The population density was 2,310.0 inhabitants per square mile (891.9/km^{2}). There were 7,448 housing units in the town. The racial makeup of the town was 92.64% White, 0.86% Black or African American, 0.26% Native American, 1.20% Asian, 0.02% Pacific Islander, 0.96% from other races, and 4.07% from two or more races. Hispanic or Latino of any race were 2.37% of the population.

There were 7,352 households, out of which 30.0% had children under the age of 18 living with them, 57.2% were married couples living together, 23.7% had a female householder with no spouse present, and 12.1% had a male householder with no spouse present. Of all households, 8.4% were made up of individuals, and 3.2% had someone living alone who was 65 years of age or older. The average household size was 2.45 and the average family size was 2.89.

In the town, the population was spread out, with 19.2% under the age of 18, 4.8% from 18 to 24, 22.7% from 25 to 44, 28.4% from 45 to 64, and 24.8% who were 65 years of age or older. The median age was 47 years.

The median income for a household in the town was $111,720, and the median income for a family was $127,132. The per capita income for the town was $56,284. About 5.0% of the population were below the poverty line, including 7.0% of those under age 18 and 5.9% of those age 65 or over.

== Government ==
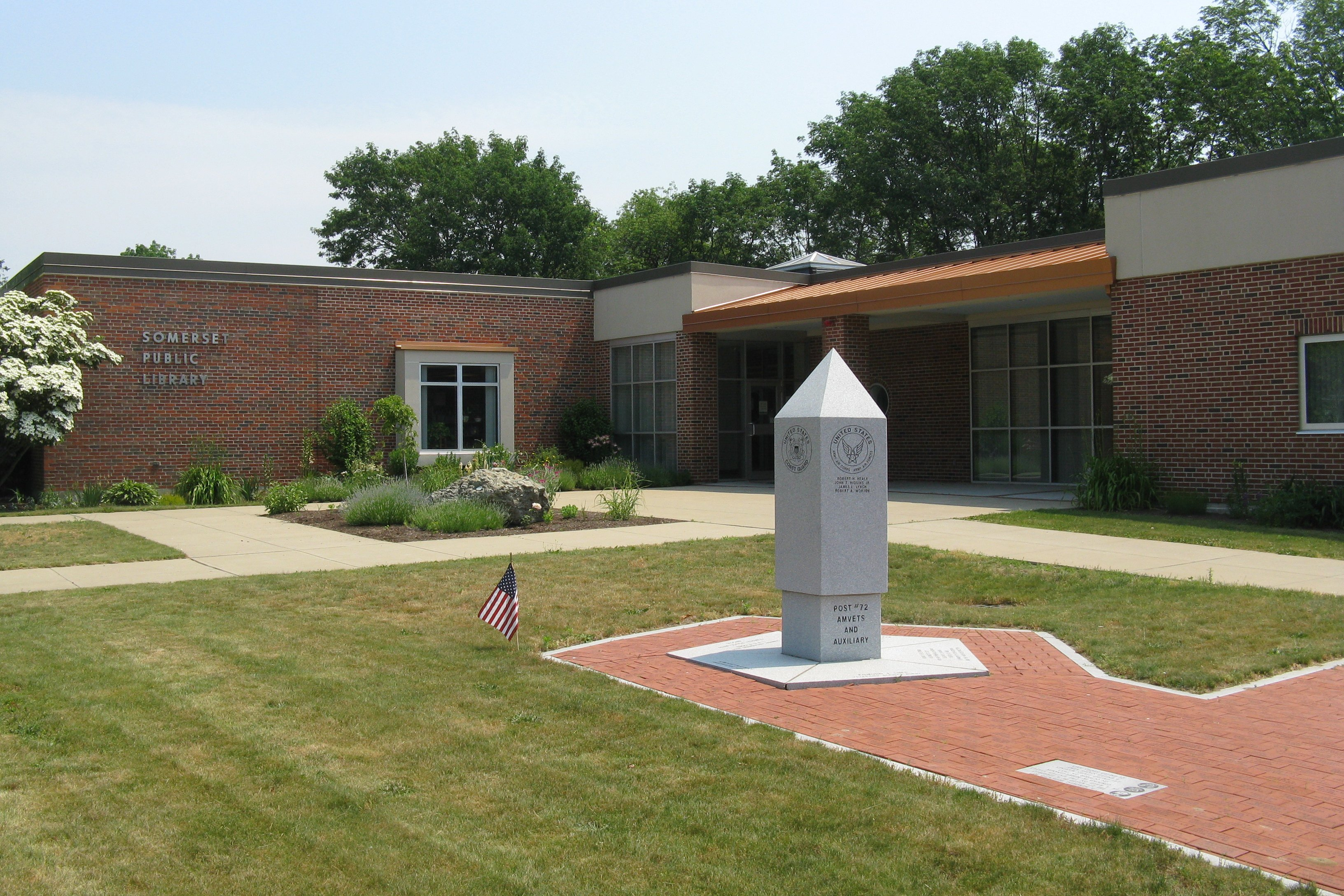
Somerset Public Library

On the state level, Somerset is represented as part of the Fifth Bristol state representative district, which includes Dighton and parts of Swansea and Taunton. In the state senate, Somerset is part of the First Bristol and Plymouth district, which includes Fall River, Freetown, Lakeville, Rochester, Swansea and Westport. Representative Patricia Haddad (D-Somerset) represents Somerset in the State House of Representatives. Senator Michael Rodrigues (D-Westport) represents Somerset in the state senate. On the national level, the town is part of Massachusetts's 4th congressional district, which is represented by Jake Auchincloss. The state's senior Senator is Elizabeth Warren. The state's junior Senator is Ed Markey.

The town's library is located north of the town hall in the center of town, and was expanded for more resource and meeting areas in 2000. The town's historical society is located in the north end of town, and also operates a museum in that location (in the former Village School building). The old Town Hall, to the north of the library, is still in use for various public gatherings. The town is served by one centralized police and fire headquarters, along with a smaller branch fire station in the Brayton Point area which is also trained to handle emergencies at the Brayton Point Power Plant. The town's zip codes are 02725 and 02726, although both are now located in the central post office in the heart of town. The town maintains five parks (Buffington Park, Ashton Field, Waterfront Park, Rock Park, and South Complex Baseball/softball fields), as well as a town beach, Pierce Beach, located next to Pierce Playground along the Taunton River in the north end of town. A sixth park, Slade's Ferry Park, was closed by eminent domain for the right-of-way of the new Brightman Street Bridge being built.

Somerset presidential election results
Year	Democratic	Republican	Third parties	Total Votes	Margin
2024	47.30% 5,199	51.20% 5,629	1.40% 155	10,983	3.90%
2020	52.28% 5,815	45.97% 5,113	1.74% 194	11,122	6.31%
2016	49.12% 4,901	45.77% 4,566	5.11% 510	9,977	3.36%
2012	61.40% 6,134	37.01% 3,697	1.59% 159	9,990	24.39%
2008	63.12% 6,368	35.06% 3,537	1.81% 183	10,088	28.06%
2004	67.23% 6,769	31.93% 3,215	0.84% 85	10,069	35.30%
2000	67.91% 6,384	26.61% 2,501	5.48% 515	9,400	41.31%
1996	66.52% 6,091	22.49% 2,059	10.99% 1,006	9,156	44.04%
1992	52.26% 5,155	24.25% 2,392	23.50% 2,318	9,865	28.01%
1988	60.22% 5,677	38.97% 3,674	0.81% 76	9,427	21.25%
1984	52.30% 4,864	47.31% 4,400	0.40% 37	9,301	4.99%
1980	46.40% 4,287	38.20% 3,529	15.40% 1,423	9,239	8.20%
1976	61.92% 5,915	35.88% 3,427	2.20% 210	9,552	26.05%
1972	51.66% 4,545	48.02% 4,225	0.32% 28	8,798	3.64%
1968	65.21% 5,085	31.66% 2,469	3.13% 244	7,798	33.55%
1964	79.76% 5,710	20.04% 1,435	0.20% 14	7,159	59.72%
1960	65.95% 4,231	33.73% 2,164	0.31% 20	6,415	32.22%
1956	39.68% 2,185	60.18% 3,314	0.15% 8	5,507	20.50%
1952	41.94% 2,032	57.89% 2,805	0.17% 8	4,845	15.95%
1948	53.17% 1,746	46.01% 1,511	0.82% 27	3,284	7.16%
1944	49.63% 1,401	50.23% 1,418	0.14% 4	2,823	0.60%
1940	51.52% 1,392	48.19% 1,302	0.30% 8	2,702	3.33%

== Education ==
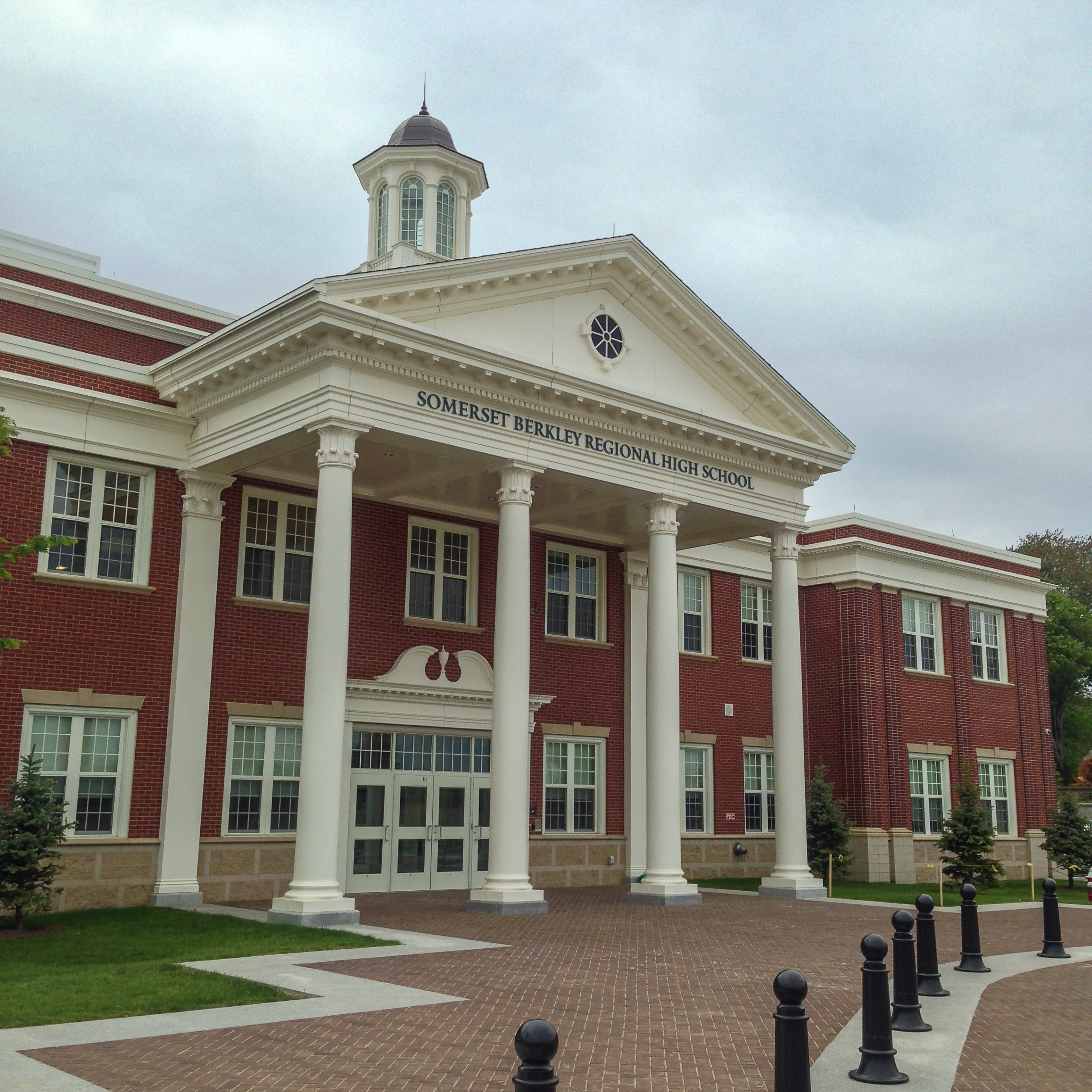
Somerset Berkley Regional High School

Somerset is served by its own public school system. It has three elementary schools, from north to south they are the North Elementary School, the Chace Street School, and the South Elementary School. A fourth elementary school, Wilbur Elementary School, closed in June 2014 following a majority vote by the school board. Somerset Middle School (formerly known as Somerset Junior High School) is located adjacent to South Elementary along Brayton Avenue, and handles grades 6 through 8. Somerset Berkley Regional High School is located along County Street (Route 138). The school's mascot is the "Blue Raider", and its colors are dark blue and white. The school is known locally for having two former baseball players play professionally, Greg Gagne and Jerry Remy. The town is a member of the Diman Regional Vocational Technical High School system in Fall River, and high school students may also attend Bristol County Agricultural High School in Dighton.

Many students of all grades attend private schools in Fall River, including Bishop Connolly High School. There are no private schools in the town.

The new (and renamed) regional school opened in late August 2014. Projected costs for the new Somerset-Berkley Regional High School are now at $81.5 million to $83.8 million, notably higher than earlier estimates after planners found that more costs than they had believed would not be reimbursed by the state. The school was built just behind the old high school, atop the former location of the soccer fields and tennis courts. The football field and running track were completely refurbished and completed before the start of the school year. The first graduating class will be the class of 2015. The original high school building was set to be demolished in late 2014, and on its former site will be a new series of fields for student use.

== Notable people ==
- Craig Albernaz, Major League Baseball manager of the Baltimore Orioles
- Beatrice Arbour, All-American Girls Professional Baseball League player
- Pamela Bustin, 1996 Olympic field hockey player
- Alan Chebot, Television producer and director
- Alice DeCambra, All-American Girls Professional Baseball League player
- Lillian DeCambra, All-American Girls Professional Baseball League player
- Shirley May France, attempted to swim the English Channel in 1949 and 1950
- Greg Gagne, Major League Baseball shortstop for two Minnesota Twins world championship teams
- Clifford Milburn Holland, chief engineer and namesake of the Holland Tunnel in New York City
- Leslie Marshall, journalist
- Rhoda Leonard, All-American Girls Professional Baseball League player
- Nancy Pimental, actress, and screenwriter, who wrote the script for the film The Sweetest Thing
- Stephen Rebello, writer and screenwriter known for such books as Alfred Hitchcock and the Making of Psycho and for the screenplay of Hitchcock, based on that book
- Jerry Remy, Major League Baseball second baseman for the California Angels and Boston Red Sox; longtime Red Sox color commentator for NESN
- Janet L. Robinson, former president and CEO of The New York Times
