= Tournament of Bands =

Competitive band organisation in the United States

- Abbreviation: TOB, TOB/TIA
- Formation: 1972; 54 years ago
- Type: Performing arts organization
- Tax ID no.: 25-1653208
- Legal status: 501(c)(3) organization
- Purpose: Provide a tradition of performance opportunities in the musical and visual arts
- Location: United States
- Members: 439 bands (2022)
- Tournament Director: Justin Smith
- NJA Judges Coordinator: Kevin Wrightstone
- NJA Director: Timothy Kondziela
- Parent organization: National Judges Association (NJA); Tournament of Bands Music Festival Inc
- Revenue: ▲US$1.2 million (2024)
- Expenses: ▲US$1 million (2024)
- Website: njatob.org

The Tournament of Bands (TOB), also known as Tournament Indoor Association (TOB/TIA), is an American school band association and governing body that sanctions marching band, color guard, and drumline, competitions in the Mid-Atlantic and Northeastern United States. The "tournament of bands", or "tournament indoor", culminates in regional championships, or Chapter Championships, followed by the Atlantic Coast Championships (ACC), every November and May.

Founded in 1972 by the National Judges Association (NJA), TOB is composed of 439 member bands organized into eleven regions or chapters. It provides a large array of competitive performance opportunities including marching band, indoor guard, majorette, percussion, and dance teams. TOB/TIA sanctions approximately 150 marching band events and more than 100 indoor events every year.

== Membership ==
Membership is open to any elementary, middle, junior, or senior high school, as well as any college or university. An independent unit may join if certain criteria are met such as unit size and age of members. As of 2023, membership are organized into eleven regions, or Chapters, across 9 states.

Number of members by state are:

- Delaware: 22
- Maryland: 70
- New Jersey: 61
- New York: 4
- North Carolina: 3
- Ohio: 4
- Pennsylvania: 225
- Virginia: 27
- West Virginia: 24

== Marching band ==
The Tournament of Bands sanctions about 140 marching band competitions throughout each fall, corresponding roughly with high school football season. Bands are judged on a 100-point linear scale by judges both on the field and in the press box. Bands are also divided into groups based on their size, and judged only within their group. Sizes are as follows:

Group	Musicians	Auxiliary
1	Up to 30	30
2	31 – 50	50
3	51 – 75	75
4	76 or more	

In addition to the group sizes, there are three levels of performance classification that a member may elect to participate:

Open Class (formerly Championship) – Highest level of competition, intended for experienced bands.

A Class (formerly Regional and Invitational) – Intended for young bands prepared to compete at the regional or state-level.

Festival Class – Intended for young and developing bands. No scores are given for this class, only ratings.

Every class and group combination is available at all TOB-sanctioned events and Chapter Championships, or regional championships. Festival Class is not available at the annual Atlantic Coast Championships, only Open and A Class.

== Indoor activities ==
The Tournament Indoor Association (TIA) is one of several circuits for indoor shows in the mid-Atlantic states (other circuits include MAIN, Cavalcade, KIDA, and TRWEA). TIA sanctions competitions for indoor guard, marching percussion, concert percussion, twirlers, and dance team units. The indoor season generally runs from late January to the first weekend in May. Units can be either scholastic or independent. Scholastic units are affiliated with a school. Independent units are usually not affiliated with a school. Classifications are as follows:

- Scholastic Elementary/Independent Cadet – For elementary school students or students under the age of 10.
- Scholastic Middle/Independent Junior – For students in middle school or up to the age of 14.
- Novice A – For color guards only
- Novice – For percussion, dance teams and twirlers
- Intermediate A – for color guards and percussion
- A class
- Open class
- World class
- University – All members must be students at the university and not over the age of 22. Judged on Open class sheets.
- Senior – All members must be 23 or older. Judged on open class sheets.

Units are divided into 11 chapters based on geography. Any unit which has participated in one contest throughout the season is eligible to participate in their respective Chapter Championships, which are usually held the last weekend in April, although in order to be a chapter champion, you must compete in two shows. Any unit which has participated in 4 contests throughout the season and Chapter Championships can compete in the Atlantic Coast Championships, which are held the first weekend in May in Wildwood, NJ. Depending on the number of groups competing in a single class, the tournament can have multiple rounds in which the higher scoring groups advance.

== Atlantic Coast Championships ==
=== Open Class (1973–present) ===
Below is a list of past marching band champions organized by group. Championships are counted by group.

Year	Group 1	Group 2	Group 3	—
1973 (1st)	Catasauqua (Pennsylvania)	Salisbury (Pennsylvania)	Archbishop Wood (Pennsylvania)	
1974 (2nd)	Catasauqua ^{(2)}	Thomas McKean (Delaware)	Hammonton (New Jersey)	
1975 (3rd)	Penns Grove (New Jersey)	Salisbury ^{(2)}	Hammonton ^{(2)}	
1976 (4th)	Catasauqua ^{(3)}	Penns Grove	Hammonton ^{(3)}	
1977 (5th)	Penns Grove ^{(2)}	Sun Valley (Pennsylvania) (tie); Oakcrest (New Jersey)	Hammonton ^{(4)}	
1978 (6th)	Bald Eagle-Nittany (Pennsylvania)	Upper Merion (Pennsylvania)	Hammonton ^{(5)}	
1979 (7th)	Penns Grove ^{(3)}	Sun Valley ^{(2)}	Hammonton ^{(6)}	
Year	Group 1	Group 2	Group 3	Group 4
1980 (8th)	Jonathan Dayton (New Jersey)	David Brearly (New Jersey)	Sun Valley (Pennsylvania)	Governor Livingston (New Jersey)
1981 (9th)	Eastern Regional (New Jersey)	David Brearly ^{(2)}	Sun Valley ^{(2)}	Williamsport (Pennsylvania)
1982 (10th)	David Brearly (New Jersey)	Northern Highlands (New Jersey)	Elizabeth (New Jersey)	Williamsport ^{(2)}
1983 (11th)	Lock Haven (Pennsylvania)	Steinert (New Jersey)	Hammonton ^{(7)}	Arlington (New York)
1984 (12th)	Boonton (New Jersey)	Steinert ^{(2)}	Lake-Lehman (Pennsylvania)	Williamsport ^{(3)}
1985 (13th)	Bald Eagle-Nittany ^{(2)}	Steinert ^{(3)}	Kearny (New Jersey)	Arlington ^{(2)}
1986 (14th)	Bald Eagle-Nittany ^{(3)}	Middle Township (New Jersey)	Lake-Lehman ^{(2)}	Mount Vernon (Virginia)
1987 (15th)	Steinert (New Jersey)	Lake-Lehman (Pennsylvania)	Lebanon (Pennsylvania)	Williamsport ^{(4)}
1988 (16th)	Governor Livingston (New Jersey)	Lake-Lehman ^{(2)}	Middle Township (New Jersey)	Carlisle (Pennsylvania)
1989 (17th)	Governor Livingston ^{(2)}	Lake-Lehman ^{(3)}	Middle Township ^{(2)}	Williamsport ^{(5)}
1990 (18th)	Governor Livingston ^{(3)}	Lake-Lehman ^{(4)}	Middle Township ^{(3)}	Carlisle ^{(2)}
1991 (19th)	Governor Livingston ^{(4)}	Lake-Lehman ^{(5)}	Brandywine (Delaware)	Carlisle ^{(3)}
1992 (20th)	Governor Livingston ^{(5)}	Lake-Lehman ^{(6)}	Middle Township ^{(4)}	Mechanicsburg (Pennsylvania)
1993 (21st)	Hanover Area (Pennsylvania)	Governor Livingston (New Jersey)	Red Land (Pennsylvania)	Carlisle ^{(4)}
1994 (22nd)	Haddon Heights (New Jersey)	Norristown (Pennsylvania)	Red Land ^{(2)}	Mechanicsburg ^{(2)}
1995 (23rd)	Hanover Area ^{(2)}	Middle Township ^{(2)}	Clearview (New Jersey)	Mechanicsburg ^{(3)}
1996 (24th)	Hanover Area ^{(3)}	Middle Township ^{(3)}	Red Land ^{(3)}	Mechanicsburg ^{(4)}
Year	Open Group 1	Open Group 2	Open Group 3	Open Group 4
1997 (25th)	Governor Livingston ^{(6)}	Middle Township ^{(4)}	Nazareth (Pennsylvania)	Pocono Mountain (Pennsylvania)
1998 (26th)	Henderson (Pennsylvania)	Middle Township ^{(5)}	Absegami (New Jersey)	Pocono Mountain ^{(2)}
1999 (27th)	Pittston (Pennsylvania)	Middle Township ^{(6)}	Mechanicsburg (Pennsylvania)	Pocono Mountain ^{(3)}
2000 (28th)	Henderson ^{(2)}	Middle Township ^{(7)}	Mechanicsburg ^{(2)}	Pocono Mountain ^{(4)}
2001 (29th)	Triton (New Jersey)	Middle Township ^{(8)}	Lancaster Catholic (Pennsylvania)	Pocono Mountain ^{(5)}
2002 (30th)	Henderson ^{(3)}	Middle Township ^{(9)}	Absegami ^{(2)}	Westminster (Maryland)
2003 (31st)	Williamstown (New Jersey)	Middle Township ^{(10)}	Bensalem (Pennsylvania)	Southern Regional (New Jersey)
2004 (32nd)	Henderson ^{(4)}	Pocono Mountain West (Pennsylvania)	Lancaster Catholic ^{(2)}	Southern Regional ^{(2)}
2005 (33rd)	Governor Livingston ^{(7)}	Pocono Mountain West ^{(2)}	Mechanicsburg ^{(3)}	Lancaster Catholic (Pennsylvania) (tie); Southern Regional ^{(3)}
2006 (34th)	Governor Livingston ^{(8)}	Middle Township ^{(11)}	Mechanicsburg ^{(4)}	Spring-Ford (Pennsylvania)
2007 (35th)	Lake-Lehman (Pennsylvania)	Middle Township ^{(12)}	Mechanicsburg ^{(5)}	Spring-Ford ^{(2)}
2008 (36th)	Governor Livingston ^{(9)}	Brick Memorial (New Jersey)	Mechanicsburg ^{(6)}	Spring-Ford ^{(3)}
2009 (37th)	Pittston ^{(2)}	Brick Memorial ^{(2)}	Mechanicsburg ^{(7)}	Daniel Boone (Pennsylvania)
2010 (38th)	Biglerville (Pennsylvania)	Brick Memorial ^{(3)}	West Deptford (New Jersey)	Spring-Ford ^{(4)}
2011 (39th)	Governor Livingston ^{(10)}	Southern Regional (New Jersey)	West Deptford ^{(2)}	Spring-Ford ^{(5)}
2012 (40th)	Governor Livingston ^{(11)}	West Deptford (New Jersey)	Mechanicsburg ^{(8)}	Spring-Ford ^{(6)}
2013 (41st)	Biglerville ^{(2)}	West Deptford ^{(2)}	Southern Regional (New Jersey)	Spring-Ford ^{(7)}
2014 (42nd)	Biglerville ^{(3)}	Deptford Township (New Jersey)	West Deptford ^{(3)}	Spring-Ford ^{(8)}
2015 (43rd)	Biglerville ^{(4)}	West Deptford ^{(3)}	Brick Memorial (New Jersey)	Spring-Ford ^{(9)}
2016 (44th)	Biglerville ^{(5)}	West Deptford ^{(4)}	Brick Memorial ^{(2)}	West Shore (Pennsylvania)
2017 (45th)	Biglerville ^{(6)}	West Deptford ^{(5)}	Southern Regional ^{(2)}	Brick Memorial (New Jersey)
2018 (46th)	Biglerville ^{(7)}	Huntingtown (Maryland)	Liberty (Maryland)	Brick Memorial ^{(2)}
2019 (47th)	Oakcrest (New Jersey)	West Deptford ^{(6)}	Liberty ^{(2)}	Brick Memorial ^{(3)}
2020 (—)	No champions			
2021 (48th)	Allegany (Maryland)	West Deptford ^{(7)}	Brick Memorial ^{(3)}	Cab Calloway (Delaware)
2022 (49th)	Allegany ^{(2)}	Southern Regional ^{(2)}	Brick Memorial ^{(4)}	Cab Calloway ^{(2)}
2023 (50th)	Allegany ^{(3)} (tie); Raritan ^{(1)}	Eastern Regional (New Jersey)	Liberty ^{(3)}	No champion
2024 (51st)	Allegany ^{(4)} (tie); Raritan ^{(2)}	Southern Regional ^{(3)}	Eastern Regional (New Jersey)	Mifflin County (Pennsylvania)
2025 (52nd)	Brick Township (New Jersey)	Southern Regional ^{(4)}	Liberty ^{(4)}	Musselman (West Virginia)

=== Invitational and A Class (1997–present) ===
Below is a list of past Invitational Class and A Class marching band champions organized by group. Championships are counted by group.

Year	Invitational Group 1	Invitational Group 2	Invitational Group 3	Invitational Group 4
1997 (25th)	Nanticoke (Pennsylvania)	Penns Grove (New Jersey)	Avonworth (Pennsylvania)	Shawnee (New Jersey)
1998 (26th)	Penncrest (Pennsylvania)	Abington (Pennsylvania)	Bermudian Springs (Pennsylvania)	No champion
1999 (27th)	Chesapeake (Maryland)	Indian Valley (Pennsylvania)	Emmaus (Pennsylvania)	Linganore (Maryland)
2000 (28th)	Montrose (Pennsylvania)	Williamstown (New Jersey)	East Pennsboro (Pennsylvania)	No champions
2001 (29th)	Gateway (Pennsylvania)	Camp Hill (Pennsylvania)	Ephrata (Pennsylvania)	No champions
2002 (30th)	Highland Regional (New Jersey)	Camp Hill ^{(2)}	Severna Park (Maryland)	No champions
2003 (31st)	Timber Creek Regional (New Jersey)	Parkside (Maryland)	Bloomsburg Area (Pennsylvania)	No champions
2004 (32nd)	Big Spring (Pennsylvania)	Camp Hill ^{(3)}	Aububon (New Jersey)	No champions
2005 (33rd)	Palmerton Area (Pennsylvania)	Aububon	Daniel Boone (Pennsylvania)	No champions
2006 (34th)	North Carroll (Maryland)	Granby (Virginia)	Ephrata ^{(2)}	No champions
2007 (35th)	Brunswick (Maryland)	Hedgesville (West Virginia)	No champion	No champions
2008 (36th)	Catoctin (Maryland)	Big Spring	York (Virginia)	No champions
2009 (37th)	Queen Anne's (Maryland)	Parkland (Pennsylvania)	No champion	No champions
Year	A Group 1	A Group 2	A Group 3	A Group 4
2010 (38th)	Catasauqua (Pennsylvania)	Archbishop Wood (Pennsylvania)	Middletown (Pennsylvania)	No champions
2011 (39th)	Triton (New Jersey)	Timber Creek Regional	Pennsauken (New Jersey)	No champions
2012 (40th)	Cumberland (New Jersey)	Eastern Regional (New Jersey)	Pennsauken ^{(2)}	Central Dauphin (Pennsylvania)
2013 (41st)	Collingswood (New Jersey)	Oakcrest (New Jersey)	Pennsauken ^{(3)}	Central Dauphin ^{(2)}
2014 (42nd)	Perryville (Maryland)	Eastern Regional ^{(2)}	Sparta (New Jersey)	Penncrest (Pennsylvania)
2015 (43rd)	Oakcrest (New Jersey)	Clarke County (Virginia)	Metuchen (New Jersey)	Loudoun County (Virginia)
2016 (44th)	Weehawken (New Jersey)	West Essex (New Jersey)	Middletown ^{(2)}	Toms River North (New Jersey)
2017 (45th)	Pemberton Township (New Jersey)	Winslow Township (New Jersey)	Mountain Ridge (Maryland)	Jackson Liberty (New Jersey)
2018 (46th)	Windber (Pennsylvania)	Oakcrest ^{(2)}	Mifflin County (Pennsylvania)	Kingsway Regional (New Jersey)
2019 (47th)	Southern Garrett (Maryland)	Mainland Regional (New Jersey)	Point Pleasant (New Jersey)	Fort Lee (New Jersey)
2020 (—)	No champions			
2021 (48th)	Winslow Township (New Jersey)	Shawnee	Mifflin County ^{(2)}	Fort Lee ^{(2)}
2022 (49th)	Southern Garrett ^{(2)}	Barnegat (New Jersey)	Fort Hill (Maryland)	Metuchen (New Jersey)
2023 (50th)	Bloomfield (New Jersey)	Odessa (Delaware)	Point Pleasant Borough (New Jersey)	No champion
2024 (51st)	Johnstown (Pennsylvania)	Deptford (New Jersey)	Dubois Area (Pennsylvania)	Fort Hill
2025 (52nd)	Barnegat (New Jersey)	North Bergen (New Jersey)	Mifflin County ^{(3)}	Odessa (Delaware)

== See also ==
- Cavalcade of Bands
- USBands
- Bands of America
