= Johnny Buchanan =

American football player (born 1999)

Profile
- Position: Linebacker

Personal information
- Born: July 25, 1999 (age 27); Brick Township, New Jersey, U.S.
- Listed height: 5 ft 11 in (1.80 m)
- Listed weight: 230 lb (104 kg)

Career information
- High school: Brick Township (NJ); St. John Vianney (NJ)
- College: Delaware (2018–2022)
- NFL draft: 2023: undrafted

Career history
- St. Louis Battlehawks (2024); Birmingham Stallions (2026)*
- * Offseason or practice squad member only

Awards and highlights
- First-team FCS All-American (2022); 3× All-CAA (2020-2022)

Johnny Christian Buchanan (born July 25, 1999) is an American football linebacker. He played college football at Delaware.

== Early life ==
Buchanan was born on July 25, 1999. His father, John, played football at Rutgers, while his cousin Collin Olsen was a running back at FIU; his great uncle, Joe Auer, played in the National Football League (NFL) for the Buffalo Bills, Miami Dolphins and Atlanta Falcons, scoring a touchdown on the first play in the Dolphins' history.

Buchanan grew up in Brick, New Jersey, and played freshman football at Brick Township High School before transferring to St. John Vianney High School. He was a two-way player at St. John Vianney, seeing time at running back and linebacker, and was considered one of their most versatile players. He followed the philosophy used by All-American East Carolina back Scott Harley, called "seek and destroy" – to "punish [the defenders] before they punish you." Buchanan said, "when I played running back, some of the most fun plays were making a quick move and going 70-yards untouched – but something about running through somebody's face is unmatched – so really I had the same mentality on both sides of the ball: make my opponent pay for carrying the ball or trying to tackle me." He studied players such as Ray Lewis, Brian Dawkins, Sean Taylor and Lawrence Taylor to improve his hitting style.

As a junior at St. John Vianney in 2016, Buchanan totaled 140 (Note: Reported as 140 in the Asbury Park Press, 139 on Patch.com, 145 on the University of Delaware website.) tackles, placing eighth in the state, four sacks, two forced fumbles, two recoveries and two interceptions as he helped his school reach the playoff semifinals. He additionally posted 433 rushing yards and 12 total touchdowns (Note: The Delaware website records 500 rushing yards and 13 touchdowns, while the Asbury Park Press reported 433 yards and 12 touchdowns.) on offense, being named first-team All-Shore, second-team All-State, All-Division, and the conference Defensive Player of the Year.

Buchanan was named as a senior first-team All-State, All-Division, first-team All-Shore, All-Metro, the conference Defensive Player of the Year and the Class A Central Defensive Player of the Year. On offense, he posted 1,393 yards off 152 attempts with 17 touchdowns, and defensively he recorded 121 tackles, three sacks and an interception. (Note: The Delaware website lists 1,400 rushing yards and 130 tackles with four sacks, while the Asbury Park Press reported 1,393 rushing yards, 121 tackles and three sacks.) While Buchanan was with St. John Vianney, they compiled an overall record of 31–3 and won the conference championship each year; he was twice their team captain and named their most valuable player.

== College career ==
Buchanan received several offers to play college football, including from FCS teams Monmouth, Elon and Albany, but committed to Delaware after getting their offer on his birthday. He spent his true freshman year, 2018, being mentored by Troy Reeder and Charles Bell while being a backup. He appeared in ten games, none of which he started, and totaled seven tackles and one interception. After both Reeder and Bell graduated in 2019, Buchanan was able to see more action. He appeared in nine games, starting five, and made 47 tackles, additionally returning an interception against Stony Brook 33 yards for the only score of his career.

In the 2020 season, played in spring of 2021 due to the COVID-19 pandemic, Buchanan started all eight games and recorded 42 tackles, placing second on the team, with one sack, helping them qualify for the playoffs. He made at least three tackles in every game and was named first-team All-CAA Football after the season. Buchanan appeared in all 11 games the following season, starting eight while leading the team with 81 tackles, including 5.5 for a loss, in addition to one forced fumble, one fumble recovery and a single interception. After the year, he was selected second-team all-conference.

After the firing of Danny Rocco in 2022, Buchanan entered the NCAA transfer portal, although he later decided to stay at Delaware. In what would be his final season at the school, he totaled 150 tackles, leading the entire FCS, and was named first-team All-CAA as well as to seven All-America teams. He also recorded 1.5 sacks, 8.5 TFLs, and one forced fumble with one recovered, being a finalist for the Buck Buchanan Award for best defensive player in the FCS. Buchanan posted in five games over 15 tackles, including a team record-tying 23 tackles in their win over FBS opponent Navy, for which he was named the national defensive player of the week.

Buchanan declared for the NFL draft following the 2022 season, finishing his stint at Delaware with a total of 326 tackles, including 16.5 for a loss, 2.5 sacks, four pass breakups, three interceptions, and two forced fumbles with two fumble recoveries.

== Professional career ==
Pre-draft measurables
Height	Weight	Arm length	Hand span	40-yard dash	10-yard split	20-yard shuttle	Three-cone drill	Vertical jump	Broad jump	Bench press
5 ft 11 1/3 in (1.81 m)	228 lb (103 kg)	30 3/8 in (0.77 m)	9 in (0.23 m)	4.58 s	1.56 s	4.10 s	7.2 s	40 in (1.02 m)	10 ft 7 in (3.23 m)	22 reps
All values from pro day

Buchanan attended Delaware's pro day, at which he posted a 40-inch vertical jump, a 4.58 40-yard dash and 22 bench press repetitions. Afterwards, he was invited to attend local pro days with the Philadelphia Eagles, New York Giants and New York Jets. He was projected as either a late-round selection in the 2023 NFL draft or a priority undrafted free agent. Buchanan ended up going unselected in the draft. He was afterwards invited to the rookie minicamp of the Pittsburgh Steelers.

=== St. Louis Battlehawks ===
On June 16, 2023, Buchanan was selected by the St. Louis Battlehawks in the XFL's Rookie Draft. He signed a letter of intent on October 18, 2023. He was placed on injured reserve on March 4, 2024.
