= Homophiles of Penn State =

Pennsylvania State University student organization

- Formation: April 20, 1971
- Founded at: Penn State, University Park, Pennsylvania

The Homophiles of Penn State, also known as HOPS, was a student organization founded in 1971 at Pennsylvania State University on the University Park Campus. The club aimed to "change attitudes on homosexuality through legal reform, public education and individual counseling." They wanted to tackle issues on campus, like "lack of information available in the library and classroom, hostile attitudes of the psychiatric clinic and discriminatory administration policies." HOPS planned meeting activities included "speakers, movies, poetry readings, short plays, tapes, etc," as well as "dances and picnics".

== History ==
=== Campus gay scene ===
Before the conception of queer organizations on campus, there were not many places for homosexuals to meet or gather. For those of age, the bar scene was one option, yet most felt that such a location was too public, while some others were simply not interested in such a place. Many wanted a place outside the bar scene to gather.

=== The Free University Organization ===
In the fall of 1970, one such student approached the university chaplain, who pointed him to a discussion group which had met the previous spring. They agreed to meet again, but this time wanted to be more public. They approached The Free University Organization, an organization of students, faculty, and community members, and offered classes which were open to everyone.

They offered a class entitled "Homosexuality: A Growing Subculture", which grew from a handful of attendants to around 50 after a few sessions. It was in these meetings that discussed the need to create a group sanctioned by the university. They then created a steering committee to work on the creation of the club. They submitted their constitution on March 17, 1971, with the name The Other Vision: Homophiles of Penn State. They were granted a charter for the 1971–1972 school year on April 20, 1971.

=== Membership ===
Membership was not limited to Penn State students—people in the surrounding area were encouraged to join the organization. HOPS also welcomed members of all sexualities — they were open to homosexuals and allies alike. They state that the word homophile means "anyone ... who advocates the end of discrimation against homosexuals."

== Charter Controversy ==
=== HOPS' legality questioned ===
Shortly after admittance of the charter, members of the Penn State administration expressed concerns with the admittance of a charter for the group. Vice president for student affairs, Raymond O. Murphy, stated that they wanted to look into the "legalities of this type of organization on a state-related campus." On May 7, 1971, the club's charter was suspended while they could review the legality of the organization.

=== HOPS fights back ===
In February, students of Penn State filed a civil action against the university in Common Pleas Court of Centre County for revoking the charter. It was based on the Civil Rights Acts of 1964 and 1968.

=== Campus support ===
HOPS was not alone in its struggle against the university. They found support across campus. One such place was in the New University Conference, "a group of radical faculty and graduate students". The group condemned the revoking of the charter, stating that it "blatantly violated civil liberties of all Pennsylvanians, especially of students and faculty at University Park."

== Acanfora Case ==
One of the students plaintiffs was Penn State education major Joe Acanfora. During the case, Acanfora was student teaching, and when word got out about both his involvement in the case and his homosexuality, he was removed. He was later reinstated.

=== Campus response ===
Acanfora received support from a variety of sources on campus, one of which was faculty. In the spring of 1972, professor Ursula Mueller quit due to Acanfora's removal. Mueller, assistant professor of mathematics, was the advisor of HOPS. She stated that she was "appalled by the blatant repressive tactics used by the administration in preventing homosexuals from expressing their full humanity."

He also received support from HOPS. In February 1972 they held a rally for Acanfora. Since their charter was still not reinstated at the time, though, the rally had to be formally sponsored by Women's Liberation.

=== News coverage ===
The issue was widely covered in various papers, including campus publications like the Daily Collegian and those belonging to wider areas like The Pennsylvania Mirror. These newspapers followed the issue closely, offering daily updates, rocketing this issue into the spotlight. The club, because of their charter issue and Acanfora's removal, gained publicity and visibility.

== See also ==
- Homophile
- LGBT Social Movements
