= Connor McGovern (American football, born 1997) =

American football player (born 1997)

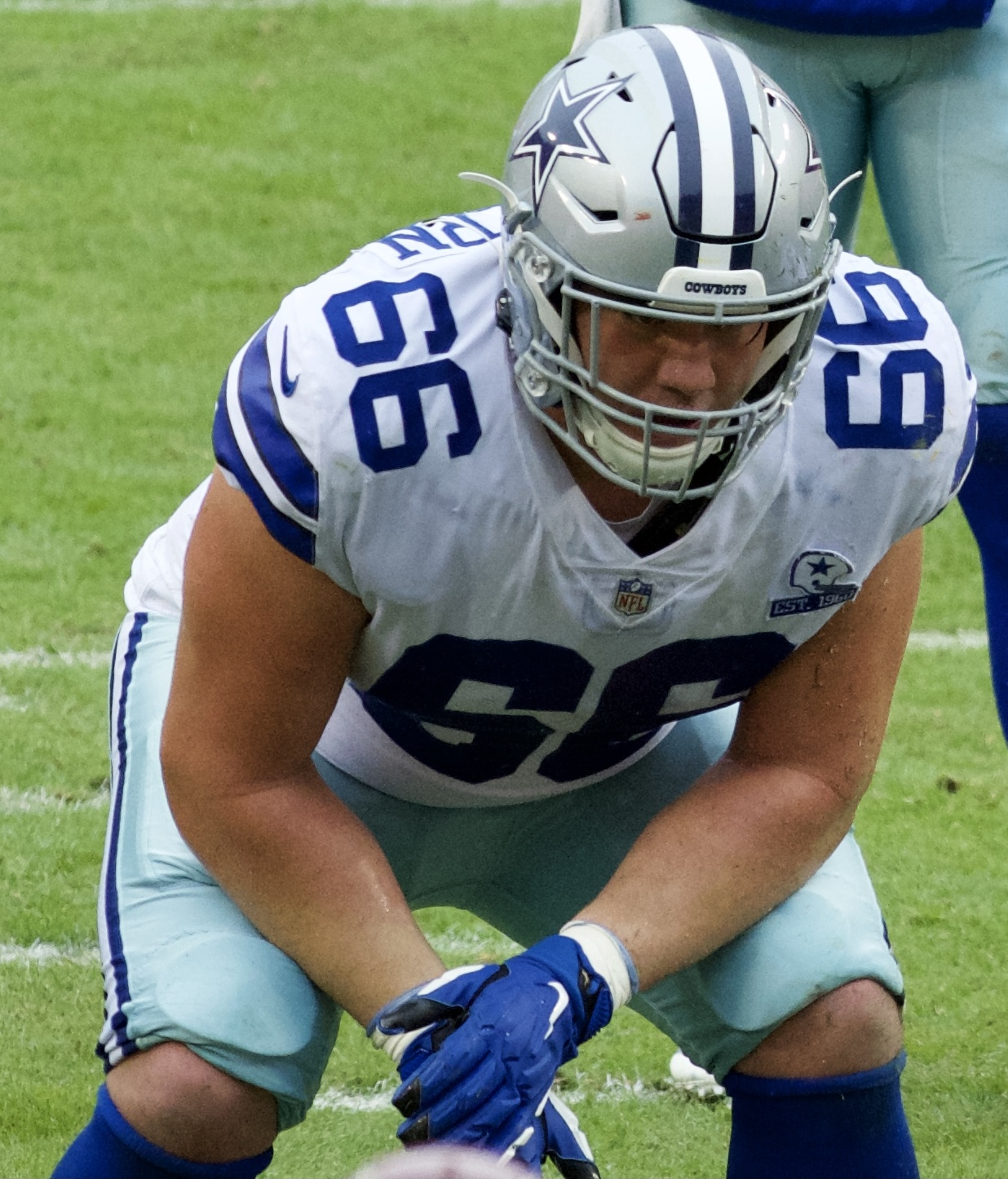
- McGovern with the Dallas Cowboys in 2020

No. 66 – Buffalo Bills
- Position: Center
- Roster status: Active

Personal information
- Born: November 3, 1997 (age 29); Larksville, Pennsylvania, U.S.
- Listed height: 6 ft 5 in (1.96 m)
- Listed weight: 318 lb (144 kg)

Career information
- High school: Lake-Lehman (PA)
- College: Penn State (2016–2018)
- NFL draft: 2019: 3rd round, 90th overall pick

Career history
- Dallas Cowboys (2019–2022); Buffalo Bills (2023–present)

Awards and highlights
- Pro Bowl (2024); Third-team All-Big Ten (2018)

Career NFL statistics as of Week 4, 2026
- Games played: 98
- Games started: 82
- Stats at Pro Football Reference

Connor James McGovern (born November 3, 1997) is an American professional football center for the Buffalo Bills of the National Football League (NFL). He was selected by the Dallas Cowboys in the third round of the 2019 NFL draft. He played college football for the Penn State Nittany Lions.

== Early life ==
McGovern attended Lake-Lehman High School. He received Wyoming Valley Football Conference first-team All-League honors in 2013, 2014 and 2015. He was named the Wyoming Valley Football Conference Most Valuable Player and first-team All-state as a senior.

Also practiced basketball and track. He received All-conference honors in basketball as a junior. He was the District 2 shot put champion as a senior in 2015. He also set school strength records in bench press, power clean, squat and deadlift.

== College career ==
McGovern accepted a football scholarship from Penn State University. As a true freshman, he started nine out of 13 games playing at right guard. He was named the Big Ten Freshman of the week during week 10 of his freshman season, and became the first offensive lineman to receive the honor. He also became the third Big Ten offensive lineman to receive any player of the week award since Penn State joined the conference, after Korey Stringer of Ohio State and Sean Poole of Michigan State.

As a sophomore, McGovern was moved from guard to the center position, starting all 13 games. As a junior, he started 12 games at right guard and one at center.

On January 2, 2019, McGovern announced that he would forgo his final year of eligibility and declare for the 2019 NFL Draft.

== Professional career ==
Pre-draft measurables
Height	Weight	Arm length	Hand span	Wingspan	20-yard shuttle	Three-cone drill	Broad jump	Bench press
6 ft 5 3/8 in (1.97 m)	308 lb (140 kg)	34 1/8 in (0.87 m)	9 7/8 in (0.25 m)	6 ft 10 in (2.08 m)	4.57 s	7.66 s	9 ft 4 in (2.84 m)	28 reps
All values from NFL Combine

=== Dallas Cowboys ===
McGovern was selected by the Dallas Cowboys in the third round (90th overall) of the 2019 NFL draft. He missed all of the preseason with a torn pectoral muscle. He was placed on the injured reserve list on September 1.

In 2020, he began the season as a backup guard behind Zack Martin and Connor Williams. In the sixth game against the Arizona Cardinals, Martin left the game with a concussion after a handful of snaps, and McGovern replaced him at right offensive guard. He would make his first career start in the next game against the Washington Football Team, while Martin recovered. Martin was later moved to right tackle in the tenth game against the Minnesota Vikings to help stabilize the offensive line performance, and McGovern was named the starter at right guard. He would remain in that role for the rest of the season, after Martin suffered a calf injury in the eleventh game against the Washington Football Team. He got his first start at fullback in the regular-season finale against the Philadelphia Eagles, he also played some snaps at guard and on special teams.

In 2021, he started the season opener against the Tampa Bay Buccaneers at right guard in place of Martin, who was placed on the Reserve/COVID-19 list. To get him more involved on game day, although he is a natural guard, he lined up as a fullback and blocking tight end under certain packages from offensive coordinator Kellen Moore. In Week 11 against the Kansas City Chiefs, he was named the starting left guard over Connor Williams, who at the time was leading the league in penalties. He struggled in that game against defensive tackle Chris Jones, who registered 3.5 sacks. Williams regained his starting position in Week 15 against the New York Giants. In the five games that McGovern started at guard (four at left guard and one at right guard), the Cowboys had a 2-3 record.

In 2022, he split time with rookie Tyler Smith, working at left guard with the first-team offense in organized team activities and training camp. He started at center in the third preseason game against the Seattle Seahawks. He was named the starter at left guard for the season opener, after left tackle Tyron Smith was placed on the injured reserve list and the offensive line had to adjust to the loss. He suffered a high ankle sprain seven plays into the game and was replaced with Matt Farniok. He missed the following two games with the injury. In Week 17 against the Tennessee Titans, he started at center in the absence of Tyler Biadasz. He started 15 games, mostly at left guard, while surrendering just two sacks and one penalty.

=== Buffalo Bills ===
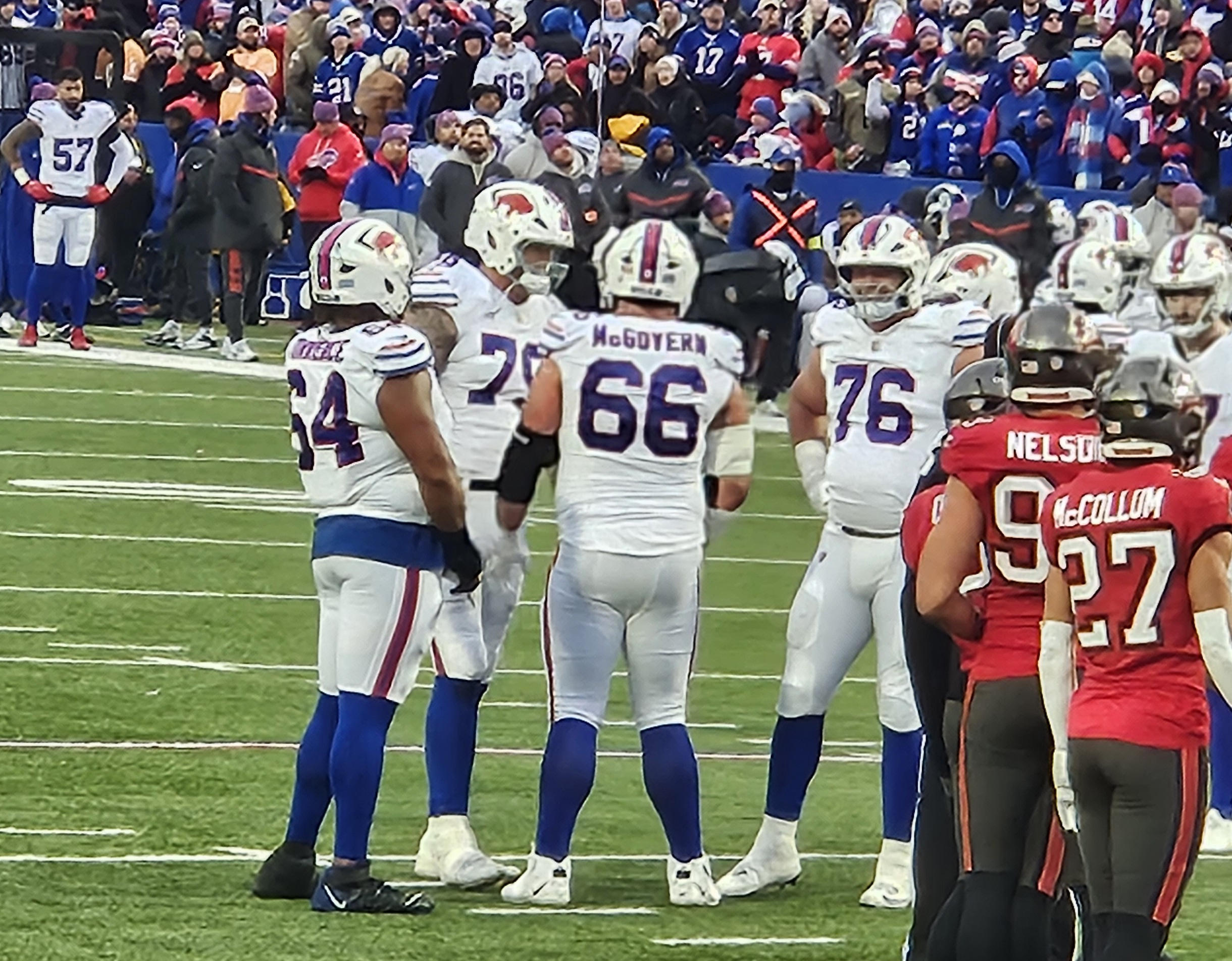
McGovern (#66) and his Bills teammates against the Tampa Bay Buccaneers in 2025

On March 16, 2023, McGovern signed a three-year, $22.4 million contract with the Buffalo Bills, with the intention of replacing Rodger Saffold. He started all 17 games at left guard and was part of an offensive line that allowed the fewest sacks in the league (24).

In 2024, after Mitch Morse was released as a salary cap casualty, McGovern was named the starter at center. He started 16 games and was part of an offensive line that allowed the fewest sacks in the league (14). He was declared inactive for the season finale against the New England Patriots. He was a Pro Bowl selection as a replacement of Kansas City Chiefs Creed Humphrey, who played in the Super Bowl.

On March 7, 2026, McGovern signed a four-year, $52 million contract extension with the Bills.
