= Brick Memorial High School =

Public secondary school in Ocean County, New Jersey, United States

Location
- 2001 Lanes Mill Road; Brick Township, Ocean County, New Jersey 08724; United States; 40.104049°N 74.132333°W

Information
- Type: Public high school
- Established: 1980
- School district: Brick Public Schools
- NCES School ID: 340222005896x
- Principal: Ed Sarluca
- Faculty: 92.8 FTEs
- Grades: 9-12
- Enrollment: 1,269 (as of 2024–25)
- Student to teacher ratio: 13.7:1
- Colors: Forest Green; White and Gold
- Athletics conference: Shore Conference
- Team name: Mustangs
- Website: www.brickschools.org/bmhs/

Brick Memorial High School (also known as Brick Township Memorial High School) is a four-year comprehensive public high school serving students in ninth through twelfth grades in Brick Township in Ocean County, in the U.S. state of New Jersey, operating as a part of the Brick Public Schools. The school opened in 1980 as the second of two secondary schools in the district, the other being Brick Township High School.

As of the 2024–25 school year, the school had an enrollment of 1,269 students and 92.8 classroom teachers (on an FTE basis), for a student–teacher ratio of 13.7:1. There were 389 students (30.7% of enrollment) eligible for free lunch and 72 (5.7% of students) eligible for reduced-cost lunch.

== History ==
Brick Township Memorial High School opened in September 1980 by sharing the building of Brick Township High School, with separate morning and afternoon sessions. The building, constructed at a cost of $11.4 million (equivalent to $44.5 million in 2025), opened in January 1981 for more than 1,000 students in grades 9 to 11.

== Student statistics ==
Test scores

Student test scores for the Class of 2014 were:

- HSPA Mathematics: 29% Partial, 56% Proficient, 14.9% Advanced (vs. statewide averages of 25%/50.7%/24.3%)
- HSPA Language Arts Literacy: 7.9% Partial, 79.5% Proficient, 12.7% Advanced (vs. 15.5%/70.9%/13.6% statewide)
- SAT: 502 Math, 482 Verbal, 487 Essay (vs. NJ averages of 520/496/499)
- Advanced Placement (AP): 74% scored 3 or higher, with 8.8% of students participating vs. 19.9% statewide

Graduation and post-graduation

Brick Memorial has a 91% graduation rate (vs. 87.5% statewide). A survey of the Class of 2010 reported that post-graduation plans were:

- 38.0% attend a four-year college/university
- 48.6% attend a two-year college (plus 0.2% other college and 2.5% other post-secondary)
- 1.4% join the military
- 8.2% enter full-time employment

== Awards, recognition and rankings ==
The school was the 188th-ranked public high school in New Jersey out of 339 schools statewide in New Jersey Monthly magazine's September 2014 cover story on the state's "Top Public High Schools", using a new ranking methodology. The school had been ranked 269th in the state of 328 schools in 2012, after being ranked 251st in 2010 out of 322 schools listed. The magazine ranked the school 261st in 2008 out of 316 schools. The school was ranked 239th in the magazine's September 2006 issue, which surveyed 316 schools across the state.

Schooldigger.com ranked the school 182nd out of 381 public high schools statewide in its 2011 rankings (an increase of 47 positions from the 2010 ranking) which were based on the combined percentage of students classified as proficient or above proficient on the mathematics (80.1%) and language arts literacy (92.4%) components of the High School Proficiency Assessment (HSPA).

Chemistry teacher Maria DeBruin was one of 45 teachers in the country selected as a Milken Educator of the Year in 2017.

== History ==
The school was constructed and opened in 1980 due to the large number of students enrolled at Brick Township High School. It was uncertain that the school would ever built because some community members felt that a new school would divide the town.

In addition to the required course work in English, history, math, science, and physical education, there are numerous selections in fine arts, foreign language, business and Air Force Junior Reserve Officers Training Corps (AFJROTC). The school offers Advanced Placement (AP) and honors courses in English, history, math, and science as well as in many elective courses within all subject areas. The academic program aims to prepare students not only for a competitive college career, but also for a vocational career.

Brick Memorial provides the opportunity to attend the Ocean County Vocational Technical School system. This program of study offers students training in transportation technologies, building trades, electronics, allied health services, and specialized trades in keeping with the industrial and employment opportunities available in the school's area. Brick Memorial includes technology as an integral part of every department and subject area. It also offers a wide range of extracurricular activities that appeals to the varied interests of the student population.

== Extracurricular activities ==
=== Athletics ===
The Brick Memorial High School Mustangs compete in Division A South of the Shore Conference, an athletic conference comprised of public and private high schools in Monmouth and Ocean counties along the Jersey Shore. The league operates under the jurisdiction of the New Jersey State Interscholastic Athletic Association (NJSIAA). With 1,104 students in grades 10-12, the school was classified by the NJSIAA for the 2019–20 school year as Group IV for most athletic competition purposes, which included schools with an enrollment of 1,060 to 5,049 students in that grade range. The school was classified by the NJSIAA as Group IV South for football for 2024–2026, which included schools with 890 to 1,298 students.

Brick Memorial offers 20 interscholastic sports programs, including baseball, basketball, bowling, cheering, cross country, dance, field hockey, football, golf, gymnastics, ice hockey, lacrosse, soccer, softball, swimming, tennis, track, volleyball, marching band and wrestling.

The boys soccer team finished the 1983 season with a record of 22-3-1, including 17 shutouts, after winning the Group III state title by defeating Wayne Valley High School by a score of 3-0 in the finals of the playoff tournament.

The wrestling team won the South Jersey Group III state sectional title in 1986, 1988, 1989, 1991, 1994-1996, 1998 and 1999, won the Central Jersey Group IV title in 2008, 2009, 2012, 2013 and 2020, and won in South Jersey Group V in 2015. The team won the Group III state championship in 1986, 1988, 1994, 1998, 1999, won the Group IV title in 2008, 2009, 2013, and the Group V title in 2015. The program's nine state championships are tied for the sixth-most in the state. The team was Group IV state champions in 2013, defeating Southern Regional High School.

The girls bowling team was state champions in 1990 and was Group IV champion in 2007, 2013, 2014, 2016 and 2017, and won the Group III title in 2020; the six state group titles are the fourth most of any team in the state. The team won the Tournament of Champions in 2013 and 2020.

The girls soccer team won the Group IV state championship in 1999 (with a win in the tournament final against Wayne Valley High School), 2002 (vs. Westfield High School), 2003 (vs. Bridgewater-Raritan High School) and 2004 (vs. Roxbury High School). In 1999, the team finished the season with a 24-1 record after winning the Group IV state title by defeating Wayne Valley by a score of 2-0 in the tournament final. The team won the South Jersey Group IV state sectional champions in 2002, 2003 and 2004.

The ice hockey team won the Handchen Cup in 2001 and 2003.

The football team won the in Central Jersey Group IV state sectional champions in 2003 (defeating Manalapan High School 29-6) and 2008 (with a 24-0 win over Sayreville War Memorial High School).

Men's bowling won the overall team title in 2004, won the Group IV championship in 2009, and won both Group IV title and the Tournament of Champions in 2014, defeating Immaculata High School to win the title.

The women's gymnastics Shore Conference champions and sectional champions, 2013.

=== Marching band ===
The Brick Memorial Marching Mustang Band, under the direction of Andrew Penrod, placed first in the 36th annual Tournament of Bands Group II Atlantic Coast Championship in 2008. The band's show, "A Knight's Pledge: The story of a Knight's Journey through Commencement, Adversity, and Triumph," earned a score of 97.4, placing them above the 110 other bands at the championship. This was the first time the Marching Mustangs won the Atlantic Coast Championships. The Marching Mustangs also broke the school record for most trophies won and highest score.

In 2009, the band placed first in the 37th annual Tournament of Bands Group II Atlantic Coast Champions. Their show, "The Gallery: Modern Art at the Speed of Life," won best music and was given a score of 96.85. This score was above the scores of 26 other bands in their group.

In 2010, the band placed first for their third consecutive year in the 38th annual Tournament of Bands II Atlantic Coast Champions. Their show. "Greetings From The Jersey Shore," won high music and high visual. They also broke their record set in 2008 and scored a 97.85.

In 2015, the band placed first after four years in the 43rd annual Tournament of Bands Group III Open Atlantic Coast Champions. With their show entitled, "Orchestrated," it featured the music of Benjamin Britten (The Young Person's Guide to the Orchestra) and Edward Elgar (Nimrod). Their score of 97.85 tied their highest score record from 2010.

In 2016, the band placed first again in the 44th annual Tournament of Bands Group III Open Atlantic Coast Champions. With their show entitled, "In Our Hands," it featured the musical arrangements of Pharrell's "Happy," and Danny Elfman's "Ice Dance" by composer Ben Lee. The band broke their record highest score from 2010 with a 98.10.

In 2017, the band placed first again in the 45th annual Tournament of Bands Group IV Open Atlantic Coast Champions. With their show entitled, "Bloom," it featured the musical arrangements of Celine Dion's "Prayer", Eric Whitacres "Fly to Paradise" and John Rudder's "Gloria" They won the captions "Best Brass", "Best Auxiliary" and "Best Music". The band broke the schools' record for highest score from 2016 with a 98.25. The band repeated as Group IV champion in 2018 and 2019.

=== Clubs ===
There are 44 clubs at Brick Memorial, including the American Sign Language Club, Animal Advocacy Club, Art Club, Bible Club, Brick Memorial Studios (Film Club), Chess Club, Chorus, Creative Writing, DECA, Drama Club, Equestrian Club, French National Honor Society, Garden Club, Gay Straight Alliance, Go Club, Graphic Novel Club, Habitat For Humanity, Holistic Health & Wellness Club, Honors Club, Italian Club, Italian National Honor Society, Interact Club, Junior State of America, Key Club, Knitting/Crocheting Club, Literary Magazine, Math Team, Mock Trial, National Honor Society, PALS Club, Paranormal Society Club, Recreation, Robotics Club, AFJROTC (Unit NJ-822), School Newspaper, Sirens of Reading, Society of Influences & Game Changers, Spanish Honor Society, STRONG, Student Government Association, SURF, VOICES, Yearbook Club, and Yoga Club.

== Administration ==
The school's principal is Ed Sarluca. His administration team includes four assistant principals, one of whom serves as the athletic director.

== Notable alumni ==
- Nick Catone (born 1981, class of 1999), retired professional mixed martial artist who fought in the Ultimate Fighting Championship
- Dana Eskelson, actress who has performed on television, film and theater
- Garrett Graham (born 1986, class of 2005), NFL tight end who has played for the Houston Texans
- Tom McCarthy (born 1968), television play-by-play announcer for the Philadelphia Phillies
- John Sadak (born 1979, class of 1996), television play-by-play announcer for the Cincinnati Reds, national TV/radio sports announcer for CBS Sports and Westwood One
- Leah Scarpelli (born 2001), soccer player who plays as a defender or midfielder for Brisbane Roar
- Joseph Zalinsky (born 2003), soccer player who plays as a defender for Rutgers Scarlet Knights and for New York Red Bulls II
