= Ja'Sir Taylor =

American football player (born 1999)

No. 26 – Cincinnati Bengals
- Position: Cornerback
- Roster status: Injured reserve

Personal information
- Born: January 8, 1999 (age 27); Asbury Park, New Jersey, U.S.
- Listed height: 5 ft 10 in (1.78 m)
- Listed weight: 185 lb (84 kg)

Career information
- High school: Brick Township (Brick Township, New Jersey)
- College: Wake Forest (2017–2021)
- NFL draft: 2022: 6th round, 214th overall pick

Career history
- Los Angeles Chargers (2022–2025); New York Jets (2025); Cincinnati Bengals (2026–present)

Career NFL statistics as of 2025
- Total tackles: 97
- Fumble recoveries: 1
- Pass deflections: 15
- Interceptions: 1
- Stats at Pro Football Reference

Ja'Sir Taylor (born January 8, 1999) is an American professional football cornerback for the Cincinnati Bengals of the National Football League (NFL). He played college football for the Wake Forest Demon Deacons and was selected by the Los Angeles Chargers in the sixth round of the 2022 NFL draft.

== College career ==
Raised in Brick Township, New Jersey, Taylor was ranked as a three–star recruit by 247Sports.com coming out of Brick Township High School. He committed to Wake Forest on January 19, 2017, over an offer from Temple. He played for Wake Forest from 2017 to 2021.

== Professional career ==
Pre-draft measurables
Height	Weight	Arm length	Hand span	Wingspan	40-yard dash	10-yard split	20-yard split	20-yard shuttle	Three-cone drill	Vertical jump	Broad jump	Bench press
5 ft 10 1/2 in (1.79 m)	186 lb (84 kg)	30 7/8 in (0.78 m)	8 5/8 in (0.22 m)	6 ft 2 3/8 in (1.89 m)	4.47 s	1.54 s	2.57 s	4.25 s	6.84 s	37.0 in (0.94 m)	10 ft 5 in (3.18 m)	12 reps
All values from Pro Day

=== Los Angeles Chargers ===
Taylor was drafted by the Los Angeles Chargers with the 214th pick in the sixth round of the 2022 NFL draft. As a rookie, he appeared in 17 games and started three. He finished with 22 total tackles and one pass defended.

Taylor made 16 appearances (six starts) for Los Angeles during the 2023 campaign, recording one interception, eight pass deflections, and 32 combined tackles. He played in 15 contests (including two starts) for the Chargers in 2024, posting five pass deflections, one fumble recovery, and 22 combined tackles.

Taylor made nine appearances for the Chargers as a reserve during the 2025 season, logging eight combined tackles.

=== New York Jets ===
On November 4, 2025, the Chargers traded Taylor to the New York Jets in exchange for a 2028 seventh-round pick. In eight appearances (one start) for the Jets, Taylor recorded one pass deflection and 13 combined tackles.

=== Cincinnati Bengals ===
On April 2, 2026, Taylor signed with the Cincinnati Bengals on a one-year contract. He was placed on injured reserve on August 30.
