= Brick Public Schools =

School district in Ocean County, New Jersey, US

Address
- 101 Hendrickson Avenue Brick Township, Ocean County, New Jersey, 08724; United States
- Coordinates: 40.081454°N 74.117006°W

District information
- Grades: PreK to 12
- Superintendent: Thomas G. Farrell
- Business administrator: James Edwards
- Schools: 12

Students and staff
- Enrollment: 8,414 (as of 2020–21)
- Faculty: 689.1 FTEs
- Student–teacher ratio: 12.2:1

Other information
- District Factor Group: DE
- Website: www.brickschools.org
Ind.	Per pupil	District spending	Rank (*)	K-12 average	%± vs. average
1A	Total Spending	$16,516	24	$18,891	−12.6%
1	Budgetary Cost	12,685	17	14,783	−14.2%
2	Classroom Instruction	7,935	19	8,763	−9.4%
6	Support Services	2,096	41	2,392	−12.4%
8	Administrative Cost	1,125	8	1,485	−24.2%
10	Operations & Maintenance	1,031	3	1,783	−42.2%
13	Extracurricular Activities	282	65	268	5.2%
16	Median Teacher Salary	63,384	41	64,043
Data from NJDoE 2014 Taxpayers' Guide to Education Spending. *Of K-12 districts with more than 3,500 students. Lowest spending=1; Highest=103

The Brick Public Schools are a comprehensive community public school district that serves students in pre-kindergarten through twelfth grade from Brick Township, in Ocean County, in the U.S. state of New Jersey.

As of the 2020–21 school year, the district, comprising 12 schools, had an enrollment of 8,414 students and 689.1 classroom teachers (on an FTE basis), for a student–teacher ratio of 12.2:1.

== History ==
Warren H. Wolf Preschool was created for the 2014–15 school year from Primary Learning Center and named for Warren Wolf, a longtime football coach and politician, who served as a Brick Township school board member, councilman, mayor, Ocean County freeholder and New Jersey State Assemblyman

The district had been classified by the New Jersey Department of Education as being in District Factor Group "DE", the fifth-highest of eight groupings. District Factor Groups organize districts statewide to allow comparison by common socioeconomic characteristics of the local districts. From lowest socioeconomic status to highest, the categories are A, B, CD, DE, FG, GH, I and J.

== Schools ==
Schools in the district (with 2020–21 enrollment data from the National Center for Education Statistics) are:

Preschools

- Herbertsville Preschool (147; PreK)
  - Walter Hrycenko, principal
- Warren H. Wolf Preschool (277; PreK)
  - Jacqueline Janik, principal

Elementary schools

- Drum Point Elementary School (479; K–5)
  - Chris Ott, principal
- Lanes Mill Elementary School (560; K–5)
  - Geraldine Bayles, principal
- Midstreams Elementary School (548; K–5)
  - John Billen, principal
- Osborneville Elementary School (402; K–5)
  - Jayne VanNosdall, principal
- Veterans Memorial Elementary School (647; K–5)
  - Ryan Blessing, principal
- Emma Havens Young Elementary School (732; K–5)
  - Michelle Cloud, principal

Middle schools

- Lake Riviera Middle School (861; 6–8)
  - Brittany Bucco, principal
- Veterans Memorial Middle School (965; 6–8)
  - Dana Triantafillos, principal

High schools

- Brick Memorial High School (1,410; 9–12)
  - Ed Sarluca, principal
- Brick Township High School (1,314; 9–12)
  - David Kasyan, principal

== Administration ==
Core members of the district's administration are:

- Thomas G. Farrell, superintendent of schools
- James Edwards, business administrator and board secretary

== Board of education ==
The district's board of education, comprised of seven members, sets policy and oversees the fiscal and educational operation of the district through its administration. As a Type II school district, the board's trustees are elected directly by voters to serve three-year terms of office on a staggered basis, with either two or three seats up for election each year held (since 2012) as part of the November general election. The board appoints a superintendent to oversee the district's day-to-day operations and a business administrator to supervise the business functions of the district.
