= Deptford Township High School =

High school in Gloucester County, New Jersey, US

Location
- 575 South Fox Run Road; Deptford Township, Gloucester County, New Jersey 08096; United States; 39.808062°N 75.11205°W

Information
- Type: Public high school
- Established: 1957
- NCES School ID: 340390002512
- Principal: Johnathan Maxson
- Faculty: 84.9 FTEs
- Enrollment: 1,098 (as of 2024–25)
- Student to teacher ratio: 12.9:1
- Colors: Vegas gold and black
- Athletics conference: Tri-County Conference (general); West Jersey Football League (football)
- Team name: Spartans
- Newspaper: Spartan Spirit
- Yearbook: Dorian
- Website: deptfordhs.deptfordschools.org

Deptford Township High School (also Deptford High School) is a four-year comprehensive community public high school that serves students in ninth through twelfth grades, located in Deptford Township, in Gloucester County, in the U.S. state of New Jersey. It is the sole secondary school of Deptford Township Schools.

As of the 2024–25 school year, the school had an enrollment of 1,098 students and 84.9 classroom teachers (on an FTE basis), for a student–teacher ratio of 12.9:1. There were 350 students (31.9% of enrollment) eligible for free lunch and 75 (6.8% of students) eligible for reduced-cost lunch.

== History ==
In 1956, the school district approved construction on a 65-acre (26 ha) site of a $700,000 junior high school (equivalent to $8.3 million in 2025) with 23 classrooms that would ultimately be transitioned for use as the district's high school, in lieu of sending students to attend Woodbury High School. The school opened in 1957.

The first classes taught at Gloucester County College (now Rowan College of South Jersey) when it opened in September 1968 were held at Deptford Township High School and Monongahela Junior High School.

== Awards, recognition and rankings ==
The school was the 259th-ranked public high school in New Jersey out of 339 schools statewide in New Jersey Monthly magazine's September 2014 cover story on the state's "Top Public High Schools", using a new ranking methodology. The school had been ranked 242nd in the state of 328 schools in 2012, after being ranked 255th in 2010 out of 322 schools listed. The magazine ranked the school 252nd in 2008 out of 316 schools. The school was ranked 226th in the magazine's September 2006 issue, which surveyed 316 schools across the state. Schooldigger.com ranked the school 229th out of 376 public high schools statewide in its 2010 rankings (an increase of 26 positions from the 2009 rank) which were based on the combined percentage of students classified as proficient or above proficient on the language arts literacy and mathematics components of the High School Proficiency Assessment (HSPA).

== Academics ==
A typical school day at Deptford High School is 7 hours with around 6 hours of classroom instruction. Average class sizes for 9, 10, 11, and 12 grades are 17.3, 18.7, 15.3, and 13.1, respectively. An average class size at Deptford is about 16.1 students as compared to the state average of 18.9 students. The student-computer ratio is 2.5 students for 1 computer, compared to a state average of 3.3:1. Of the 462 computers in the building, all 462 are connected to the internet.

== Extracurricular activities ==
=== Athletics ===
The Deptford High School Spartans compete as one of the member schools in the Tri-County Conference, which is comprised of public and private high schools located in Camden, Cape May, Cumberland, Gloucester and Salem counties. The conference is overseen by the New Jersey State Interscholastic Athletic Association (NJSIAA). With 829 students in grades 10-12, the school was classified by the NJSIAA for the 2019–20 school year as Group III for most athletic competition purposes, which included schools with an enrollment of 761 to 1,058 students in that grade range. The football team competes in the Colonial Division of the 94-team West Jersey Football League superconference and was classified by the NJSIAA as Group III South for football for 2024–2026, which included schools with 695 to 882 students.

The boys track team won the indoor state championship in Group III in 1970. The girls team was Group II co-champion in 1998.

The football team won the NJSIAA South Jersey Group III state sectional championship in 1978 and the South Jersey Group II titles in 1998, 2003 and 2004. A crowd of 3,500 watched as the 1978 team defeated Collingswood High School by a score of 14-0 to win the South Jersey Group III sectional title and finish the season with a record of 11-0. The team won the 2004 title with a 28–21 win over Moorestown High School.

The boys track team won the indoor relay championship in Group II in 2019.

The boys track team won the spring / outdoor track state championship in Group III in 2019.

=== Spartan Marching Band ===
The school's marching band finished in first place at the 2007 United States Scholastic Band Association National Championships, competing as a Group I band at M&T Bank Stadium in Baltimore, Maryland on November 16, 2007, with a score of 93.35.

The band scored first place in the 2014 TOB Atlantic Coast Championships with a score of 97.30.

The band also scored first place with their show Twilight Zone in the 2024 TOB Atlantic Coast Championships with a score of 94.55. , Tournament of Bands

=== National Honor Society ===
Deptford received its National Honor Society charter in 1960 and has been actively inducting members since.

=== NJROTC ===
In 2003, Deptford's NJROTC (Naval Junior Reserve Officers' Training Corps) program was established.

=== Other activities ===
Other activities at Deptford High School include Chess Club, All-School Musical (which usually takes place in the Spring), Culture Club, Debate Club, ERASE, the Fall Play, FBLA, Future Teachers of America, Freshman Transition, Gay-Straight Alliance, Girls' Athletic Association, Healthcare Careers Club, Mock Trial, National Art Honor Society, National Honor Society, Peer Mediation, Peer Tutors, Project Graduation, RAP (Respect All People), Robotics Club, Rotary Interact, Students Against Destructive Decisions, Science Club, Spartan Spirit Newspaper, Strength and Conditioning, Student Athletic Trainers, and SGA.

== Administration ==
The school's principal is Johnathan Maxson. The core administration team includes the vice principal, assistant principal and athletic director.

== Notable alumni ==
- Dave Rowe (born 1945, class of 1963), former football player, who played in the NFL from 1967 to 1978
- Shaun T (born 1978), motivational speaker, fitness trainer and choreographer best known for his home fitness programs T25, Insanity and Hip-Hop Abs
- Patti Smith (born 1946), singer-songwriter, author, and 2007 Rock and Roll Hall of Fame inductee
