= Shaun T =

American fitness trainer

Shaun Thompson
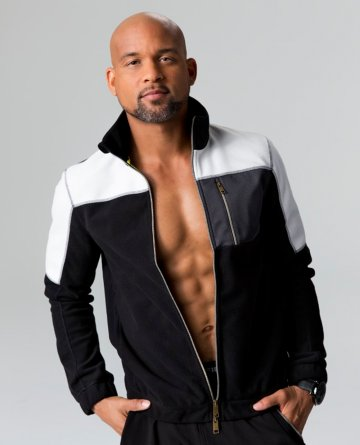
- Born: Shaun Thompson; May 2, 1978 (age 48); Camden, New Jersey, U.S.
- Education: Rowan University (B.S.)
- Occupation: Physical fitness trainer
- Spouse: Scott Blokker (m. 2012)
- Website: www.shauntlife.com

Shaun Thompson (born May 2, 1978), better known as Shaun T, is an American fitness trainer. He is best known for his home fitness programs for adults and children which include T25, Insanity, Hip-Hop AB's, Cize and Let's Get Up!. He has now also turned to bodybuilding and competing, which brought about his latest programs Dig Deeper and Dig In.

== Life and career ==
Born in Camden, New Jersey, Thompson grew up in Philadelphia and was raised by his grandparents in Deptford Township, New Jersey, where he enjoyed football, baseball and running track as a student at Deptford Township High School. He received a bachelor's degree in exercise science from Rowan University where he also minored in theater and dance. He is a member of Alpha Phi Alpha fraternity. He lives in Phoenix, Arizona.

== Personal life ==
Thompson has been openly gay since coming out at the age of 21 and is married to Scott Blokker. They are raising twin sons, born in November 2017.

== See also ==
- Beachbody
