= Scott Harley =

Profile
- Position: Running back

Personal information
- Born: c. 1977

Career information
- College: East Carolina (1995–1997)

Scott Harley (born c. 1977) is a former American football running back for the East Carolina Pirates from 1995 to 1997. In 1996, he ranked fourth among all major-college players with 1,745 rushing yards on 307 carries, an average of 5.7 yards per carry. Harley also set a single-game school record in 1996, gaining 241 rushing yards on 42 carries against NC State. At the end of the 1997, Harley announced he would forego his senior year to enter his name in the 1998 NFL draft.

== See also ==
- 1996 NCAA Division I-A football season#Rushing
