= Lake-Lehman Junior/Senior High School =

Lake Lehman Junior/Senior High School
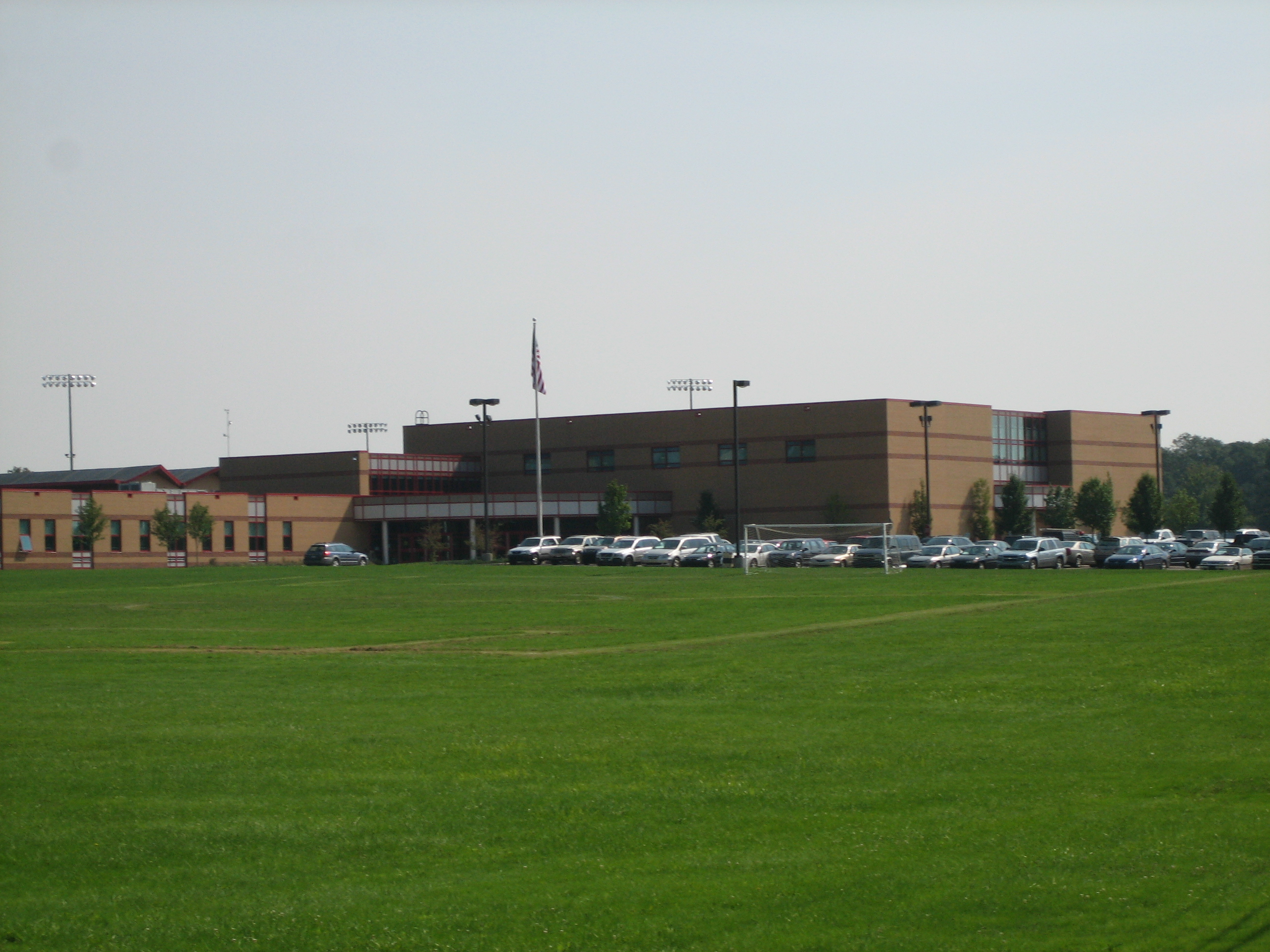
- Entrance and gymnasium seen from the corner of Hillside Road and Mountain View Drive

Location
- Old Route 115; Lehman, Pennsylvania 18627; United States
- 41.3103°N 76.0243°W

Information
- Type: Public school
- Established: 2003
- Founders: Merged
- School district: Lake-Lehman School District
- Principal: Matt Nonnenberg
- Grades: 7-12
- Enrollment: 743 (2023-2024)
- Colors: Black and gold
- Team name: Knights
- Newspaper: Knightlife
- Yearbook: The Roundtable
- Website: www.llsd.org/jr-sr-high-school

Lake Lehman Junior Senior High School is a public school in Lehman Township, Luzerne County, Pennsylvania, United States that was established by the merger of a Middle Level Educational Building, which provided an education from grades seven to eight, and a high school, which did the same for grades nine to twelve. The two schools were combined in 2003 and it is located in a rural setting.

Most classes consist of 30 or fewer students. Basic classes are offered for everyone, but the school also offers advanced courses, and Advanced Placement classes for college preparation.

== Activities ==
The school has many students in the National Honor Society and the National Junior Honor Society. Many students also participate in the National History Day Program, Science Olympiad, and JETS academic contests. Clubs include a community-service-based group, called Key Club, and a Seinfeld Club. Organizations such as Peer Helpers are composed of students who are role-model material and go through training in order to help peers in the school with problems.

Lake-Lehman's wrestling team has won numerous PIAA District 2 championships, 3 PIAA Northeast Regional Championships and a PIAA State Championship. Lake-Lehman has crowned 5 individual PIAA state wrestling champions (as recently as 2007) as well as numerous state medalists. The Girls field hockey team has won numerous PIAA District 2 championships and 2 PIAA State Championships. Lake-Lehman boys volleyball teams have won 22 Wyoming Valley Conference titles and 19 PIAA District 2 championships. Lake-Lehman has 5 state champions in Track and Field. The school has also crowned 2 PIAA Cross Country State Champions

The senior class raises money through sales of nutritional food during refreshment break. The senior trip to Washington D.C. is held in the spring. The class visits many monuments and buildings including the Smithsonian, the White House, Mt. Vernon, and the Arlington National Cemetery.

== Recent history ==
- Major hazing incident in September 2003
- Episode of MTV's Made featuring Angie Nice filmed and aired nationally in the fall of 2003. In this episode, Angie wanted to overcome her stage fright and become involved in the school play.

== Notable alumni ==
- Donora Hillard, author
- Raye Hollitt - Actress, female bodybuilder, and a former American Gladiator cast member.
- Brian Kelly - Former Professional Soccer Player
- Jay McCarroll - Fashion designer who won the reality show Project Runway in 2005
- Connor McGovern, NFL player
