= Brick Township High School =

Public high school in Ocean County, New Jersey, US

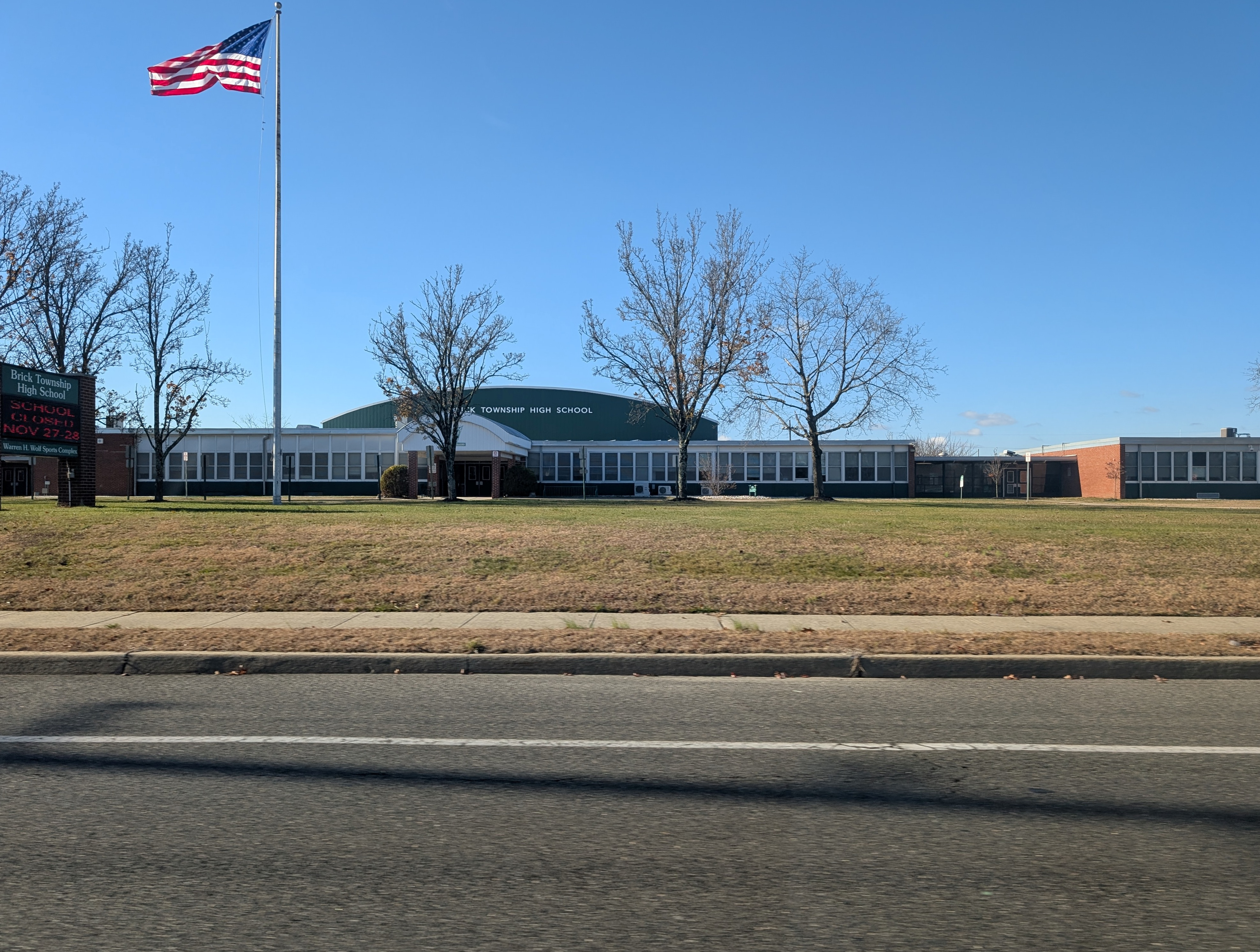

Location
- 346 Chambers Bridge Road; Brick, Ocean County, New Jersey 08723; United States; 40.071947°N 74.15075°W

Information
- Type: Public high school
- Established: September 1957
- School district: Brick Public Schools
- NCES School ID: 340222004582
- Principal: David Kasyan
- Faculty: 94.5 FTEs
- Grades: 9-12
- Enrollment: 1,200 (as of 2024–25)
- Student to teacher ratio: 12.7:1
- Colors: Green; White
- Athletics conference: Shore Conference
- Team name: Green Dragons
- Rival: Brick Memorial High School
- Publication: Regaler (literary magazine)
- Newspaper: The Flame
- Yearbook: Challenge
- Website: www.brickschools.org/bths/

Brick Township High School is a four-year public high school serving students in ninth through twelfth grades in Brick Township in Ocean County, in the U.S. state of New Jersey, operating as part of the Brick Public Schools. The school is one of two secondary schools in the district, the other being Brick Memorial High School.

As of the 2024–25 school year, the school had an enrollment of 1,200 students and 94.5 classroom teachers (on an FTE basis), for a student–teacher ratio of 12.7:1. There were 396 students (33.0% of enrollment) eligible for free lunch and 98 (8.2% of students) eligible for reduced-cost lunch.

== History ==
Students from Brick Township had attended Point Pleasant Beach High School for grades 9-12 as part of a sending/receiving relationship, though capacity issues in Point Pleasant Beach meant that Brick would send half of its students to Central Regional High School starting in 1956. By the 1958-59 school year, neither school would be able to accommodate students from Brick due to overcrowding.

Constructed at a cost of $1.6 million (equivalent to $17 million in 2025), and designed to handle from 868 to a maximum enrollment of 1,086, the school opened in September 1958 with 1,000 students in grades 7-12.

The school underwent a $5.7 million project in 2015 that replaced the original boilers and ventilators, and added air conditioning to the school for the first time.

Brick Memorial High School opened in September 1980 as the district's second high school, by sharing the building of Brick Township High School, with separate morning and afternoon sessions for the two schools. The building, constructed at a cost of $11.4 million, opened in January 1981 for more than 1,000 students in grades 9 to 11.

== Awards, recognition and rankings ==
The school was the 339th-ranked public high school in New Jersey out of 339 schools statewide in New Jersey Monthly magazine's September 2014 cover story on the state's "Top Public High Schools", using a new ranking methodology. The school had been ranked 261st in the state of 328 schools in 2012, after being ranked 248th in 2010 out of 322 schools listed. The magazine ranked the school 251st in 2008 out of 316 schools. The school was ranked 251st in the magazine's September 2006 issue, which surveyed 316 schools across the state.

Schooldigger.com ranked the school 208th out of 415 public high schools statewide in its 2018 rankings (an improvement of 36 positions from the 2017 rank) which were based on the combined percentage of students classified as proficient or above proficient on the language arts literacy and mathematics components of the High School Proficiency Assessment (HSPA).

== Athletics ==
The Brick Township High School Green Dragons compete in Division A South of the Shore Conference, an athletic conference comprised of public and private high schools in Monmouth and Ocean counties along the Jersey Shore. The league operates under the jurisdiction of the New Jersey State Interscholastic Athletic Association (NJSIAA). With 951 students in grades 10-12, the school was classified by the NJSIAA for the 2019–20 school year as Group III for most athletic competition purposes, which included schools with an enrollment of 761 to 1,058 students in that grade range. The school was classified by the NJSIAA as Group III South for football for 2024–2026, which included schools with 695 to 882 students. BTHS's mascot is a green dragon.

Interscholastic sports programs offered at Brick Township include baseball, basketball, bowling, cheering, cross country, field hockey, football, golf, gymnastics, ice hockey, indoor track, lacrosse, soccer, softball, swimming, table tennis, tennis, track, volleyball and wrestling.

Brick Township won the boys Group II cross country state championships in 1959 and won the Group III titles in 1964-1967. The school's Russ Taintor was the individual champion in Group III in 1965, 1966 and 1967, making him the second of eight boys cross country runners in New Jersey to win three individual state championships. He also won three consecutive one mile outdoor state championships and added two indoor two mile championships for a total of eight individual state titles.

The school's football team won the South Jersey Group IV state sectional championships in 1974, 1981–1983 and 1989, won the South Jersey Group III title in 1994 and won the Central Jersey Group IV title in 2013. BTHS is noted for its strong football program formerly headed by head coach Warren Wolf, who led the team for 51 years as the Green Dragon's first head coach and is the school's all-time winningest football coach, with a record of 361-122-11. Wolf retired after the 2008 football season as the state of New Jersey's all-time winningest football coach. In the first game played in the first year of playoffs, the 1974 team finished the season with a 10-0 record after winning the South Jersey Group IV state sectional title with a 21-20 victory against Camden High School in the championship game played indoors in Atlantic City's Conventional Hall. The 1981 team finished the season with an 11-0 record after winning the South Jersey Group IV sectional title with a 17-0 victory against Toms River High School East in front of 4,500 spectators at the championship game at Giants Stadium. With a 5-0 win in the championship against Willingboro High School, the 1983 team won its third South Jersey Group IV title in a three-year period in which the team had a record of 31-2.

The girls cross country team won the Group IV state title in 1976, 1977, 1987 and 1989, and won the Group III championships from 1994 to 1996. The program's seven state group titles are the eighth-most in the state. The team was the Meet of Champion winners in 1977 and 1988.

The ice hockey team was the overall state champion in 1976, 1977, 1979, 1986 and 1990, was public school champion 1996-1999 and 2002, and overall champion in 1997. The program's 11 state titles (in 14 appearances) is the second-most of any school statewide The school's ice hockey program produced NHL player Jim Dowd. Head Coach Bob Auriemma Sr. is New Jersey's all-time highest-winning high school ice hockey coach earning his 600th career win (on January 21, 2008), making him at the time the third highest winning high school coach in the nation.

The girls gymnastics team was the team state champion in 1979.

The boys' bowling team won the overall state championship in 1990.

The girls' bowling team has won the Group II state championship ten consecutive years, from 2008 through 2016. The team won the overall state championship in 2003-2005 and has won the Tournament of Champions in 2008, 2011, 2015 and 2016. The team's 12 group championships and four titles in the Tournament of Champions are the most of any school in the state.

The wrestling team won the Central Jersey Group III state sectional title in 2009, 2013 and 2014.

BTHS also is notable for its performing arts program, which includes Marching Band, Concert Band, Jazz Band, Chorus and Advanced Chorus. Their marching band has had great success competing in the USSBA circuit where they won the regional championship in 1998 and 2000 under their band director David Lyncheski. The Winter Guard program has been successful under the direction of Director Jessica VanFossen and Assistant Director Christian Negri, winning the 2018 USBands Scholastic Novice Championship, the 2019 USBands Scholastic Regional A Championship, and the 2022 TIA Region 7 Scholastic Regional A Championship.

== Clubs ==
Active clubs in Brick Township High School include Art & Poetry Society, Bible Club, CBE, Challenge Yearbook, Chess Club, Computer Club, DECA, GSA Club, Dance Club, Drama, FBLA, Fashion Design, Forensics, HOSA, Interact Club, Key Club, LEO Club, Math Club, Mock Trial, Multicultural Club, National Honor Society, Regaler (literary magazine), Student Government Association, School Store, Ski Club, Spirit Club, Sweep, Table Tennis, The Flame school newspaper, TV Club, Marching Band, Chorus, Color Guard, Jazz Band, Junior State of America and Sewing Club, Recreation Club, FEA, STRONG, and Word Analysis Club.

== Administration ==
The school's principal is David Kasyan. His administration team includes three assistant principals and the athletic director.

== Notable alumni ==
- Joe Acanfora (born 1950, class of 1968), educator and activist who fought to teach earth science in public schools in the early 1970s but was dismissed based upon his acknowledged homosexuality
- Johnny Buchanan (born 1999), American football linebacker who has played for the St. Louis Battlehawks of the XFL
- Jim Dowd (born 1968), hockey player who played most of his career for the New Jersey Devils and won the Stanley Cup with them in 1995
- Craig Scarpelli (born 1961, class of 1979), retired soccer goalkeeper who played professionally in the North American Soccer League, United Soccer League and American Soccer League
- Ja'Sir Taylor (born 1999, class of 2017), American football cornerback for the Los Angeles Chargers of the National Football League
- Art Thoms (born 1947), defensive tackle who played in the NFL for the Oakland Raiders and Philadelphia Eagles

== Notable faculty ==
- Danny Nee (born 1945), former college basketball head coach, most notably with the Nebraska Cornhuskers men's basketball team, coached at Brick Township 1973–1976
