= Ursula G. T. Müller =

German gender studies specialist, State Secretary for Schleswig-Holstein

Ursula G. T. Müller (born 1944) is a German feminist, sociologist and former Secrerary of State of Schleswig-Holstein. From the late 1970s, she has played an important part in developing interest in women's studies, from 1976 at the Technical University of Dortmund, then at Bielefeld University where from 1989 until her retirement in 2012 she was Professor of Women's Studies. In parallel, she became the first director of the university's Interdisciplinary Centre for Women's Studies (Interdisziplinären Frauenforschungszentrum). She has published widely on the subject of gender studies.

== Biography ==
From 1963, Müller studied mathematics and physics at the Goethe University Frankfurt where she earned a doctorate in 1967. She then spent five years in the United States teaching mathematics at the Pennsylvania State University. On returning to Germany, she studied sociology, political science and psychology at the University of Giessen (1972–79), earning a master's degree with a thesis on Sexualmoral im Spätkapitalismus (Sexual Morality in Late Capitalism).

From 1976 to 1989, she was attached to the Social Research Centre at the Technical University of Dortmund. In 1989, Müller was appointed professor of the Department of Gender Studies (Frauenforschung) at Bielefeld University, so becoming a pioneer in the newly established field of study. In Walk on the Wild Side (2019) she reflects on her career at the university where she faced considerable difficulties and was seldom recognized for her successes.

From 1966 until her retirement in 1999, Müller was Secrerary of State for the Schleswig-Holstein Ministry for Women, Youth, Housing and Urban Development.
