= 2024 deaths in American television =

The following deaths of notable individuals related to American television occurred in 2024.

== January ==
Date	Name	Age	Notes	Sources
January 1	Mickey Cottrell	79	Actor (Star Trek: The Next Generation, Star Trek: Voyager)	
January 2	Peter Berkos	101	Sound editor (Battlestar Galactica, Buck Rogers in the 25th Century)	
January 3	Bridget Dobson	85	Television writer (General Hospital, Guiding Light) and producer (Santa Barbara)	
January 4	Glynis Johns	100	British actress, dancer, musician, and singer (Batman, Cheers, The Love Boat)	
January 4	Christian Oliver	51	German actor best known as Brian Keller on Saved by the Bell: The New Class	
January 4	David Soul	80	American-British actor and singer best known as Kenneth "Hutch" Hutchinson on Starsky & Hutch	
January 4	Tracy Tormé	64	Television writer (Sliders, Star Trek: The Next Generation)	
January 5	Brian McConnachie	81	Actor and television writer (Saturday Night Live, Shining Time Station, Noddy)	
January 8	Adan Canto	42	Mexican actor (The Following, Designated Survivor, The Cleaning Lady)	
January 10	Peter Crombie	71	Actor best known as "Crazy" Joe Davola on Seinfeld	
January 10	Conrad Palmisano	75	Stuntman and director (The Young Rebels)	
January 10	Tisa Farrow	72	Actress (The Generation Gap, The Initiation of Sarah, Allen v. Farrow)	
January 11	April Ferry	91	Costume designer (Rome, My Name Is Bill W., Game of Thrones)	
January 11	Lynne Marta	78	Actress and singer (Gidget, Love, American Style, Starsky & Hutch)	
January 11	Ruth Ashton Taylor	101	Newscaster for Los Angeles' KCBS-TV	
January 12	Bill Hayes	98	Actor and singer best known as Doug Williams on Days of Our Lives	
January 12	Alec Musser	50	Actor and fitness model best known as Del Henry on All My Children	
January 13	Joyce Randolph	99	Actress best known as Trixie Norton on The Honeymooners	
January 13	Tom Shales	79	Author and television critic for The Washington Post	
January 15	William O'Connell	94	Actor (Star Trek, Rawhide, Petticoat Junction, Quincy, M.E.)	
January 15	Reid Harrison	65	Television writer and producer (The Simpsons).	
January 16	David Gail	58	Actor best known as Stuart Carson on Beverly Hills, 90210 and Dr. Joe Scanlon on Port Charles	
January 17	Benedict Fitzgerald	74	American screenwriter	
January 19	Marlena Shaw	84	American singer whose songs were used in television commercials	
January 20	Francisco Ciatso	48	Professional wrestler (WWE and TNA)	
January 20	David Emge	77	Actor	
January 22	Gary Graham	73	Actor best known as Detective Matthew Sikes on Alien Nation and Ambassador Soval on Star Trek: Enterprise	
January 22	Dexter King	62	Civil and animal rights activist (portrayed his father, Martin Luther King Jr., in the television movie The Rosa Parks Story)	
January 23	Charles Osgood	91	Journalist and host of CBS News Sunday Morning	
January 23	Margaret Riley	58	Film and television producer who served as the executive producer of Ratched	
January 23	Melanie Safka	76	Singer-songwriter. She wrote the lyrics to the Beauty and the Beast theme song, "The First Time I Loved Forever".	
January 23	Ice Train	56	Professional wrestler (WCW)	
January 24	Rod Holcomb	80	Director (several television movies and series, most notably the pilot and final episodes of ER)	
January 24	Jesse Jane	43	Pornographic actress. She made appearances as herself on Entourage, Bad Girls Club, and Gene Simmons Family Jewels. She also had an uncredited role in the television movie Baywatch: Hawaiian Wedding.	
January 24	Herbert Coward	85	Actor	
January 29	Amanda Davies	42	Actress best known for playing a younger version of Victoria Lord in flashback scenes of One Life to Live	
January 30	Hinton Battle	67	Actor (Quantum Leap, Touched by an Angel, Buffy the Vampire Slayer)	
January 30	Chita Rivera	91	Actress best known as Connie Richardson on The New Dick Van Dyke Show	
January 31	Joe Madison	74	Radio talk-show host	

== February ==
Date	Name	Age	Notes	Sources
February 1	Mark Gustafson	63	Animator (Claymation Easter, The PJs)	
February 1	Carl Weathers	76	Football player (Oakland Raiders) and actor (Street Justice, In the Heat of the Night, Arrested Development, The Mandalorian)	
February 2	Don Murray	94	Actor best known as Sid Fairgate on Knots Landing.	
February 3	Helena Rojo	79	Mexican actress and model (Ugly Betty)	
February 5	Mickey Gilbert	87	Actor, stuntman, and rodeo performer (Stunts Unlimited, Kolchak: The Night Stalker)	
February 5	Toby Keith	62	Country singer and songwriter. Made guest appearances on The Colbert Report and Huckabee.	
February 6	Cecilia Gentili	52	Argentine-American LGBTQ rights activist and actress best known as Ms. Orlando on Pose.	
February 6	Robert M. Young	99	Director, screenwriter, producer, and cinematographer (Solomon & Sheba, Slave of Dreams, Battlestar Galactica)	
February 7	Mojo Nixon	66	Actor (USA Up All Night)	
February 7	Henry Fambrough	85	Founder and vocalist of the R&B group The Spinners. He and his groupmates guest-starred on Laverne & Shirley.	
February 10	E. Duke Vincent	91	Television producer (Beverly Hills, 90210, Charmed, 7th Heaven)	
February 11	Randy Sparks	90	Founder of the folk music group The New Christy Minstrels. He and his groupmates were featured in The Andy Williams Show and Ford Presents the New Christy Minstrels.	
February 14	Dan Wilcox	82	Television producer and writer best known for working on M*A*S*H	
February 15	Anne Whitfield	85	Actress (Gunsmoke, Perry Mason, Cheyenne)	
February 16	Ben Lanzarone	85	Composer (Happy Days, Dynasty, Mr. Belvedere)	
February 18	Lanny Flaherty	81	Actor (The Education of Max Bickford, The Exonerated, Lonesome Dove). He made guest appearances in The Edge of Night, The Equalizer, White Collar, Alpha House and Little America.	
February 18	Tony Ganios	64	Actor	
February 18	Bobbie Wygant	97	Television reporter for KXAS-TV	
February 19	Paul D'Amato	74	Actor (A Case of Deadly Force, American Playhouse, Law & Order, Law & Order: Criminal Intent, The Unusuals)	
February 20	Ron Cameron	79	American radio host	
February 21	Pamela Salem	80	British actress (Magnum, P.I., ER, The West Wing)	
February 22	Kent Melton	68	Animation sculptor (The Completely Mental Misadventures of Ed Grimley and Tiny Toon Adventures)	
February 22	Roni Stoneman	85	Country musician (Hee Haw)	
February 23	Chris Gauthier	48	English-born Canadian actor (Earthsea, School of Life, Eureka, Harper's Island, Iron Invader, Once Upon a Time, A Series of Unfortunate Events, The Christmas House, Joe Pickett). He made guest appearances in Smallville, Level Up and Signed, Sealed, Delivered.	
February 23	Jackie Loughery	93	Actress (Perry Mason, Burke's Law, Bonanza)	
February 23	Lynda Gravátt	76	Actress	
February 24	Kenneth Mitchell	49	Canadian actor (Jericho, Ghost Whisperer, Switched at Birth, Star Trek: Discovery, Star Trek: Lower Decks)	
February 25	Charles Dierkop	87	Actor (The Naked City, Gunsmoke, Police Woman, The Deerslayer). He made guest appearances in Voyage to the Bottom of the Sea, Lost in Space, The Man from U.N.C.L.E., The Andy Griffith Show, and more.	
February 26	Ole Anderson	81	Professional wrestler (WCW, Pro Wrestling USA)	
February 27	Richard Lewis	76	Comedian and actor (Anything but Love and Curb Your Enthusiasm); also appeared in TV commercials for Boku Fruit Juice	
February 28	Mike Jones	72	Professional wrestler (known as Virgil in the WWF and Vincent in WCW)	
February 29	Paul Vachon	86	Canadian professional wrestler (American Wrestling Association, World Wrestling Federation, and National Wrestling Alliance)	

== March ==
Date	Name	Age	Notes	Sources
March 1	Iris Apfel	102	Fashion designer. Guest starred as herself in Today, Project Runway All Stars, Celebrity Page and others.	
March 1	Janice Burgess	72	Television writer and producer best known for being the creator of The Backyardigans.	
March 2	Mark Dodson	64	Actor (Ewoks: The Battle for Endor, Arachnicide). He made guest appearances in Darkwing Duck and Bonkers.	
March 3	Chris Mortensen	72	Sportswriter and television reporter for ESPN	
March 5	Debra Byrd	72	Vocalist (American Idol, The Voice)	
March 7	Steve Lawrence	88	Singer and actor (Tonight Starring Steve Allen, The Ed Sullivan Show, The Nanny). He made guest appearances in Frasier, Hot in Cleveland, and others.	
March 10	Jerry Foley	68	Director and producer, most notably on Late Show with David Letterman	
March 11	Eric Carmen	74	Singer and multi-instrumentalist (Raspberries, solo); multiple appearances on The Midnight Special	
March 11	Malachy McCourt	92	Actor (Search for Tomorrow, Ryan's Hope, All My Children).	
March 12	John Lomax	72	Television news anchor and reporter for WKRC-TV	
March 12	Robyn Bernard	64	Actress (General Hospital). She made guest appearances in Whiz Kids, Simon & Simon, The Facts of Life and others.	
March 13	Gerald M. Levin	84	Former CEO. Appeared himself in 60 Minutes and The 2000s.	
March 13	Bill Jorgensen	96	Television news anchor for WNYW	
March 13	Dan Wakefield	91	Television writer (James at 15)	
March 14	David Breashears	68	Cinematographer and producer (Frontline and Nova).	
March 14	Beth Peters	92	Actress (General Hospital, Mr. Belvedere, Quantum Leap)	
March 15	Joe Camp	84	Director and writer (Benji, Zax & the Alien Prince).	
March 16	David Seidler	86	British-American television writer (Malice in Wonderland, Onassis: The Richest Man in the World, Goldrush: A Real Life Alaskan Adventure, Come On, Get Happy: The Partridge Family Story, Son of the Dragon).	
March 18	Jennifer Leak	76	Canadian actress (The Young and the Restless, Guiding Light and Another World)	
March 18	James M. Ward	72	Game designer, fantasy author, and writer (G.I. Joe: A Real American Hero).	
March 19	M. Emmet Walsh	88	Actor (The Sandy Duncan Show, Gibbsville, Home Improvement)	
March 19	Dianne Crittenden	82	Casting director and actress (A Bright Shining Lie, Vendetta)	
March 21	Ron Harper	91	Actor (Garrison's Gorillas, Planet of the Apes, Land of the Lost, Generations, Another World)	
March 21	Sarah-Ann Shaw	90	Television reporter for WBZ-TV	
March 23	Eli Noyes	81	Animator (Sesame Street, Liquid Television)	
March 25	Paula Weinstein	78	Producer (Grace and Frankie)	
March 27	Joe Lieberman	82	Politician and lawyer (Diary of a Political Tourist).	
March 29	Louis Gossett Jr.	87	Actor (Cowboy in Africa, The Mod Squad, Captain Planet and the Planeteers, The Batman). He made guest appearances in Touched by an Angel, The Dead Zone, Family Guy and others.	
March 30	Chance Perdomo	27	British actor (Chilling Adventures of Sabrina, Gen V)	
March 31	Barbara Baldavin	85	Actress (Star Trek: The Original Series, Medical Center, Dynasty, Trapper John, M.D.)	
March 31	Barbara Rush	97	Actress (Peyton Place, All My Children, 7th Heaven)	

== April ==
Date	Name	Age	Notes	Sources
April 1	Joe Flaherty	82	Actor best known as "Count" Floyd Robertson on SCTV and The Completely Mental Misadventures of Ed Grimley and Harold Weir on Freaks and Geeks	
April 1	Michael Ward	57	Guitarist. Guest spots on Live with Kelly and Mark and Total Request Live.	
April 2	Christopher Durang	75	Playwright and actor (Frasier, Kristin). He made guest appearances in Tales from the Crypt and a few others.	
April 2	Larry Lucchino	78	Baseball executive. Appeared himself in 60 Minutes and Mike & Mike.	
April 4	Bruce Kessler	88	Racing driver and television director (Renegade, The Commish).	
April 5	Cole Brings Plenty	27	Actor best known as Pete Plenty Clouds on 1923.	
April 7	Jerry Grote	81	Baseball catcher. Appeared as himself in What's My Line? and Everybody Loves Raymond.	
April 7	Lori and George Schappell	62	Conjoined twins. They appeared as themselves on episodes of shows like Maury and The Jerry Springer Show. They also played a pair of conjoined twins in an episode of Nip/Tuck.	
April 8	Bob Ellison	91	Writer, producer, and script consultant (several series, among them The Mary Tyler Moore Show, Cheers, Dear John, and Becker)	
April 9	Patti Astor	74	Actress	
April 9	Carla Balenda	98	Actress	
April 10	Mister Cee	57	DJ record executive. Appeared as himself in Luke Cage, Unsung and others.	
April 10	Trina Robbins	85	Artwork (Independent Lens)	
April 10	O. J. Simpson	76	Actor (1st & Ten, Goldie and the Boxer, A Killing Affair, Hertz commercials), subject of Juice on the Loose, football player (Buffalo Bills, San Francisco 49ers), and broadcaster (Monday Night Football, NFL on NBC); his trial and acquittal on two murder charges for the killing of his ex-wife Nicole Brown Simpson and her friend Ron Goldman was a major television event dubbed the "Trial of the century".	
April 10	Dan Wallin	97	Sound engineer (The Muppets' Wizard of Oz, Fringe).	
April 11	Meg Bennett	75	Soap opera actress (Julia Newman on The Young and the Restless) and writer (most notably on Y&R, Santa Barbara and General Hospital)	
April 12	Roberto Cavalli	83	Italian designer. Appeared as himself in The Girls Next Door, Project Runway and others.	
April 12	Eleanor Coppola	87	Filmmaker. Appeared as herself in Celebrity Page and Made in Hollywood.	
April 12	Robert MacNeil	93	Canadian-American journalist (PBS NewsHour).	
April 13	Faith Ringgold	93	Painter and art department (5th Ward). Appeared as herself in Makers: Women Who Make America and CBS News Sunday Morning.	
April 13	Ron Thompson	83	Actor (Beretta). He made guest appearances in The Rebels and others.	
April 15	Jerry Savelle	77	Author and televangelist. Appeared as himself in Praise.	
April 15	Whitey Herzog	92	Baseball player. Appeared as himself in Jim Rome Is Burning.	
April 16	Carl Erskine	97	Baseball pitcher (Brooklyn Dodgers: Ghosts of Flatbush). Appeared as himself in The Ed Sullivan Show and others.	
April 16	Barbara O. Jones	82	Actress (Freedom Road). She made guest appearances in The Quest, Laverne & Shirley and others.	
April 18	Dickey Betts	80	Guitarist and member of The Allman Brothers Band. Appeared as himself in The History of Rock 'n' Roll and others.	
April 18	Mandisa	47	Christian singer. Appeared as herself in American Idol and others.	
April 18	Spencer Milligan	86	Actor best known as Rick Marshall on Land of the Lost	
April 19	Daniel Dennett	82	Philosopher and writer. Appeared as himself in Closer to Truth and others.	
April 20	Charles Bateman	93	Actor (Santa Barbara, Days of Our Lives).	
April 20	Howie Schwab	63	Sports trivia expert (Sports Jeopardy!, Stump the Schwab)	
April 20	Roman Gabriel	83	Football player. He made guest appearances in Perry Mason and more.	
April 20	Michael Cuscuna	75	Jazz record producer. Appeared as himself in Jazz.	
April 21	Alex Hassilev	91	Musician and band member of The Limeliters. He made guest appearances in Get Smart and several others.	
April 23	Terry Carter	95	Actor (McCloud, Battlestar Galactica) and filmmaker.	
April 24	Ray Chan	56	Art director. Appeared as himself in Marvel Studios: Assembled.	
April 24	Harry Pappas	78	Television broadcasting entrepreneur, co-founder of Pappas Telecasting Companies.	
April 25	Marla Adams	85	American actress (The Secret Storm, The Young and the Restless, Generations, The President's Man, Walker, Texas Ranger). She made guest appearances in Emergency!, Capitol, The Bold and the Beautiful, Days of Our Lives, and Bewitched.	
April 28	Brian McCardie	59	Scottish actor (Outlander, Snatch).	
April 28	Zack Norman	83	Actor (The Nanny). He made guest appearances in Baywatch and a few others.	
April 28	Joe Thomas	83	American producer	

== May ==
Date	Name	Age	Notes	Sources
May 1	Richard Maloof	84	Musician. Appeared as himself in The Lawrence Welk Show.	
May 2	Susan Buckner	72	Actress (The Brady Bunch Hour, The Amazing Howard Hughes, The Hardy Boys/Nancy Drew Mysteries, Return Engagement, When the Whistle Blows). She made guest appearances in Police Woman, Switch, Starsky & Hutch, B. J. and the Bear and The Love Boat.	
May 2	Edgar Lansbury	94	British-American producer (Coronet Blue).	
May 2	Peter Oosterhuis	75	English golf pro and analyst for PGA Tour on CBS and Golf Channel	
May 2	Roxanne	95	Actress and model (assistant on Beat the Clock)	
May 3	Dick Rutan	85	Aviator. Appeared as himself in The Tonight Show Starring Johnny Carson and 60 Minutes.	
May 5	Jeannie Epper	83	Actress and stuntwoman (Wonder Woman)	
May 5	Gloria Stroock	99	Actress (The Girls, Archie Bunker's Place, Baretta)	
May 6	Ian Gelder	74	British actor best known as Kevan Lannister on Game of Thrones	
May 6	Hootie Ingram	90	Football player. Appeared as himself in SportsCentury.	
May 6	Robert Logan Jr.	82	Actor best known as J.R. Hale on 77 Sunset Strip	
May 6	Don Penny	91	Actor	
May 7	Steve Albini	61	Music producer (Delocated). Appeared as himself in Metal Evolution and others.	
May 8	John Barbata	79	Drummer. Appeared as himself in Behind the Music.	
May 9	Roger Corman	98	Film director. Appeared as himself in American Masters, Entertainment Tonight, and more.	
May 9	James Gregory	78	American stand-up comedian	
May 10	Sam Rubin	64	Entertainment reporter for KTLA in Los Angeles.	
May 11	Susan Backlinie	77	Actress and stuntwoman (Quark). She also made guest appearances in The Quest and The Fall Guy.	
May 11	Kevin Brophy	70	Actor (Lucan, M*A*S*H, JAG)	
May 12	David Sanborn	78	Alto saxophonist and television presenter (Night Music). He also played for the Saturday Night Live Band and The World's Most Dangerous Band on Late Night with David Letterman in the 1980s.	
May 13	Samm-Art Williams	78	Writer (Cagney & Lacey, Miami Vice) and television producer (The Fresh Prince of Bel-Air)	
May 14	Gudrun Ure	98	Scottish actress (The 10th Kingdom)	
May 15	Barbra Fuller	102	Actress (Adventures of Superman, My Three Sons, Perry Mason)	
May 16	Dabney Coleman	92	Actor (several series, most notably Buffalo Bill, The Slap Maxwell Story, and Yellowstone) and voice artist (The Magic School Bus, Recess, The Zeta Project, and Pound Puppies)	
May 17	Peter Bennett	56	Animator (SpongeBob SquarePants, ChalkZone)	
May 18	Alice Stewart	58	Political commentator for CNN	
May 18	Patrick Gottsch	70	Media executive (founder of RFD-TV and The Cowboy Channel)	
May 19	Peggi Blu	77	Singer best known as a vocal coach on American Idol.	
May 19	Richard Foronjy	86	Actor (The Jeffersons, Cagney & Lacey, Hill Street Blues)	
May 22	Darryl Hickman	92	Actor and screenwriter. He made guest appearances in Alfred Hitchcock Presents, Gunsmoke and others.	
May 23	Caleb Carr	68	Author, screenwriter, and producer (writer of the 1991 television movie Bad Attitudes)	
May 23	Morgan Spurlock	53	Filmmaker (director of The Simpsons 20th Anniversary Special – In 3-D! On Ice!) and TV host/producer (Morgan Spurlock Inside Man, 30 Days)	
May 25	Albert S. Ruddy	94	Canadian-American film and television producer best known for creating Hogan's Heroes. He also voiced Fatcat in Running Mates.	
May 25	Richard M. Sherman	95	Songwriter and composer (Welcome to Pooh Corner, Goldilocks).	
May 25	Johnny Wactor	37	Actor best known as Brando Corbin on General Hospital.	
May 27	Elizabeth MacRae	88	Actress best known as Lou-Ann Poovie on Gomer Pyle, U.S.M.C.	
May 27	Bill Walton	71	Basketball player and sportscaster. Appeared as himself in American Dad! and a few others.	
May 28	Jac Venza	97	Public television producer (NET Playhouse, Live from Lincoln Center, American Playhouse).	
May 30	Mitchell Block	73	Filmmaker best known for creating the series Carrier.	
May 31	Martin Starger	92	Television executive (president of ABC Entertainment) and producer (Friendly Fire, All Quiet on the Western Front, and other television movies)	

== June ==
Date	Name	Age	Notes	Sources
June 1	Erich Anderson	67	Actor (Thirtysomething, Melrose Place, Felicity)	
June 2	Jeannette Charles	96	British actress and Elizabeth II impersonator (Saturday Night Live)	
June 2	Janis Paige	101	Actress (It's Always Jan, Eight Is Enough, All in the Family)	
June 3	Armando Silvestre	98	American-born Mexican actor (Mannix, The Quest, Wonder Woman)	
June 3	Betty Anne Rees	81	American actress	
June 4	Tom Bower	86	Actor best known as Dr. Curtis Willard on The Waltons.	
June 11	Howard Fineman	75	Journalist and television commentator (NBC News)	
June 11	Tony Lo Bianco	87	Actor (Police Story, Jesus of Nazareth, Marco Polo)	
June 11	Tony Mordente	88	Television director (Rhoda, Walker, Texas Ranger, 7th Heaven)	
June 12	Ron Simons	63	Actor (Nowhere Man, Jonny Zero, Law & Order) and producer	
June 12	Bob Harris	81	American sportscaster	
June 13	Jonathan Axelrod	74	Producer and screenwriter best known for executive producing Dave's World.	
June 13	Angela Bofill	70	Singer-songwriter. She made guest appearances on Soul Train and The Pat Sajak Show.	
June 13	Benji Gregory	46	Actor best known as Brian Tanner on ALF	
June 16	Evans Evans	91	Actress	
June 18	Willie Mays	93	Hall of fame baseball player. He made several guest appearances on shows like What's My Line?, The Donna Reed Show, The Dating Game, and Bewitched. He also voiced himself in the Rankin/Bass animated special Willie Mays and the Say-Hey Kid.	
June 18	Anthea Sylbert	84	Film producer (Truman, If You Believe) and costume designer	
June 19	Russell Morash	88	Television producer and director(The French Chef, The Victory Garden, This Old House)	
June 20	Donald Sutherland	88	Canadian actor (Commander in Chief, Dirty Sexy Money, Trust)	
June 20	Taylor Wily	56	Actor best known as Kamekona Tupuola on Hawaii Five-0	
June 21	Jamie Kellner	77	Television executive (Fox, The WB)	
June 23	Tamayo Perry	49	American professional surfer	
June 24	Shifty Shellshock	49	Frontman of Crazy Town. He made appearances on Celebrity Rehab with Dr. Drew and Sober House.	
June 24	Joan Benedict Steiger	96	Actress best known as Edith Fairchild on General Hospital	
June 25	Sika Anoa'i	79	WWE Hall of Fame professional wrestler	
June 26	Bill Cobbs	90	Actor (The Slap Maxwell Story, The Drew Carey Show, Star Trek: Enterprise)	
June 27	Martin Mull	80	Actor (Sabrina the Teenage Witch, Arrested Development, Roseanne), comedian, and musician; regular panelist on Hollywood Squares; voice work for animated shows like The Simpsons, Danny Phantom, and American Dad!; television commercial spokesperson for Red Roof Inn	

== July ==
Date	Name	Age	Notes	Sources
July 1	Robert Towne	89	Screenwriter and director (The Lloyd Bridges Show, Breaking Point, The Outer Limits).	
July 5	Judith Belushi-Pisano	73	Radio and television producer.	
July 9	David Loughery	71	Screenwriter and film producer.	
July 9	Dan Collins	80	American journalist	
July 11	Shelley Duvall	75	Actress (Faerie Tale Theatre, Tall Tales & Legends, Shelley Duvall's Bedtime Stories)	
July 12	Ruth Westheimer	96	Sex therapist and television host (The Dr. Ruth Show and What's Up, Dr. Ruth?). She also made guest appearances on shows like Late Night with David Letterman, The Arsenio Hall Show, One Life to Live, and Quantum Leap.	
July 12	Evan Wright	59	Writer (Generation Kill and its television adaptation) and journalist	
July 12	Bob Booker	92	Writer	
July 13	Shannen Doherty	53	Actress best known as Brenda Walsh on Beverly Hills, 90210 and Prue Halliwell on Charmed	
July 13	Naomi Pomeroy	49	Chef and Top Chef Masters contestant	
July 13	James B. Sikking	90	Actor best known as Lt. Howard Hunter on Hill Street Blues and Dr. David Howser on Doogie Howser, M.D.	
July 13	Richard Simmons	76	Fitness personality. Television roles includes guest appearances on The Roseanne Show and General Hospital. Also appeared on informercials for his Sweating to the Oldies tapes and Deal-a-Meal.	
July 13	Bob Tischler	78	Television writer and producer best known for his work on Saturday Night Live	
July 15	Whitney Rydbeck	79	Actor (Far Out Space Nuts, Scrubs, 7th Heaven). He also played a crash test dummy in public service announcements for seat belt safety.	
July 16	Tom Fenton	94	CBS News correspondent	
July 18	Lou Dobbs	78	Television host on CNN and Fox Business (Lou Dobbs Tonight)	
July 18	Bob Newhart	94	Actor and comedian best known as the star of The Bob Newhart Show and Newhart. Also hosted a variety show and starred in the short lived shows Bob and George and Leo, and won a Primetime Emmy Award for his recurring role on The Big Bang Theory.	
July 19	Esta TerBlanche	51	South African actress best known as Gillian Andrassy on All My Children.	
July 22	Duke Fakir	88	Founding member of Motown group Four Tops. He and his groupmates were featured on the NBC special Motown 25: Yesterday, Today, Forever.	
July 28	Erica Ash	46	Actress best known as Mary Charles "M-Chuck" Calloway on Survivor's Remorse and as a cast member on The Big Gay Sketch Show and MADtv.	
July 28	Chino XL	50	Actor (The Young and the Restless, Reno 911!, CSI: Miami) and rapper.	
July 29	Robert Banas	90	Actor and dancer. He made numerous television appearances, including on The Judy Garland Show and Get Smart.	

== August ==
Date	Name	Age	Notes	Sources
August 1	Leonard Engelman	83	Makeup artist (Cagney & Lacey, The Shield).	
August 3	George Schenck	82	Television writer and producer (NCIS)	
August 4	Charles Cyphers	85	Actor (The Betty White Show, Wonder Woman, The Dukes of Hazzard)	
August 5	John Aprea	83	Actor (Matt Houston, Full House, Another World)	
August 5	Patti Yasutake	70	Actress best known as Alyssa Ogawa on Star Trek: The Next Generation	
August 6	Billy Bean	60	Baseball player and executive (I've Got a Secret)	
August 8	Mitzi McCall	93	Actress (Silk Stalkings, Alright Already)	
August 9	Jim Riswold	66	Advertising artist for Wieden+Kennedy (most notably developed the Mars Blackmon and Bo Knows campaigns for Nike)	
August 9	Kevin Sullivan	75	Professional wrestler (WCW, NWA, GCW)	
August 10	Rachael Lillis	55	Voice actress (Pokémon,Teenage Mutant Ninja Turtles, Chaotic)	
August 11	Ofra Bikel	94	Israeli-American filmmaker, most notably on documentaries for PBS' Frontline	
August 11	Ángel Salazar	68	Cuban-American actor and comedian (In Living Color, Last Comic Standing)	
August 12	Kim Kahana	94	Actor, stunt performer, and action choreographer best known as Chongo on Danger Island.	
August 13	Wally Amos	88	Television personality, entrepreneur, and author. Appeared as himself on shows like The Jeffersons, Taxi, and The Office. Hosted the adult reading program Learn to Read.	
August 14	Gena Rowlands	94	Actress (Robert Montgomery Presents, Laramie, Johnny Staccato)	
August 15	Peter Marshall	98	Entertainer and game show host, most notably of Hollywood Squares	
August 16	Afa Anoaʻi	80	WWE Hall of Fame professional wrestler	
August 18	Phil Donahue	88	Creator and host of The Phil Donahue Show	
August 21	John Amos	84	Actor (Maude, Good Times, The Mary Tyler Moore Show, Roots, Hunter, 704 Hauser, In the House, The West Wing, The District, All About the Andersons, Men in Trees)	
August 21	Roger Cook	70	Landscaper (appeared on This Old House)	
August 26	Sid Eudy	63	Professional wrestler (Sid Vicious in World Championship Wrestling; Sid Justice and Sycho Sid in World Wrestling Federation)	
August 27	Ron Hale	78	Actor best known as Roger Coleridge on Ryan's Hope and Mike Corbin on General Hospital	
August 27	Jim Houghton	75	Actor best known as Kenny Ward on Knots Landing	
August 28	Rusty Shoop	76	Meteorologist for KERO-TV/Bakersfield, California	
August 29	Johnny Gaudreau	31	NHL ice hockey player (Calgary Flames, Columbus Blue Jackets)	
August 30	Fatman Scoop	56	Rapper, hype man, and radio personality. He did voice work as himself on two episodes of The Boondocks.	
August 31	Sonny King	79	American professional wrestler	
August 31	Obi Ndefo	51	Actor best known as Bodie Wells on Dawson's Creek	

== September ==
Date	Name	Age	Notes	Sources
September 1	Eric Gilliland	62	Writer/producer (several series, most notably Roseanne)	
September 2	James Darren	88	Actor (The Time Tunnel, T. J. Hooker, Star Trek: Deep Space Nine)	
September 5	Screamin' Scott Simon	75	Singer (Sha Na Na). He and his groupmates hosted a syndicated variety show in the late '70s.	
September 8	Peter Renaday	89	Voice actor best known as Splinter and Vernon Fenwick on the original Teenage Mutant Ninja Turtles series	
September 9	John Cassaday	52	Comic book artist. He directed an episode of Dollhouse.	
September 9	James Earl Jones	93	Actor (Roots: The Next Generations, Gabriel's Fire, The Simpsons); longtime commercial spokesman for Bell Atlantic	
September 13	Michaela DePrince	29	Sierra Leonean-born ballet dancer. Appeared as herself on Dancing with the Stars.	
September 17	JD Souther	78	Singer-songwriter and actor (Thirtysomething, Purgatory, Nashville).	
September 19	Florence Warner	77	Singer (voice of the "Hello News" local station campaigns created by Gari Communications)	
September 20	Kathryn Crosby	90	Actress (The Bing Crosby Show, Great Performances, The Initiation of Sarah)	
September 20	David Graham	99	British actor ("Big Brother" in the "1984" Super Bowl commercial introducing the Apple Macintosh computer) and voice artist (Doctor Who, Fireball XL5, Peppa Pig)	
September 20	Eduardo Xol	58	Actor and designer. Appeared as himself on Extreme Makeover: Home Edition.	
September 21	Benny Golson	95	Musician and composer (Mannix, Ironside, M*A*S*H)	
September 26	John Ashton	76	Actor (M*A*S*H, Starsky & Hutch, Dallas)	
September 27	Maggie Smith	89	British actress (The Carol Burnett Show, Great Performances, My House in Umbria)	
September 28	Drake Hogestyn	70	Actor best known as John Black on Days of Our Lives	
September 28	Kris Kristofferson	88	Singer-songwriter and actor (Freedom Road, The Last Days of Frank and Jesse James, Amerika)	
September 29	Ron Ely	86	Actor best known as Tarzan on the 1960s TV series of the same name	
September 30	Gavin Creel	48	Actor (Eloise at the Plaza, Eloise at Christmastime, American Horror Stories). He also did voice work for Rapunzel's Tangled Adventure and Central Park.	
September 30	Frank Fritz	60	Antique picker (co-host of American Pickers)	
September 30	Dikembe Mutombo	58	Congolese-American basketball player. He appeared in commercials for GEICO and Mobil 1.	
September 30	Ken Page	70	Actor (Gimme a Break!, Sable, Family Matters). He also did voice work for Duckman and All Grown Up!.	

== October ==
Date	Name	Age	Notes	Sources
October 4	Allan Blye	87	Actor and writer best known as Captain Blye on Mister Rogers' Neighborhood.	
October 4	Christopher Ciccone	63	Artist, interior decorator, and designer. He made an appearance in The Janice Dickinson Modeling Agency.	
October 4	Yukio Hattori	78	Japanese television personality and food critic. He made an appearance in Season 2 of The Next Iron Chef.	
October 4	John Lasell	95	Actor best known as Peter Guthrie on Dark Shadows	
October 6	Dan Coughlin	86	Sportscaster (WJW) and journalist.	
October 7	Cissy Houston	91	Singer. She made guest appearances on shows like The Tonight Show Starring Johnny Carson, Late Show with David Letterman, and Oprah Prime.	
October 7	Nicholas Pryor	89	Actor best known as A. Milton Arnold on Beverly Hills, 90210	
October 10	Ethel Kennedy	96	Human rights advocate. She made a cameo in an episode of Cheers along with her son Michael.	
October 16	Sherry Coben	71	Writer (Ryan's Hope, Kate & Allie, Bailey Kipper's P.O.V.)	
October 16	Liam Payne	31	English singer and member of One Direction. He made guest appearances as himself on shows like iCarly, Dancing with the Stars, Family Guy, and Drop the Mic.	
October 17	Mitzi Gaynor	93	Actress, dancer, and entertainer. She appeared on The Ed Sullivan Show and starred in several television specials throughout the 1960s and 1970s.	
October 19	Mel Showers	78	News anchor (WKRG-TV)	
October 21	Mimi Hines	91	Canadian actress, singer, and comedian. She made guest appearances on shows like The Ed Sullivan Show, The Tonight Show, Frasier, and The Rosie O'Donnell Show.	
October 22	Lynda Obst	74	Film and television producer (Hot in Cleveland, The Soul Man, Helix)	
October 22	Alan Sacks	81	Writer-producer, most notably on Welcome Back, Kotter	
October 23	Jack Jones	86	Singer (theme from The Love Boat) and actor (The Rat Patrol, Police Woman, McMillan & Wife)	
October 24	Tom Jarriel	89	KPRC-TV and ABC News anchor/reporter	
October 24	Jeri Taylor	86	Writer (Star Trek: The Next Generation, Star Trek: Voyager) and producer (Quincy, M.E.).	
October 25	David Harris	75	Actor (Kojak, The White Shadow, Hill Street Blues)	
October 26	Jim Donovan	68	Sportscaster and news anchor (WKYC/Cleveland)	
October 29	Teri Garr	79	Actress best known as Phoebe Abbott on Friends; appeared in TV commercials for Fruit of the Loom panties	
October 30	Wally Kennedy	76	Television personality (WPVI-TV/Philadelphia)	

== November ==
Date	Name	Age	Notes	Sources
November 2	Alan Rachins	82	Actor best known as Douglas Brackman Jr. on L.A. Law and Larry Finkelstein on Dharma & Greg	
November 2	Jonathan Haze	95	Actor and writer. He made guest appearances in The Angry Beavers and more.	
November 3	Quincy Jones	91	Composer (The Bill Cosby Show, Ironside, Sanford and Son) and record producer, winner of one Emmy for Outstanding Music Composition for a Series for Roots in 1977. He also made guest appearances on The Boondocks and Last Call with Carson Daly; hosted an episode of Saturday Night Live during its 15th season in 1990; and was an executive producer for MADtv and The Fresh Prince of Bel-Air.	
November 5	Elwood Edwards	74	Voice actor. He made guest appearances on The Simpsons and The Tonight Show Starring Jimmy Fallon; worked at various local television stations, including WKYC; and appeared in a television commercial for Shopify.	
November 6	Tony Todd	69	Actor (21 Jump Street, Night Court, Matlock). He also did voice work for shows like Batman: The Brave and the Bold, Sym-Bionic Titan, Young Justice, and The Flash.	
November 7	John C. Hartigan	67	Visual effects artist and special effects coordinator (Hawaii Five-O)	
November 9	Ella Jenkins	100	Singer-songwriter. She made guest appearances on shows like Today, Showbiz Today, Barney & Friends, and Mister Rogers' Neighborhood.	
November 9	George Wilkins	90	Musician, arranger, and composer (The Adventures of Teddy Ruxpin)	
November 11	Richard D. James	88	American art director and production designer (Star Trek: The Next Generation, Star Trek: Voyager)	
November 11	John Peaslee	75	Television producer and screenwriter (Coach, Something So Right, Just Shoot Me!, 8 Simple Rules, According to Jim, Dog with a Blog, Liv and Maddie)	
November 12	Timothy West	90	English actor (Masada, The Tragedy of Flight 103: The Inside Story)	
November 15	Al Ferrara	84	Major League baseball player who played from 1963 to 1971. He made appearances on episodes of Gilligan's Island and Batman.	
November 15	Paul Teal	35	Actor best known as Josh Avery on One Tree Hill	
November 17	Jim Knaub	68	Former professional wheelchair marathon athlete and actor. (The A-Team, The Fall Guy, The Love Boat)	
November 20	Andy Paley	72	Composer (The Ren and Stimpy Show, SpongeBob SquarePants, Camp Lazlo), record producer, and songwriter	
November 22	Mark Withers	77	Actor (Dynasty, Days of Our Lives, Stranger Things)	
November 23	Chuck Woolery	83	Game show host (Wheel of Fortune, Love Connection, Scrabble, The Dating Game, Greed, Lingo)	
November 24	Helen Gallagher	98	Actress best known as Maeve Ryan on Ryan's Hope.	
November 25	Earl Holliman	96	Actor best known for Police Woman, Delta, and the premiere episode of The Twilight Zone	
November 25	Hal Lindsey	95	Author and televangelist. He hosted International Intelligence Briefing on the Trinity Broadcasting Network.	
November 26	Jim Abrahams	80	Director and screenwriter (Big John, Little John, Police Squad!)	
November 26	Scott L. Schwartz	65	Actor (Nash Bridges, The Tick, The Young and the Restless), stuntman, and professional wrestler.	
November 29	Marshall Brickman	85	Director and screenwriter (Candid Camera, The Tonight Show, and The Dick Cavett Show)	
November 29	Christian Juttner	60	Actor (Bewitched, Emergency!, The Bionic Woman, ABC Afterschool Special)	
November 29	Wayne Northrop	77	Actor (Dynasty, Days of Our Lives, Port Charles)	
November 30	Steve Alaimo	84	Singer and record producer. He hosted and co-produced Where The Action Is.	

== December ==
Date	Name	Age	Notes	Sources
December 1	Kelly Powers	45	Podiatric surgeon and commentator for Fox News.	
December 2	Paul Maslansky	91	Film producer and writer. Produced The Gun and the Pulpit and King; was an executive producer for CBS Schoolbreak Special, Police Academy, and Police Academy: The Series.	
December 5	Thom Christopher	84	Actor best known as Carlo Hesser on One Life to Live.	
December 5	Bill Melton	79	Professional baseball player and sports commentator. He commentated on White Sox broadcasts for NBC Sports Chicago.	
December 8	Jill Jacobson	70	Actress (The New Gidget, Falcon Crest, Star Trek: The Next Generation, Star Trek: Deep Space Nine)	
December 9	Nikki Giovanni	81	Writer, poet, activist, and educator. She made appearances on shows like Soul! and The Tonight Show with Johnny Carson.	
December 10	Michael Cole	84	Actor best known as Peter Cochran on The Mod Squad.	
December 10	The Amazing Kreskin	89	Mentalist. He appeared on The Tonight Show Starring Johnny Carson, Late Show with David Letterman, The Mike Douglas Show and The Merv Griffin Show.	
December 13	Diane Delano	67	Actress best known as Sergent Barbara Semanski on Northern Exposure.	
December 15	Aziza Barnes	32	Poet and playwright. They wrote for shows like Snowfall and Teenage Bounty Hunters.	
December 16	Anita Bryant	84	Singer and conservative activist.	
December 16	Jean Jennings	70	Journalist, publisher and television personality.	
December 20	John Erwin	88	Voice actor (The Archie Show, Sabrina the Teenage Witch, He-Man and the Masters of the Universe)	
December 21	Art Evans	82	Actor (M*A*S*H, Hill Street Blues, A Different World, Everybody Hates Chris)	
December 21	Hudson Meek	16	Actor (MacGyver, Legacies, Genius, Found)	
December 22	Geoffrey Deuel	81	Actor best known as Dave Campbell on The Young and the Restless.	
December 24	Richard M. Cohen	76	Journalist and television producer (CBS News, CNN)	
December 26	Dick Capri	93	Actor and comedian. He made appearances on shows like The Merv Griffin Show and The Ed Sullivan Show.	
December 27	Greg Gumbel	78	Sportscaster (most notably with CBS Sports)	
December 27	Olivia Hussey	73	British actress best known as Norma Bates on Psycho IV: The Beginning. She voiced Talia al Ghul in the DC Animated Universe.	
December 28	Charles Dolan	98	Businessman, founder of Cablevision and HBO.	
December 29	Aaron Brown	76	Broadcast journalist (most notably with ABC News and CNN)	
December 29	Jimmy Carter	100	39th President of the United States and 76th Governor of Georgia; made a guest appearance on an episode of Home Improvement and once appeared as a mystery guest on What's My Line?.	
December 29	Linda Lavin	87	Actress and singer best known as Alice Hyatt on Alice.	
December 30	John Capodice	83	Actor (General Hospital, Seinfeld, The West Wing, CSI: Crime Scene Investigation)	

== See also ==
- 2024 deaths in the United States
- 2024 in American television
