= John Hartigan =

John Hartigan may refer to:

== People ==
- John A. Hartigan (born 1937), Australian-American statistician
- John Patrick Hartigan (1887–1968), American jurist
- John Hartigan, American captain of 1911 Boston College football team
- John Hartigan (rowing) (1940–2020), American coxswain
- John Hartigan (media executive) (born 1947), Australian journalist
- John C. Hartigan, American Emmy nominee in 2014 Primetime Emmy Award for Outstanding Special Visual Effects
- John Hartigan, Australian director of Land Registry, subordinate in 2001 to Elizabeth O'Keeffe
- John Hartigan, English Labour Party candidate in Shipston ward of 2017 Warwickshire County Council election

== Characters ==
- John Hartigan (Sin City), major protagonist in 1990s American graphic novels by Frank Miller
