= Boku =

Boku may refer to:

- Bōku, a board game
- Boku (juice), a juice carton drink
- Boku, Inc., a San Francisco, California-based mobile payments company
- University of Natural Resources and Life Sciences, Vienna (Universität für Bodenkultur Wien; BOKU)
- Shō Boku (1739–1794), king of Ryukyu
- Boku, the former codename of Kodu, a child-oriented programming environment from Microsoft
- A first-person Japanese pronoun, with an implication of boyishness
