= Jason Westrol =

American basketball player (born 1988)

Personal information
- Born: June 20, 1988 (age 37) Elizabeth, New Jersey, U.S.
- Listed height: 6 ft 3 in (1.91 m)
- Listed weight: 205 lb (93 kg)

Career information
- High school: Manasquan (Manasquan, New Jersey)
- College: Bentley (2006–2010)
- NBA draft: 2010: undrafted
- Playing career: 2010–2015
- Position: Shooting guard

Career history
- 2010–2011: CSU Ploiești
- 2012–2013: Cuva Houthalen
- 2013–2015: Leuven Bears
- 2015: Le Mans Sarthe Basket
- 2015: Limburg United

Career highlights
- NABC Division II Player of the Year (2010)

Jason Westrol (born June 20, 1988) is an American professional basketball player who last played for the Limburg United of the Belgian Basketball League.

Raised in Brielle, New Jersey, Westrol attended Manasquan High School, where he was part of the team that won the Group II state championship during his sophomore year.
