= Ruth Taylor =

Ruth Taylor may refer to:

- Ruth Taylor (poet) (1961–2006), Canadian poet, editor and college professor
- Ruth Taylor (actress) (1905–1984), American film actress, starred in silent movies
- Ruth Ashton Taylor (1922–2024), American television journalist
- Ruth Carol Taylor (1931–2023), first African-American airline stewardess in the United States
