= Squan Beach Life-Saving Station =

- Squan Beach Life-Saving Station #9
- U.S. National Register of Historic Places
- New Jersey Register of Historic Places
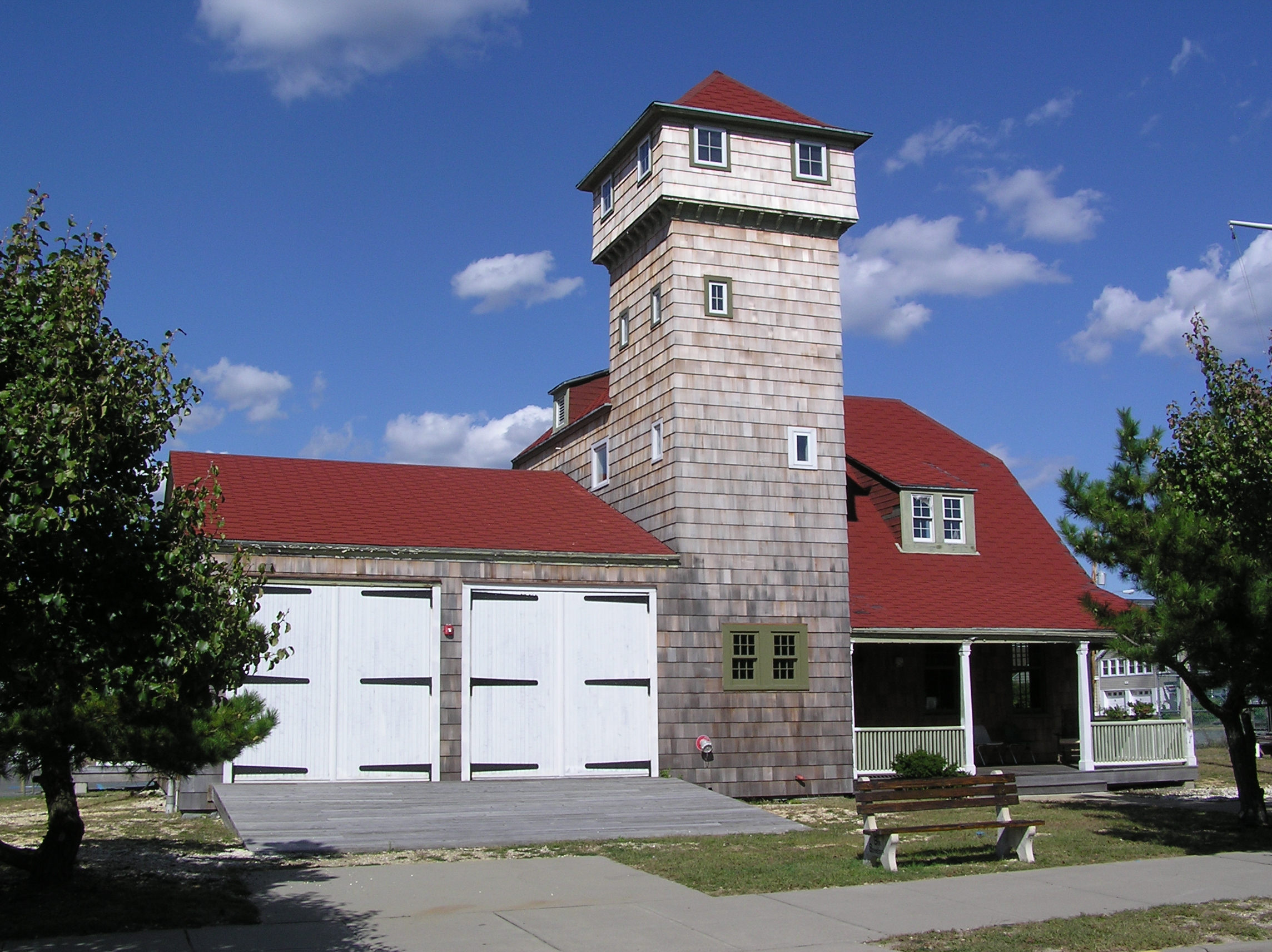

- Location within Monmouth County, New Jersey Location within New Jersey Location within the United States
- Location: Ocean & 2nd Avenues, Manasquan, New Jersey
- Coordinates: 40°7′3″N 74°2′2″W
- Area: less than one acre
- Architect: Tolman, George
- Architectural style: Shingle Style
- NRHP reference No.: 08000135
- NJRHP No.: 4759

Significant dates
- Added to NRHP: March 5, 2008
- Designated NJRHP: December 21, 2007

Squan Beach Life-Saving Station #9 is located in Manasquan, Monmouth County, New Jersey, United States. The station was added to the National Register of Historic Places on March 5, 2008.

== See also ==
- National Register of Historic Places listings in Monmouth County, New Jersey
