= Glenn Hedden =

American football coach and athletic director

Biographical details
- Born: January 4, 1950 (age 76)

Coaching career (HC unless noted)
- 1976–1986: Montclair State (assistant)
- 1987–1988: Kean

Administrative career (AD unless noted)
- 1989–2011: Kean

Head coaching record
- Overall: 13–8

Accomplishments and honors

Championships
- 1 NJAC (1987)

Glenn Hedden (born January 4, 1950) is a former head football coach and athletic director for the Kean University Cougars in Union, New Jersey. In his two seasons as head coach (1987–88), he compiled a record of 13–8 and led the Cougars to their first ever New Jersey Athletic Conference title in his first year on the job. Prior to Kean, Hedden was an assistant football coach at Montclair State University for 11 years.

At Montclair State, he acquired a B.A. in both physical education and health, and a master's degree in administration. Hedden is currently living in Manasquan, New Jersey with his wife Deborah.

== Head coaching record ==
Year	Team	Overall	Conference	Standing	Bowl/playoffs
Kean Cougars (New Jersey Athletic Conference) (1987–1988)
1987	Kean	9–2	5–1	1st	L ECAC Championship
1988	Kean	4–6	2–4	T–5th	
Kean:		13–8	7–5		
Total:		13–8			
