= Shayne Pospisil =

- Born: May 15, 1985 (age 41); Manasquan, New Jersey, U.S.
- Known for: Professional snowboarder, surfer and skateboarder
- Height: 5 ft 8.5 in (1.74 m)
- Website: Shayne Pospisil Personal Website

Shayne "Pizzle" Pospisil (born May 15, 1985) is an American all-around snowboarder.

== Early years ==
Pospisil trained at the Okemo Mountain School, also known as the Snowboard Academy.

== Snowboarding career ==
Pospisil has competed against some of the leading competitors in snowboarding including Travis Rice, Bjorn Leines, and Shaun White. His biggest accomplishment was at the, arguably the biggest urban snowboard event in North America. He beat the competition, performing a frontside 900, a backside 900, and a combination finale to capture the top prize in front of 20,000 people in New York City's East River Park.

He admires extreme athletes like Kelly Slater, Danny Kass and Tony Hawk, who have helped put their respective sports on the map, and he credits most of his success to the dedication of his family. While Shayne can thank snowboarding for his recent success and notoriety, he is quick to mention that his first love lies with surfing. He was a competitive surfer before he began competing in snowboarding.

== Awards and Championships ==
Year	Competition	Championship/Medal
2005	Junior Worlds- Big Air	2nd Place
2007	Garnier Fructis Australian Open	9th Place
2007	Paul Mitchell Progression Session	Champion
2008	Stylewars by Oakley	4th Place
2008	Oakley Arctic Challenge	2nd Overall
2008	King of Quarters	Champion
2008	World Quarterpipe Championships	2nd Place
2009	Billabong Air and Style	6th Place
2009	Ultimate Boarder- Overall	4th Place
2009	Ultimate Boarder- Snowboarding	2nd Place
2009	Oakley Arctic Challenge- Highest Air	Champion
2009	Red Bull Snowscrapers	Champion
