= Hal Thompson =

American football player (1922–2006)

Profile
- Position: End / Defensive end

Personal information
- Born: October 18, 1922; Manasquan, New Jersey
- Died: April 26, 2006 (aged 83); Rehoboth Beach, Delaware
- Listed height: 6 ft 1 in (1.85 m)
- Listed weight: 205 lb (93 kg)

Career information
- High school: Manasquan (Manasquan, New Jersey)
- College: Delaware

Career history
- Brooklyn Dodgers (1947–1948)

Career statistics
- Receptions: 19
- Receiving yards: 185
- Touchdowns: 1
- Games played: 21
- Stats at Pro Football Reference

Harold Charles "Hal" Thompson (October 18, 1922 – April 26, 2006) was an American football end and defensive end who played for two seasons in the National Football League (NFL). He played for the Brooklyn Dodgers from 1948 to 1949.

He played football at Manasquan High School and college football for the Delaware Fightin' Blue Hens.
