= Manasquan High School =

High school in Monmouth County, New Jersey, US

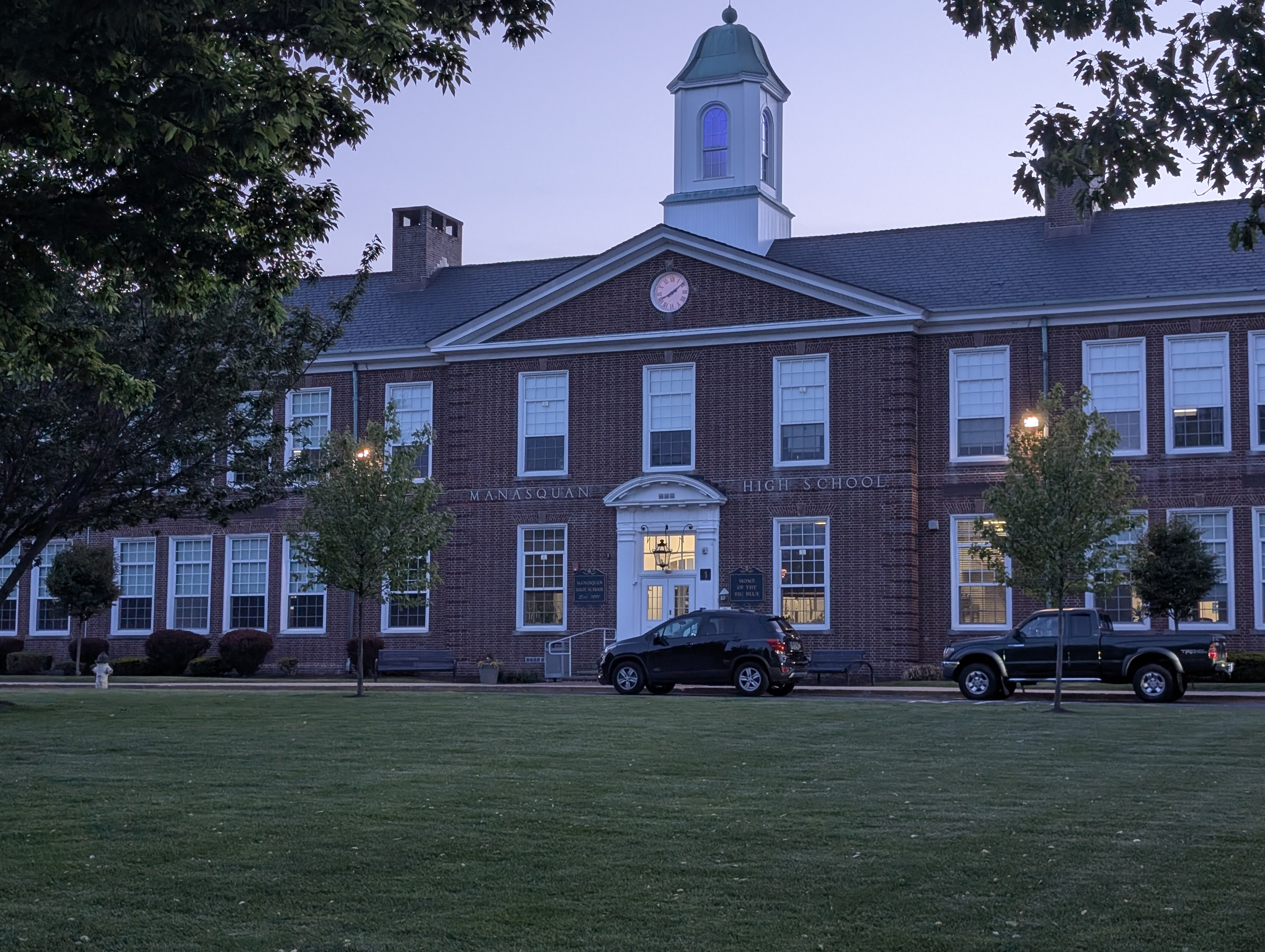

Location
- 167 Broad Street; Manasquan, Monmouth County, New Jersey 08736; United States; 40.128476°N 74.048019°W

Information
- Type: Public high school
- Established: 1931
- School district: Manasquan Public Schools
- NCES School ID: 340942003940
- Principal: Matt Kukoda
- Faculty: 79.2 FTEs
- Grades: 9–12
- Enrollment: 917 (as of 2024–25)
- Student to teacher ratio: 11.6:1
- Colors: Navy and gray
- Athletics conference: Shore Conference
- Mascot: Manasquan Warrior
- Team name: Warriors
- Rival: Wall High School
- Website: mhs.manasquanschools.org

Manasquan High School is a four-year comprehensive community public high school that serves students in ninth through twelfth grade from Manasquan, in Monmouth County, in the U.S. state of New Jersey, operating as the lone high school of the Manasquan Public Schools. In addition to students from Manasquan, the high school also serves students from Avon-by-the-Sea, Belmar, Brielle, Lake Como, Sea Girt, Spring Lake and Spring Lake Heights, who attend Manasquan High School as part of sending/receiving relationships with their respective districts.

As of the 2024–25 school year, the school had an enrollment of 917 students and 79.2 classroom teachers (on an FTE basis), for a student–teacher ratio of 11.6:1. There were 130 students (14.2% of enrollment) eligible for free lunch and 15 (1.6% of students) eligible for reduced-cost lunch.

== History ==
Manasquan High School opened at its current site in 1931.

Students from Wall Township, New Jersey had attended the school until Wall High School opened in September 1959 for grades 7-11, while students in twelfth grade that year attended Manasquan High School. The Manasquan district ended the sending/receiving relationship with Wall in 1957, due to overcrowding at the Manasquan school, which went into effect when the new Wall High School was opened.

Manasquan High School had been accredited by the Middle States Association of Colleges and Schools Commission on Elementary and Secondary Schools from 1935 until 2011, when the school's accreditation status was removed.

== Awards, recognition, and rankings ==
The school was the 143rd-ranked public high school in New Jersey out of 339 schools statewide in New Jersey Monthly magazine's September 2014 cover story on the state's "Top Public High Schools," using a new ranking methodology. The school had been ranked 145th in the state of 328 schools in 2012, after being ranked 124th in 2010 out of 322 schools listed. The magazine ranked the school 115th in 2008 out of 316 schools. The school was ranked 108th in the magazine's September 2006 issue, which surveyed 316 schools across the state. Schooldigger.com ranked the school tied for 58th out of 381 public high schools statewide in its 2011 rankings (an increase of three positions from the 2010 ranking) which were based on the combined percentage of students classified as proficient or above proficient on the mathematics (91.8%) and language arts literacy (96.3%) components of the High School Proficiency Assessment (HSPA).

In 1996–97, Manasquan High School's Horticultural Botany program, taught at Barlow's Flower Farm, was recognized by the New Jersey Department of Education as a "Best Practice" of educational partnership.

== Curriculum ==
The Course Ahead Program allows seniors to take courses in European and American History, Calculus, and Entrepreneurship at Georgian Court College and earn up to 12 college credits.

Students have the option to take Advanced Placement (AP) courses in their Junior and Senior years. After taking these classes, students can take the national administered AP examinations, which can earn students credit at most institutions of higher learning (the exact score required for credit may vary depending on the college or university). The high school offers AP courses in Language and Composition, Literature, World History, United States History, Psychology, Chemistry, Biology, Computer Science, Calculus (AB and, more recently, BC), Spanish, and French.

The Academy of Finance program focuses on the field of finance, using a curriculum that combines traditional classroom instruction, with lectures from experts in the subject, mentoring and job shadowing with industry specialists. Students gain practical knowledge and skills through a paid summer internship that is required as part of the program. Students are awarded a Certificate in Financial Studies upon satisfactory completion of the Academy curriculum mandates.

By the 2024-25 school year, the school plans to have an International Baccalaureate program for its junior and senior students to earn college credit.

== Extracurricular activities ==
Manasquan High School offers many clubs and after school activities. Clubs include the Drama Club, Environmental Club, Film Club, Friends Helping Friends, Amnesty International, Ping-Pong Club, History Club, Mock Trial, Model United Nations, Key Club, the National Honor Society, the Academy of Finance (see below), DECA, Academic Team, and others.

=== Athletics ===
The Manasquan High School Warriors compete in Division A Central of the Shore Conference, an athletic conference comprised of public and private high schools in Monmouth and Ocean counties along the Jersey Shore. The conference operates under the jurisdiction of the New Jersey State Interscholastic Athletic Association (NJSIAA). With 685 students in grades 10-12, the school was classified by the NJSIAA for the 2019–20 school year as Group II for most athletic competition purposes, which included schools with an enrollment of 486 to 758 students in that grade range. The school was classified by the NJSIAA as Group II South for football for 2024–2026, which included schools with 514 to 685 students.

The school participates as the host school / lead agency in joint cooperative boys / girls bowling, gymnastics, ice hockey and boys / girls swimming teams with Point Pleasant Beach High School. These co-op programs operate under agreements scheduled to expire at the end of the 2023–24 school year.

The school is known for its sports rivalry with Wall High School in Wall Township. The rivalry culminates every year on Thanksgiving, where the football teams face off with MHS always holding their homecoming, whether they are the home or away team. The football rivalry with Wall dates back to 2001 and was listed at 10th on NJ.com's list "Ranking the 31 fiercest rivalries in N.J. HS football". Wall leads the series with an overall record of 8-7 through the 2017 season. The school has had a longstanding rivalry with Point Pleasant Boro High School.

The boys baseball team won the Central Jersey Group III state sectional championship in 1969, won the Group II state championship in 1986 (defeating runner-up Jefferson Township High School in the finals) and 2017 (vs. Whippany Park High School). The 1986 team won the Group III title with a 6-0 win against Jefferson Township in the championship game played at Princeton University. the team won the 2017 Group II title with a 7-3 win against Whippany Park in the playoff finals at Toms River High School East.

The girls tennis team won the Group III state championship in 1976 (defeating runner-up James Caldwell High School in the tournament's final round), in Group II in 1995 (vs. Moorestown High School) and 2006 (vs. Bernards High School). The 1995 team won the Tournament of Champions, defeating runner-up Ramapo High School. The 1995 team won the Group II state title at Mercer County Park with a 4-1 victory against Millburn High School in the semifinals before defeating Moorestown 5-0 in the finals. The team finished the season with a record of 27-0 after defeating Cherry Hill High School East in the semifinals and beating Ramapo 3-2 in the finals to win the overall state title.

The boys tennis team won the Group III state championship in 1976, defeating Collingswood High School in the tournament final; The team lost to Christian Brothers Academy for the overall state title.

The girls field hockey team won the Central Jersey Group III state sectional title in 1976, and won the Central Jersey Group II titles in 1990, 1995 and 1998.

The girls basketball team won the Group II state championship in 1987 (against Jefferson Township High School in the finals), 1988 (vs. Jefferson Township), 2014 (vs. Newton High School), 2015 (vs. Westwood Regional High School), 2016 (vs. High Point Regional High School), 2017 (vs. High Point), 2018 (vs. Newark Tech High School), (vs. Jeffesron Township) and 2024 (vs. Madison High School), and won the Group III title in 2012 (vs. Teaneck High School). The program's nine state titles are tied for fourth-most in the state. The 1987 team finished the season with a 27-3 record after winning the Group III title with a 71-49 win against Jefferson in the championship game at Rider College.

The football team won the NJSIAA Central Jersey Group II state sectional championship in 1990, 1991, 1993, 1998-2002, 2005, 2008 and 2016, as well as the South Jersey Group II title in 2006. The 2005, 2006, 2008, 2009, and 2010 teams all won divisional championships. The 2001 team finished the season with a record of 11-1 after winning the Central Jersey Group II sectional title with a 14-0 victory against Ridge High School in the championship game at Kean University. The 2006 team went 12-0 and won the Central Jersey Group II state sectional title with a 28–0 win over West Deptford High School in the sectional title game, one of 10 state titles won by coach Vic Kubu during his 22-year tenure at Manasquan before his death in 2007. The 2008 football team also won the Central Jersey Group II sectional title, coming from a touchdown behind at the half to a 19–14 win against Arthur L. Johnson High School at Rutgers Stadium, the program's 11th sectional title. The team won the program's 12th title in 2016 with a 42–6 win against Bernards High School in the Central Jersey Group II tournament final.

The 2007 girls tennis team won the Central Jersey, Group II state sectional championship with a 3–2 win over Rumson-Fair Haven Regional High School in the tournament final.

The ice hockey team won the Dowd Cup in 2008, 2018 and 2019.

The girls bowling team was Group I state champion in 2014 and 2016.

The boys bowling team won the Group I state championship in 2017.

The Manasquan Warrior Band performs at all football games, playing music both in the stands and during halftime. The Manasquan High School Warrior Band has performed a Queen Extravaganza themed show, in which songs include Don't Stop Me Now, Bohemian Rhapsody, Bicycle Race, We Are the Champions, and the Manasquan High School "School Song". The band has a repertoire of over 70 songs. The Warrior Band Drum Line also features a Percussion Ensemble using trash cans instead of drums, called Big Bang, as a part of the Warrior Jazz Band.

== Administration ==
The school's principal is Matt Kukoda. His administration team includes two assistant principals.

== Notable alumni ==
- Darius Adams (born 2006, class of 2025), college basketball player for the Maryland Terrapins
- John C. Bogle (1929–2019), investor, business magnate and philanthropist, who was the founder and chief executive of The Vanguard Group
- Doris Burke (born 1965, class of 1983), sideline reporter and color analyst who was the first woman to serve as a game analyst on television for a championship final (the 2024 NBA Finals)
- William T. Doyle (1926–2024), member of the Vermont Senate from the Washington Vermont Senate District from 1969 to 2017, making him the longest-serving state legislator in Vermont history
- Ryan Flores (born 1987), professional stock car racing driver and crew member who competes in the SMART Modified Tour
- Barbara Friedrich (born 1949, class of 1967), athlete who won the gold medal at the 1967 Pan American Games in the javelin and competed at the 1968 Summer Olympics in Mexico City
- Alexis Krauss (born 1985, class of 2003), lead singer for Sleigh Bells
- Marina Mabrey (born 1996, class of 2015), basketball player who has played for the Connecticut Sun of the Women's National Basketball Association
- Jack Nicholson (born 1937, class of 1954), actor and three-time Oscar Award winner
- Beth Peters (1931–2024, class of 1949), actress who appeared on General Hospital
- Jonathan Rechner (1972–2016, class of 1991), professional wrestler better known by his ring name Balls Mahoney
- Valentina Sánchez (born 1995), model, television producer and beauty pageant titleholder
- Rusty Schweickart (born 1935, class of 1952), astronaut who was the Lunar Module pilot on the 1969 Apollo 9 mission
- Joseph Steinberg (1883–1932), lawyer and politician who served in the New York State Assembly
- Neal Sterling (born 1992, class of 2010), wide receiver who has played in the NFL for the Jacksonville Jaguars and New York Jets
- Hal Thompson (1922–2006, class of 1940), football player who played for two seasons in the NFL for the Brooklyn Dodgers
- Mark Tornillo (born 1954, class of 1972), singer and vocalist of heavy metal band Accept
- Jason Westrol (born 1988, class of 2006), professional basketball player who has played for the Limburg United of the Belgian Basketball League
