= Beth Peters =

American actress (1931–2024)

Beth Trafford Peters
- Born: Mary Elizabeth Trafford; April 20, 1931; Manasquan, New Jersey, U.S.
- Died: March 14, 2024 (aged 92); Florida, U.S.
- Education: Manasquan High School
- Occupation: Actress
- Years active: 1955–2024
- Spouse: Jack Danon (died 1996)
- Children: 3

Beth Trafford Peters (born Mary Elizabeth Trafford; April 20, 1931 – March 14, 2024) was an American actress.

== Early life and education ==
Born Mary Elizabeth Trafford in Manasquan, New Jersey on April 20, 1931, Peters started her acting and singing career as a teenager at Manasquan High School, where she performed in school plays and graduated in 1949.

== Career ==
She first appeared on Broadway as an extra on Inherit the Wind, later portraying Mrs. Brady in the show. In the early 1980s, Peters appeared in eight episodes of General Hospital as the character Mrs. Whitaker. Peters acted in regional theaters for much of her career, appearing on stage at venues including the Sacramento Music Circus, Circle Star Theatre and the Carousel Theater. Her television credits include Mr. Belvedere, Quantum Leap, Hart to Hart, Simon and Simon, Highway to Heaven and The Waltons. Peters portrayed the role Mrs. Paroo in The Music Man more than 20 times. Her other musical appearances include Sound of Music, Big River, Show Boat, and Funny Girl. She also appeared in films, including Where Love Has Gone, Fitzwilly and Back to School. Peters was a longstanding member of the Actor’s Equity Association, Screen Actors Guild and the American Federation of Television and Radio Artists.

== Personal life and death ==
Peters' husband actor Jack Danon predeceased her in 1996. She had one child and two stepchildren. Peters resided in Ocala, Florida as of 2005.

Peters died after a brief illness in Florida, on March 14, 2024, at the age of 92.

== Selected filmography ==
- Inherit the Wind
- General Hospital
- Mr. Belvedere
- Quantum Leap
- Hart to Hart
- Simon & Simon
- Highway to Heaven
- The Waltons
- The Music Man
- Where Love Has Gone
- Fitzwilly
- Back to School
