= Kieran Shea =

American science fiction writer

Kieran James Shea (born 1965 in Manasquan, New Jersey) is an author of science fiction who lives in the United States.

He has published short fiction in Ellery Queen's Mystery Magazine, Thuglit, Dogmatika and Crimefactory. Shea was twice nominated for the storySouth Million Writers Award.

His first novel, the 2014 sci-fi thriller Koko Takes a Holiday, was the first in a series about the ex-mercenary Koko Martstellar, and was followed by a sequel, Koko the Mighty, in 2015. Publishers Weekly's review of Koko Takes a Holiday appreciated the "vigorous anarchic pulse" of Shea's narration, but considered that the story and setting, with its "many borrowed elements", held no surprises. The Library Journal's mention of the sequel noted its "well-developed characters and nonstop action".

== Works ==
=== Novels ===
Koko Martstellar series

1. Koko Takes a Holiday, Titan Books (2014), ISBN 978-1-78116-860-8
2. Koko the Mighty, Titan Books (2015), ISBN 978-1-78116-862-2
3. Koko Uncaged, Titan Books (2018), ISBN 978-1-78565-374-2

others

1. Off Rock, Titan Books (2017), ISBN 978-1-78565-338-4
