= Dick Capri =

American actor and comedian (1931–2024)

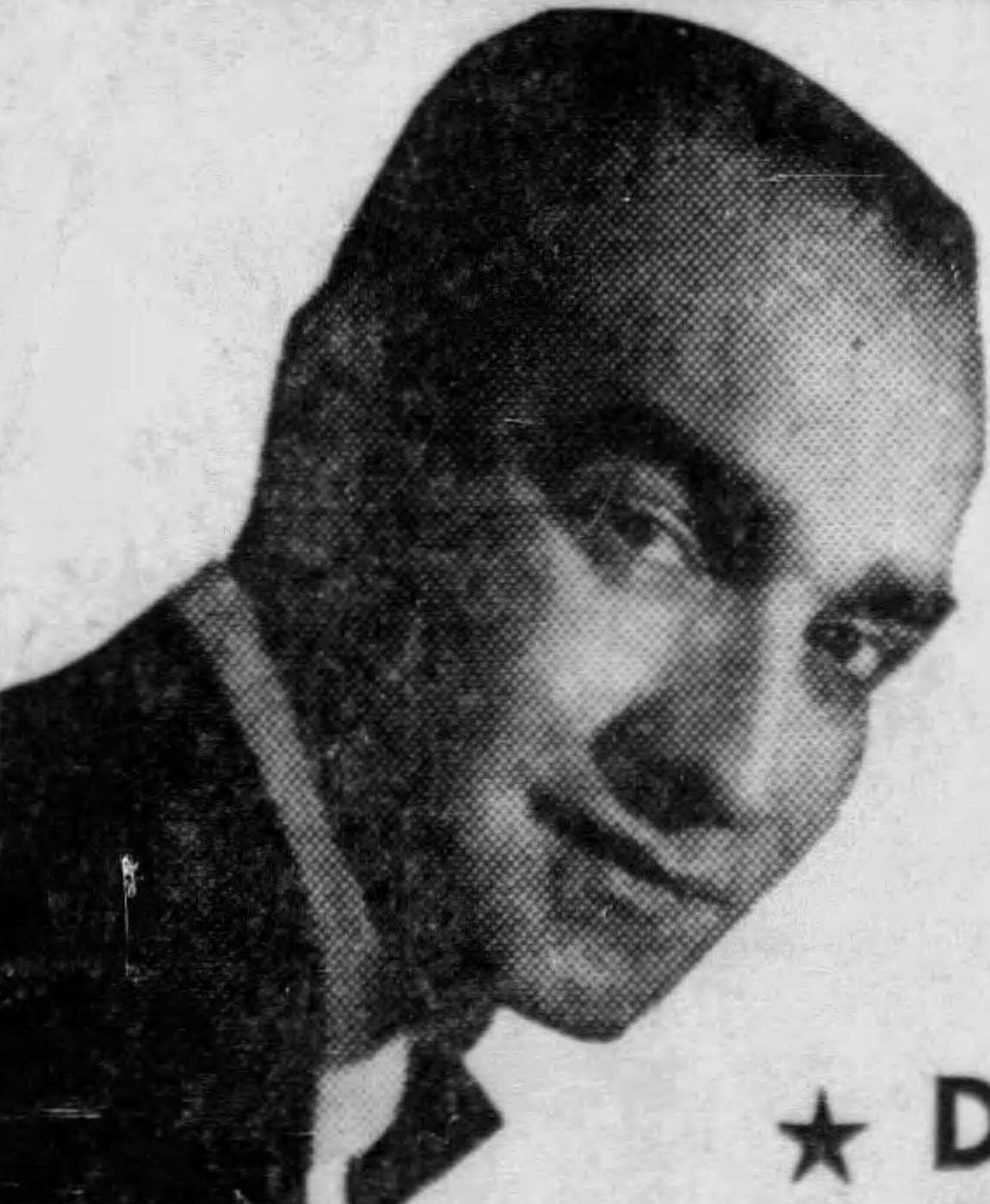
- Capri in 1961
- Born: Richard Emerick Crupi; August 11, 1931; Reading, Pennsylvania, U.S.
- Died: December 26, 2024 (aged 93); Boca Raton, Florida, U.S.
- Children: 1

Comedy career
- Years active: c. 1950s–2021
- Medium: Stand-up; television
- Website: realdickcapri.com

Richard Emerick Crupi (August 11, 1931 – December 26, 2024), known professionally as Dick Capri, was an American actor and comedian. With a career spanning several decades, Capri has performed in major comedy clubs, theaters, and television programs, gaining recognition. He was a frequent performer on The Ed Sullivan Show and The Tonight Show Starring Johnny Carson. Capri also gained prominence as part of the Broadway show Catskills on Broadway, where he showcased his talent alongside other legendary comedians. He continued to perform until 2021.

== Life and career ==
Richard Emerick Crupi was born to an Italian-American family in Reading, Pennsylvania, on August 11, 1931. After graduating high school, he moved to New York City and began performing stand-up.

In the 1960s, he appeared on such programs as The Merv Griffin Show and The Ed Sullivan Show. He worked with Engelbert Humperdinck, Frank Sinatra, Liza Minnelli, and Tom Jones, and performed for presidents Gerald Ford and George H. W. Bush. He performed largely at resorts in the Catskills, and was later part of a revue called Catskills on Broadway. He continued to perform until 2021.

Capri was married and divorced twice, to Barbara Cappinger and April Rand; he had a son (with Barbara) comedian Jeff Capri. He has a brother Frank Crupi and niece Elena Crupi. Capri died from an aortic dissection at his home in Boca Raton, Florida, on December 26, 2024, at the age of 93.

== Filmography ==
=== Film ===
Year	Name	Role
1987	They Still Call Me Bruce	Sam
2005	Bittersweet Place	Jerry
2005	Christ In The City	Altercooker
2010	One Angry Man	Bailiff

=== Television ===
Year	Name	Role	Notes
1963	Talent Scouts	Himself	1 episode
1965–1977	The Mike Douglas Show	Himself	2 episodes
1965–1970	The Merv Griffin Show	Himself	11 episodes
1965	ABC's Nightlife	Himself	1 episode
1966	The Ed Sullivan Show	Himself	2 episodes
1969	The Dennis Wholey Show	Himself	1 episode
1979	The Comedy Shop	Himself	1 episode
1992	Indecision '92: Election Night	Himself	
1992	Alan King: Inside the Comedy Mind	Himself	1 episode
1993	The Jerry Lewis MDA Labor Day Telethon	Himself	1 episode
1993	Catskills on Broadway	Himself	
1998	The N.Y. Friars Club roast of Drew Carey	Himself	
2001	Now That's Funny! The Living Legends of Stand-up Comedy	Himself	
2013	When Comedy Went to School	Himself	
2017	I Am Battle Comic	Himself	
