= Manasquan, New Jersey =

Borough in Monmouth County, New Jersey, US

- Borough
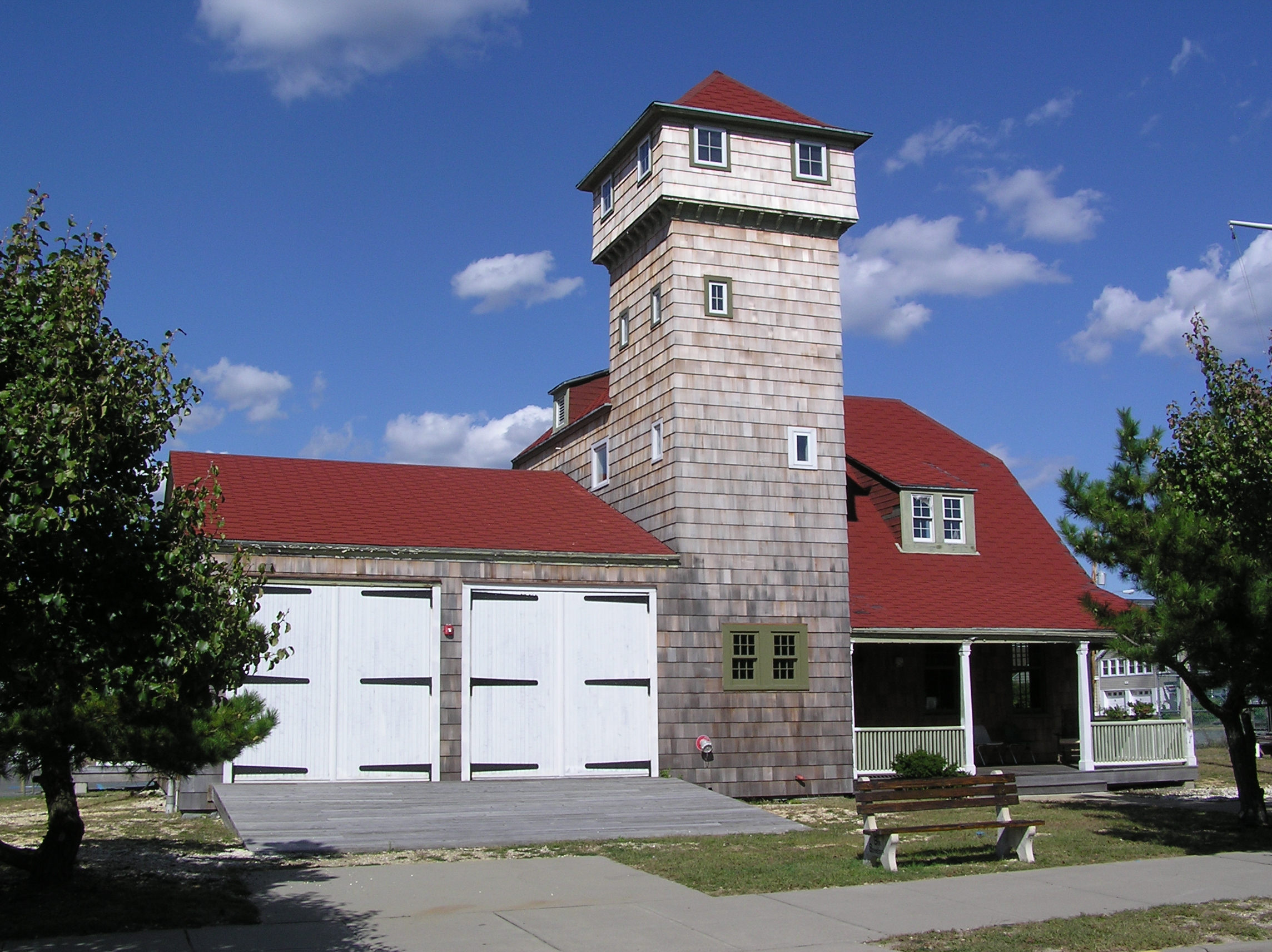
- The Squan Beach Life-Saving Station

- Seal

- Location of Manasquan in Monmouth County highlighted in red (left). Inset map: Location of Manasquan County in New Jersey highlighted in orange (right).

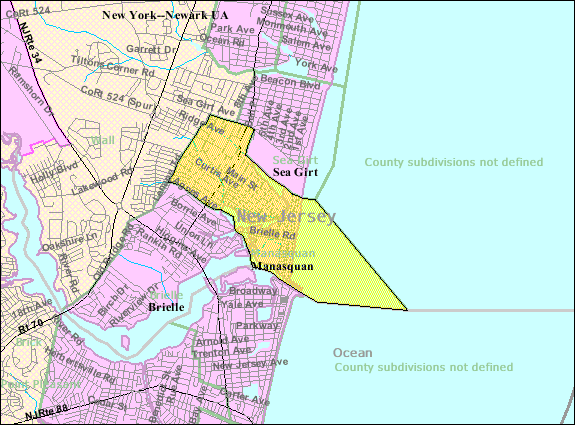
- Census Bureau map of Manasquan, New Jersey

- Location in Monmouth County Location in New Jersey Location in the United States
- Coordinates: 40.113032°N 74.036886°W
- Country: United States
- State: New Jersey
- County: Monmouth
- Incorporated: December 30, 1887

Government
  - Type: Borough
  - Body: Borough Council
  - Mayor: Michael Mangan (D, term ends December 31, 2027)
  - Administrator: Thomas Flarity
  - Municipal clerk: Nancy Acciavatti

Area
  - Total: 2.53 sq mi (6.54 km^{2})
  - Land: 1.38 sq mi (3.57 km^{2})
  - Water: 1.15 sq mi (2.97 km^{2}) 45.26%
  - Rank: 373rd of 565 in state 24th of 53 in county
- Elevation: 3 ft (0.91 m)

Population (2020)
  - Total: 5,938
  - Estimate (2023): 5,877
  - Rank: 349th of 565 in state 29th of 53 in county
  - Density: 4,302.9/sq mi (1,661.4/km^{2})
  - Rank: 143rd of 565 in state 14th of 53 in county
- Time zone: UTC−05:00 (Eastern (EST))
  - Summer (DST): UTC−04:00 (Eastern (EDT))
- ZIP Code: 08736
- Area code: 732
- FIPS code: 3402543050
- GNIS feature ID: 0885289
- Website: www.manasquan-nj.gov

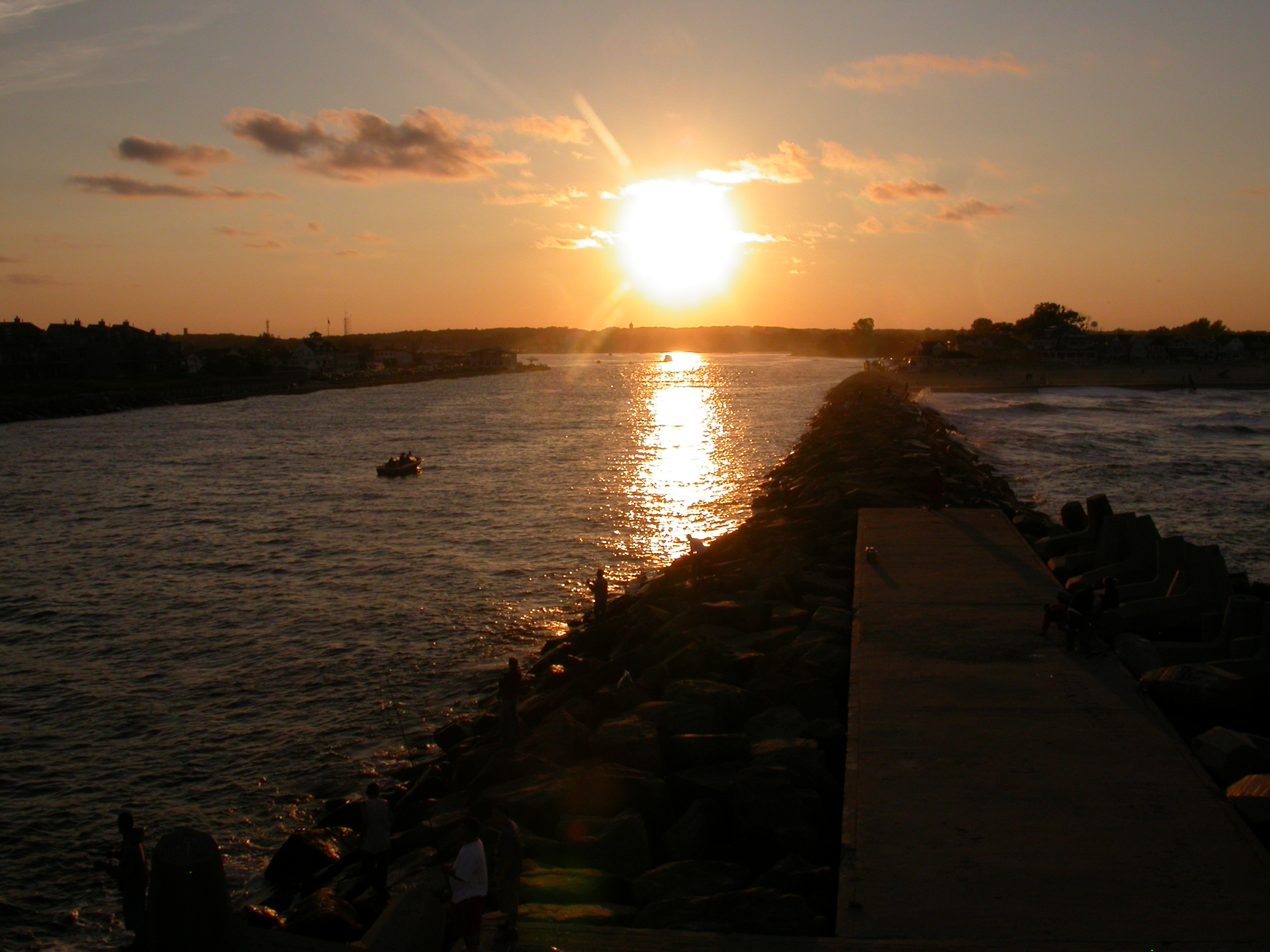
The Manasquan Inlet, looking west at sunset from the jetty in Manasquan

Manasquan (/ˌmænəˈskwɑːn/, man-ə-SKWAHN) is a borough in southern Monmouth County, in the U.S. state of New Jersey, on the Jersey Shore. As of the 2020 United States census, the borough's population was 5,938, an increase of 41 (+0.7%) from the 2010 census count of 5,897, which in turn reflected a decline of 413 (−6.5%) from the 6,310 counted in the 2000 census.

The borough's name is of Lenape Native American origin, deriving from "Mënàskunk" meaning "Place to Gather Grass or Reeds". The borough's name has also been described as deriving from "Man-A-Squaw-Han" meaning "stream of the island of squaws", "an island with enclosure for squans", "island door" or "point" / "top". Manasquan, Maniquan, Mannisquan, Manasquam, Squan, and Squan Village are variations on the original pronunciation and spelling.

Manasquan was formed as a borough by an act of the New Jersey Legislature on December 30, 1887, from portions of Wall Township, based on the results of a referendum held the previous day.

New Jersey Monthly magazine ranked Manasquan as its 22nd best place to live in its 2008 rankings of the "Best Places To Live" in New Jersey.

== Geography ==
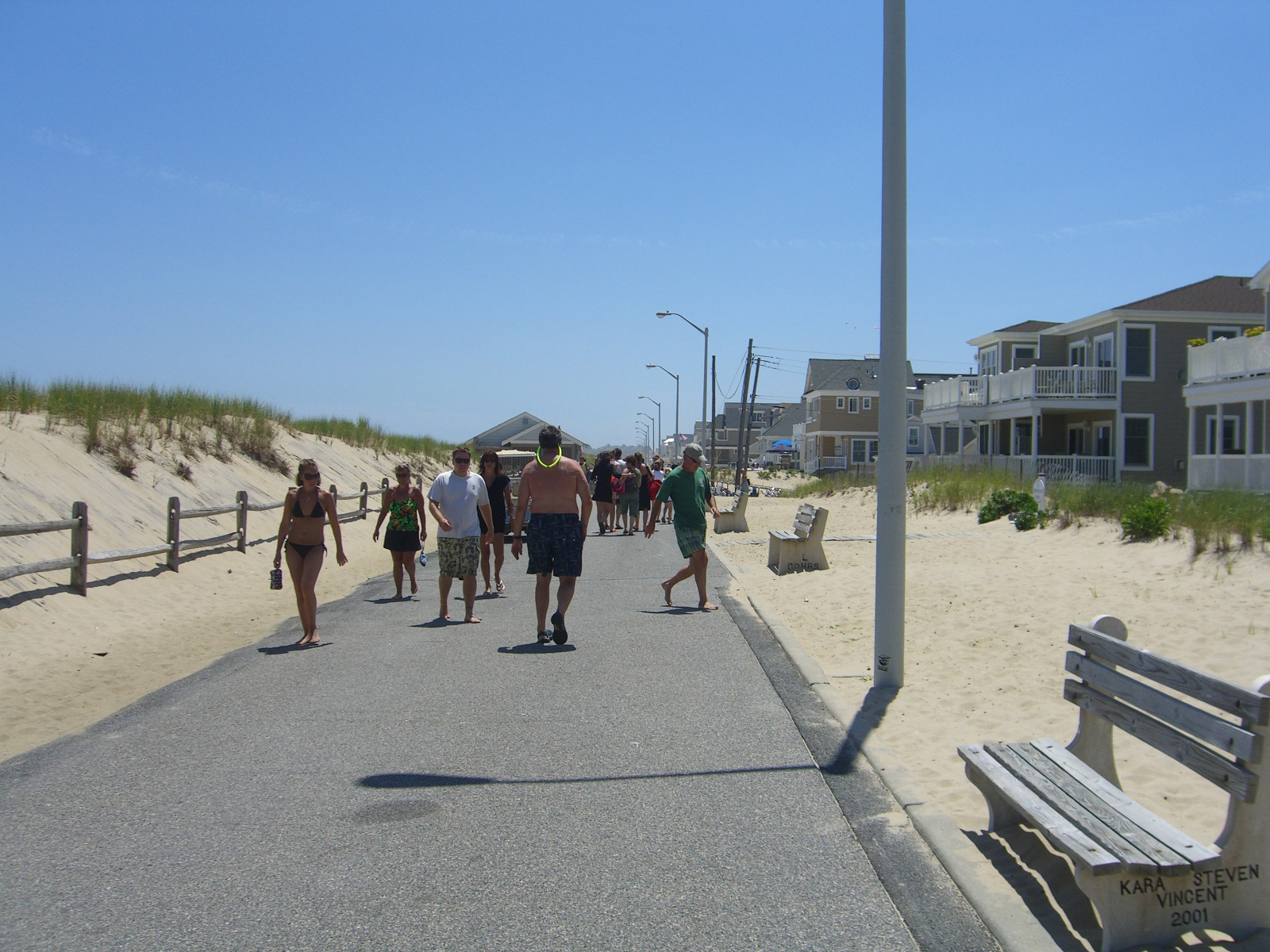
The boardwalk at Manasquan

According to the United States Census Bureau, the borough had a total area of 2.53 square miles (6.54 km^{2}), including 1.38 square miles (3.57 km^{2}) of land and 1.15 square miles (2.97 km^{2}) of water (45.26%).

The borough borders the municipalities of Brielle, Sea Girt and Wall Township in Monmouth County; and Point Pleasant Beach in northern Ocean County.

== Climate ==
According to the Köppen climate classification system, Manasquan has a humid subtropical climate (Cfa), and average monthly temperatures range from 32.3 °F (0.2 °C) in January to 75.2 °F (24.0 °C) in July.

Cfa climates in Manasquan are characterized by all months having an average mean temperature above 32.0 °F (0.0 °C), at least four months with an average mean temperature at or above 50.0 °F (10.0 °C), at least one month with an average mean temperature at or above 71.6 °F (22.0 °C) and no significant precipitation difference between seasons. During the summer months at Manasquan, a cooling afternoon sea breeze is present on most days, but episodes of extreme heat and humidity can occur with heat index values at or above 95.0 °F (35.0 °C). On average, the wettest month of the year is July, which corresponds with the annual peak in thunderstorm activity. During the winter months, episodes of extreme cold and wind can occur with wind chill values below 0.0 °F (−17.8 °C). The plant hardiness zone at Manasquan Beach is 7a with an average annual extreme minimum air temperature of 3.5 °F (−15.8 °C). The average seasonal (November–April) snowfall total is 18 to 24 inches (46 to 61 cm) and the average snowiest month is February which corresponds with the annual peak in nor'easter activity.

Climate data for Manasquan Beach, NJ (1981–2010 Averages)
Month	Jan	Feb	Mar	Apr	May	Jun	Jul	Aug	Sep	Oct	Nov	Dec	Year
Mean daily maximum °F (°C)	39.9 (4.4)	42.6 (5.9)	49.1 (9.5)	58.7 (14.8)	68.5 (20.3)	77.6 (25.3)	83.2 (28.4)	81.9 (27.7)	75.7 (24.3)	65.1 (18.4)	55.1 (12.8)	45.1 (7.3)	62.0 (16.7)
Daily mean °F (°C)	32.4 (0.2)	34.7 (1.5)	40.9 (4.9)	50.3 (10.2)	60.0 (15.6)	69.4 (20.8)	75.1 (23.9)	74.0 (23.3)	67.4 (19.7)	56.3 (13.5)	47.1 (8.4)	37.5 (3.1)	53.8 (12.1)
Mean daily minimum °F (°C)	24.9 (−3.9)	26.7 (−2.9)	32.7 (0.4)	41.9 (5.5)	51.5 (10.8)	61.2 (16.2)	67.0 (19.4)	66.0 (18.9)	59.0 (15.0)	47.3 (8.5)	39.0 (3.9)	30.0 (−1.1)	45.7 (7.6)
Average precipitation inches (mm)	3.66 (93)	3.12 (79)	4.19 (106)	4.00 (102)	3.45 (88)	3.65 (93)	4.72 (120)	4.44 (113)	3.44 (87)	3.74 (95)	4.05 (103)	4.04 (103)	46.50 (1,181)
Average relative humidity (%)	64.9	62.0	60.8	62.1	65.7	70.3	69.2	71.2	71.1	69.6	67.8	65.8	66.7
Average dew point °F (°C)	21.9 (−5.6)	23.0 (−5.0)	28.4 (−2.0)	37.8 (3.2)	48.5 (9.2)	59.3 (15.2)	64.3 (17.9)	64.1 (17.8)	57.7 (14.3)	46.5 (8.1)	37.0 (2.8)	27.1 (−2.7)	43.1 (6.2)
Source: PRISM

Climate data for Sandy Hook, NJ Ocean Water Temperature (25 N Manasquan)
Month	Jan	Feb	Mar	Apr	May	Jun	Jul	Aug	Sep	Oct	Nov	Dec	Year
Daily mean °F (°C)	37 (3)	36 (2)	40 (4)	46 (8)	55 (13)	62 (17)	69 (21)	72 (22)	68 (20)	59 (15)	51 (11)	43 (6)	53 (12)
Source: NOAA

=== Ecology ===
According to the A. W. Kuchler U.S. potential natural vegetation types, Manasquan would have an Appalachian Oak (104) vegetation type with an Eastern Hardwood Forest (25) vegetation form.

== Demographics ==
Historical population
Census	Pop.	Note	%±
1890	1,506		—
1900	1,500		−0.4%
1910	1,582		5.5%
1920	1,705		7.8%
1930	2,320		36.1%
1940	2,340		0.9%
1950	3,178		35.8%
1960	4,022		26.6%
1970	4,971		23.6%
1980	5,354		7.7%
1990	5,369		0.3%
2000	6,310		17.5%
2010	5,897		−6.5%
2020	5,938		0.7%
2023 (est.)	5,877	▼	−1.0%
Population sources: 1890–1920; 1890 1890–1910 1910–1930; 1940–2000 2000; 2010 2020

=== 2020 census ===
As of the 2020 census, Manasquan had a population of 5,938. The median age was 49.3 years. 18.1% of residents were under the age of 18 and 22.4% of residents were 65 years of age or older. For every 100 females there were 96.9 males, and for every 100 females age 18 and over there were 95.3 males age 18 and over.

100.0% of residents lived in urban areas, while 0.0% lived in rural areas.

There were 2,462 households in Manasquan, of which 24.4% had children under the age of 18 living in them. Of all households, 53.3% were married-couple households, 17.6% were households with a male householder and no spouse or partner present, and 24.8% were households with a female householder and no spouse or partner present. About 29.1% of all households were made up of individuals and 13.6% had someone living alone who was 65 years of age or older.

There were 3,412 housing units, of which 27.8% were vacant. The homeowner vacancy rate was 0.7% and the rental vacancy rate was 12.7%.

Racial composition as of the 2020 census
Race	Number	Percent
White	5,381	90.6%
Black or African American	18	0.3%
American Indian and Alaska Native	9	0.2%
Asian	50	0.8%
Native Hawaiian and Other Pacific Islander	5	0.1%
Some other race	212	3.6%
Two or more races	263	4.4%
Hispanic or Latino (of any race)	417	7.0%

=== 2010 census ===
The 2010 United States census counted 5,897 people, 2,374 households, and 1,550 families in the borough. The population density was 4,263.0 per square mile (1,646.0/km^{2}). There were 3,500 housing units at an average density of 2,530.2 per square mile (976.9/km^{2}). The racial makeup was 96.07% (5,665) White, 0.31% (18) Black or African American, 0.02% (1) Native American, 0.61% (36) Asian, 0.02% (1) Pacific Islander, 1.93% (114) from other races, and 1.05% (62) from two or more races. Hispanic or Latino of any race were 7.02% (414) of the population.

Of the 2,374 households, 27.3% had children under the age of 18; 52.5% were married couples living together; 9.1% had a female householder with no husband present and 34.7% were non-families. Of all households, 28.9% were made up of individuals and 10.7% had someone living alone who was 65 years of age or older. The average household size was 2.48 and the average family size was 3.10.

23.3% of the population were under the age of 18, 6.4% from 18 to 24, 22.6% from 25 to 44, 31.3% from 45 to 64, and 16.3% who were 65 years of age or older. The median age was 43.5 years. For every 100 females, the population had 95.3 males. For every 100 females ages 18 and older there were 91.4 males.

The Census Bureau's 2006–2010 American Community Survey showed that (in 2010 inflation-adjusted dollars) median household income was $87,525 (with a margin of error of +/− $21,227) and the median family income was $107,130 (+/− $13,653). Males had a median income of $98,408 (+/− $6,173) versus $56,250 (+/− $8,110) for females. The per capita income for the borough was $51,068 (+/− $8,350). About 3.1% of families and 5.0% of the population were below the poverty line, including 6.2% of those under age 18 and 4.7% of those age 65 or over.

=== 2000 census ===
As of the 2000 United States census there were 6,310 people, 2,600 households, and 1,635 families residing in the borough. The population density was 4,579.6 inhabitants per square mile (1,768.2/km^{2}). There were 3,531 housing units at an average density of 2,562.7 per square mile (989.5/km^{2}). The racial makeup of the borough was 97.89% White, 0.41% Black, 0.11% Native American, 0.44% Asian, 0.48% from other races, and 0.67% from two or more races. Hispanic or Latino of any race were 4.48% of the population.

There were 2,600 households, out of which 29.5% had children under the age of 18 living with them, 49.3% were married couples living together, 10.3% had a female householder with no husband present, and 37.1% were non-families. 30.2% of all households were made up of individuals, and 11.5% had someone living alone who was 65 years of age or older. The average household size was 2.43 and the average family size was 3.06.

In the borough the population was spread out, with 23.8% under the age of 18, 6.6% from 18 to 24, 29.6% from 25 to 44, 25.1% from 45 to 64, and 14.9% who were 65 years of age or older. The median age was 39 years. For every 100 females, there were 96.9 males. For every 100 females age 18 and over, there were 95.4 males.

The median income for a household in the borough was $63,079, and the median income for a family was $73,670. Males had a median income of $52,368 versus $33,333 for females. The per capita income for the borough was $32,898. About 2.2% of families and 3.1% of the population were below the poverty line, including 2.8% of those under age 18 and 5.3% of those age 65 or over.

== Government ==
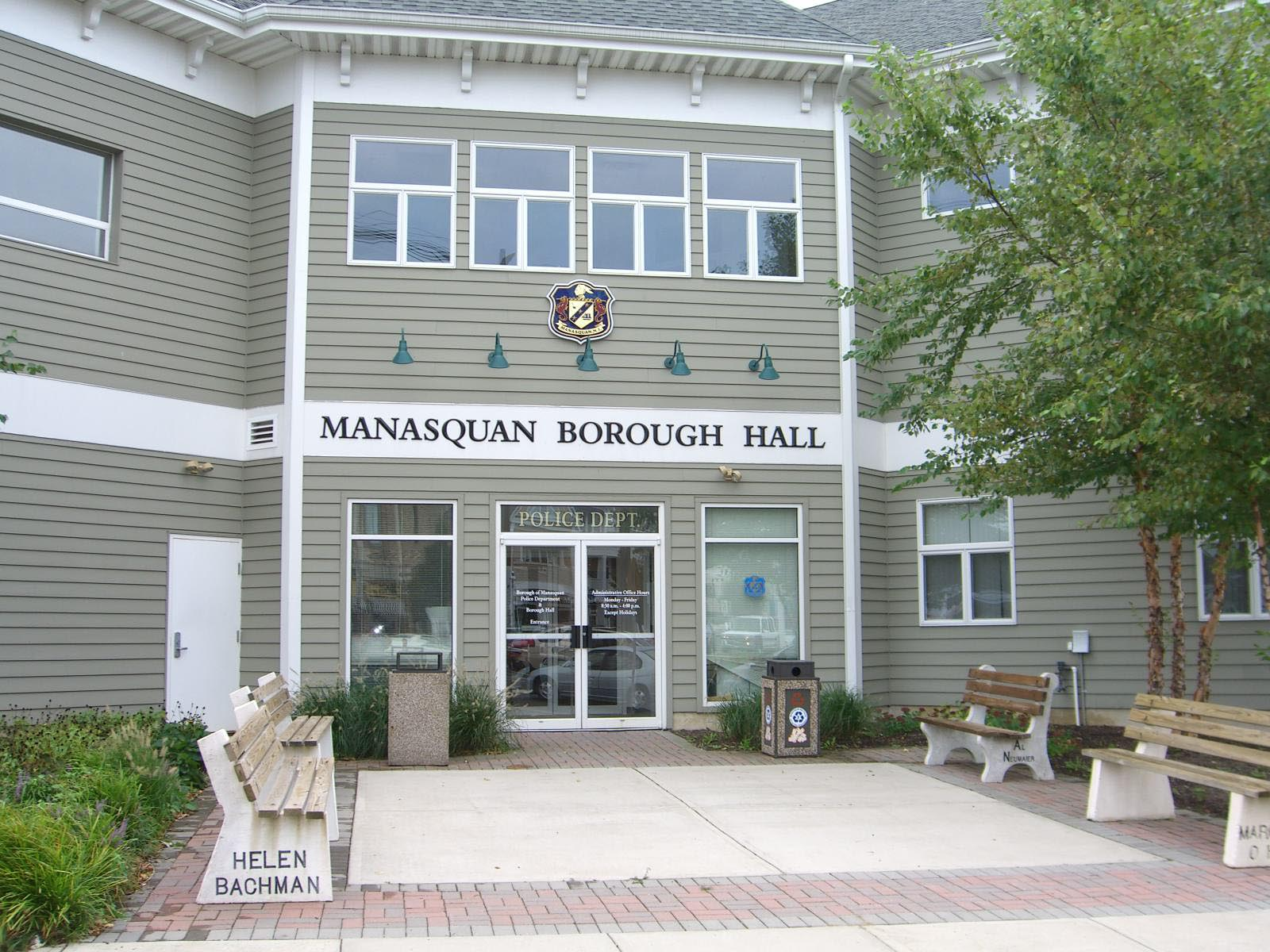
Manasquan Borough Hall, at the intersection of Main Street and Union Avenue

=== Local ===
Manasquan is governed under the borough form of New Jersey municipal government, which is used in 218 municipalities (of the 564) statewide, making it the most common form of government in New Jersey. The governing body is comprised of a mayor and a borough council, with all positions elected at-large on a partisan basis as part of the November general election. A mayor is elected directly by the voters to a four-year term of office. The borough council consists of six members elected to serve three-year terms on a staggered basis, with two seats coming up for election each year in a three-year cycle. The borough form of government used by Manasquan is a "weak mayor / strong council" government in which council members act as the legislative body with the mayor presiding at meetings and voting only in the event of a tie. The mayor can veto ordinances subject to an override by a two-thirds majority vote of the council. The mayor makes committee and liaison assignments for council members, and most appointments are made by the mayor with the advice and consent of the council.

As of 2025, the mayor of the Borough of Manasquan is Democrat Michael W. Mangan, whose term of office ends December 31, 2027. Members of the Borough Council are Bruce D. Bresnahan (R, 2025), Jason A. "Jay" Bryant (D, 2026), Brian G. Holly (R, 2027), Gregg Olivera (R, 2025), Lori A. Triggiano (R, 2027) and Sheila Vidreiro (D, 2026).

At the January 2017 reorganization meeting, Joseph Bossone was chosen on an interim basis to fill the three-year seat expiring in December 2019 that Owen McCarthy had been elected to in November 2016 until he resigned from office after being confirmed by the state senate to take a position as a Monmouth County judge; Bossone served on an interim basis until the November 2017 general election, when he was elected to serve the balance of the term of office.

In January 2016, the borough council appointed Richard Read to fill the council seat expiring in December 2016 that became vacant when Edward Donovan was sworn in as mayor.

=== Federal, state, and county representation ===
Manasquan is located in the 4th Congressional District and is part of New Jersey's 10th state legislative district.

For the 119th United States Congress, New Jersey's 4th congressional district is represented by Chris Smith (R, Manchester Township). New Jersey is represented in the United States Senate by Democrats Cory Booker (Newark, term ends 2027) and Andy Kim (Moorestown, term ends 2031).

For the 2026–2027 session, the 10th legislative district of the New Jersey Legislature is represented in the State Senate by James W. Holzapfel (R, Toms River) and in the General Assembly by Paul Kanitra (R, Point Pleasant Beach) and Gregory P. McGuckin (R, Toms River).

Monmouth County is governed by a Board of County Commissioners composed of five members who are elected at-large to serve three-year terms of office on a staggered basis, with either one or two seats up for election each year as part of the November general election. At an annual reorganization meeting held in the beginning of January, the board selects one of its members to serve as director and another as deputy director.

As of 2026, Monmouth County's Commissioners are Director Thomas A. Arnone (R, Neptune City, 2028),Deputy Director Nick DiRocco (R, Wall Township, 2028), Susan M. Kiley (R, Hazlet Township, 2027), Erik Anderson (R, Shrewsbury, 2026), and Ross F. Licitra (R, Marlboro Township, 2026).

Constitutional officers elected on a countywide basis are Clerk Christine Giordano Hanlon (R, 2030; Ocean Township), Sheriff Shaun Golden (R, 2028; Howell Township) and Surrogate Maureen Raisch (R, 2026; Middletown Township).

=== Politics ===
United States presidential election results for Manasquan
Year	Republican		Democratic		Third party(ies)	
Year	No.	%	No.	%	No.	%
2024	2,245	56.28%	1,681	42.14%	63	1.58%
2020	2,248	53.55%	1,874	44.64%	76	1.81%
2016	2,004	57.70%	1,344	38.70%	125	3.60%
2012	1,826	59.69%	1,201	39.26%	32	1.05%
2008	1,943	57.45%	1,406	41.57%	33	0.98%
2004	2,136	62.47%	1,237	36.18%	46	1.35%
2000	1,729	55.68%	1,185	38.16%	191	6.15%
1996	1,318	49.83%	1,017	38.45%	310	11.72%
1992	1,505	50.76%	817	27.55%	643	21.69%

As of March 2011, there were a total of 4,277 registered voters in Manasquan, of which 956 (22.4%) were registered as Democrats, 1,271 (29.7%) were registered as Republicans and 2,047 (47.9%) were registered as Unaffiliated. There were three voters registered as Libertarians or Greens.

In the 2012 presidential election, Republican Mitt Romney received 59.7% of the vote (1,826 cast), ahead of Democrat Barack Obama with 39.3% (1,201 votes), and other candidates with 1.0% (32 votes), among the 3,080 ballots cast by the borough's 4,350 registered voters (21 ballots were spoiled), for a turnout of 70.8%. In the 2008 presidential election, Republican John McCain received 56.8% of the vote (1,943 cast), ahead of Democrat Barack Obama with 41.1% (1,406 votes) and other candidates with 1.0% (33 votes), among the 3,420 ballots cast by the borough's 4,384 registered voters, for a turnout of 78.0%. In the 2004 presidential election, Republican George W. Bush received 62.2% of the vote (2,136 ballots cast), outpolling Democrat John Kerry with 36.0% (1,237 votes) and other candidates with 1.0% (46 votes), among the 3,434 ballots cast by the borough's 4,452 registered voters, for a turnout percentage of 77.1.

Gubernatorial election results for Manasquan
Year	Republican		Democratic		Third party(ies)	
Year	No.	%	No.	%	No.	%
2025	1,949	57.11%	1,454	42.60%	10	0.29%
2021	1,884	62.34%	1,111	36.76%	27	0.89%
2017	1,368	61.40%	814	36.54%	46	2.06%
2013	1,872	76.19%	549	22.34%	36	1.47%
2009	1,695	66.03%	674	26.26%	198	7.71%
2005	1,480	58.66%	942	37.34%	101	4.00%

In the 2013 gubernatorial election, Republican Chris Christie received 76.2% of the vote (1,872 cast), ahead of Democrat Barbara Buono with 22.3% (549 votes), and other candidates with 1.5% (36 votes), among the 2,504 ballots cast by the borough's 4,378 registered voters (47 ballots were spoiled), for a turnout of 57.2%. In the 2009 gubernatorial election, Republican Chris Christie received 65.6% of the vote (1,695 ballots cast), ahead of Democrat Jon Corzine with 26.1% (674 votes), Independent Chris Daggett with 6.8% (175 votes) and other candidates with 0.9% (23 votes), among the 2,584 ballots cast by the borough's 4,269 registered voters, yielding a 60.5% turnout.

United States Senate election results for Manasquan1
Year	Republican		Democratic		Third party(ies)	
Year	No.	%	No.	%	No.	%
2024	2,239	57.59%	1,598	41.10%	51	1.31%
2018	1,803	59.19%	1,118	36.70%	125	4.10%
2012	1,762	60.78%	1,105	38.12%	32	1.10%
2006	1,401	61.29%	819	35.83%	66	2.89%

United States Senate election results for Manasquan2
Year	Republican		Democratic		Third party(ies)	
Year	No.	%	No.	%	No.	%
2020	2,326	56.33%	1,718	41.61%	85	2.06%
2014	1,197	58.59%	786	38.47%	60	2.94%
2013	873	63.26%	497	36.01%	10	0.72%
2008	1,939	61.83%	1,150	36.67%	47	1.50%

== Community ==
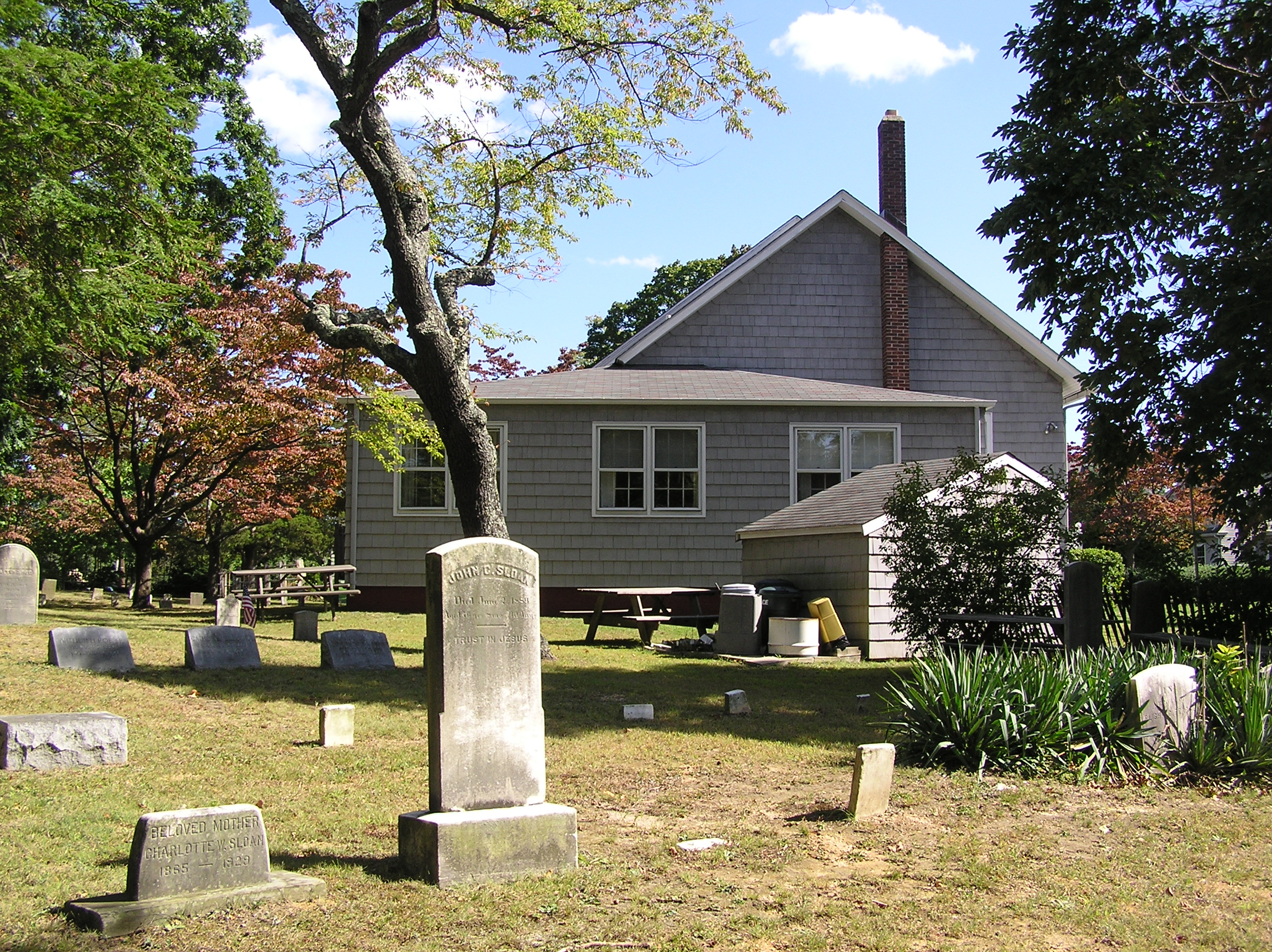
Manasquan Friends Meetinghouse

Due to its location bordering the Atlantic Ocean, the population of Manasquan increases dramatically in the summer months as tourists flock to the beach.

The Manasquan Inlet provides surfers with waves that are corralled, refracted and enlarged by the jetty protruding out into the Atlantic Ocean. The Manasquan Inlet, reopened in 1931, is the northern terminus of the inland portion of the Intracoastal Waterway.

Manasquan has a downtown area with many small businesses. Algonquin Arts Theatre has shows and movies that play throughout the year. It is a historic 540-seat theatre, built in 1938 as a movie house but converted to a professional live performance space in May 1994.

The demolition of traditional beach bungalows and their replacement with much larger single-family dwellings has helped turn Manasquan into a year-round community. The decrease in tourism and rise in residency can be attributed to the decline of once popular tourist destinations. Manasquan no longer has a 24-hour diner or a miniature golf course, and has lost many of the bars once located in its borders. During the summer months, the local bar and party scene overwhelm the area between Brielle Road and Main Street from the bridges to the ocean.

The Firemans' Fair occurs every July/August. The fair is the largest source of funds for Manasquan Volunteer Engine Company #2 and dates back to 1974. Though it was on a decade-long hiatus until the late 1990s, the five day-long festivities in 2011 were expected to draw 30,000 attendees.

Until 2010, Manasquan was home to the Cat Fanciers' Association (CFA), the largest registry of pedigreed cats in the world.

== Transportation ==
=== Roads and highways ===
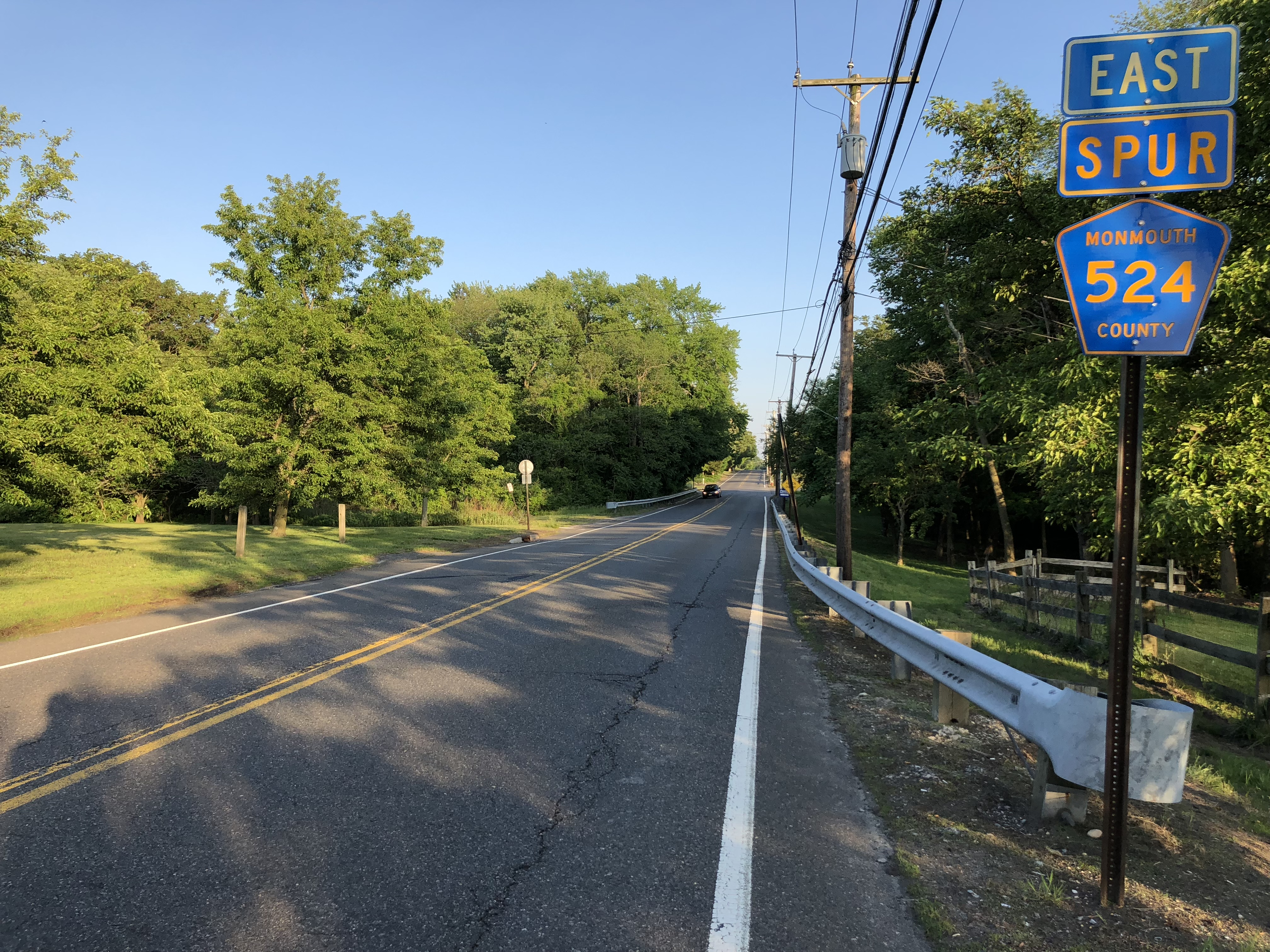
Monmouth County Route 524 spur looking eastward, in Manasquan

As of May 2010, the borough had a total of 27.22 miles (43.81 km) of roadways, of which 24.56 miles (39.53 km) were maintained by the municipality, 1.56 miles (2.51 km) by Monmouth County and 1.10 miles (1.77 km) by the New Jersey Department of Transportation.

Route 71 is the most significant highway running directly through the borough. The Garden State Parkway is the nearest major highway. County Route 524 Spur is also an important thoroughfare in Manasquan.

=== Public transportation ===
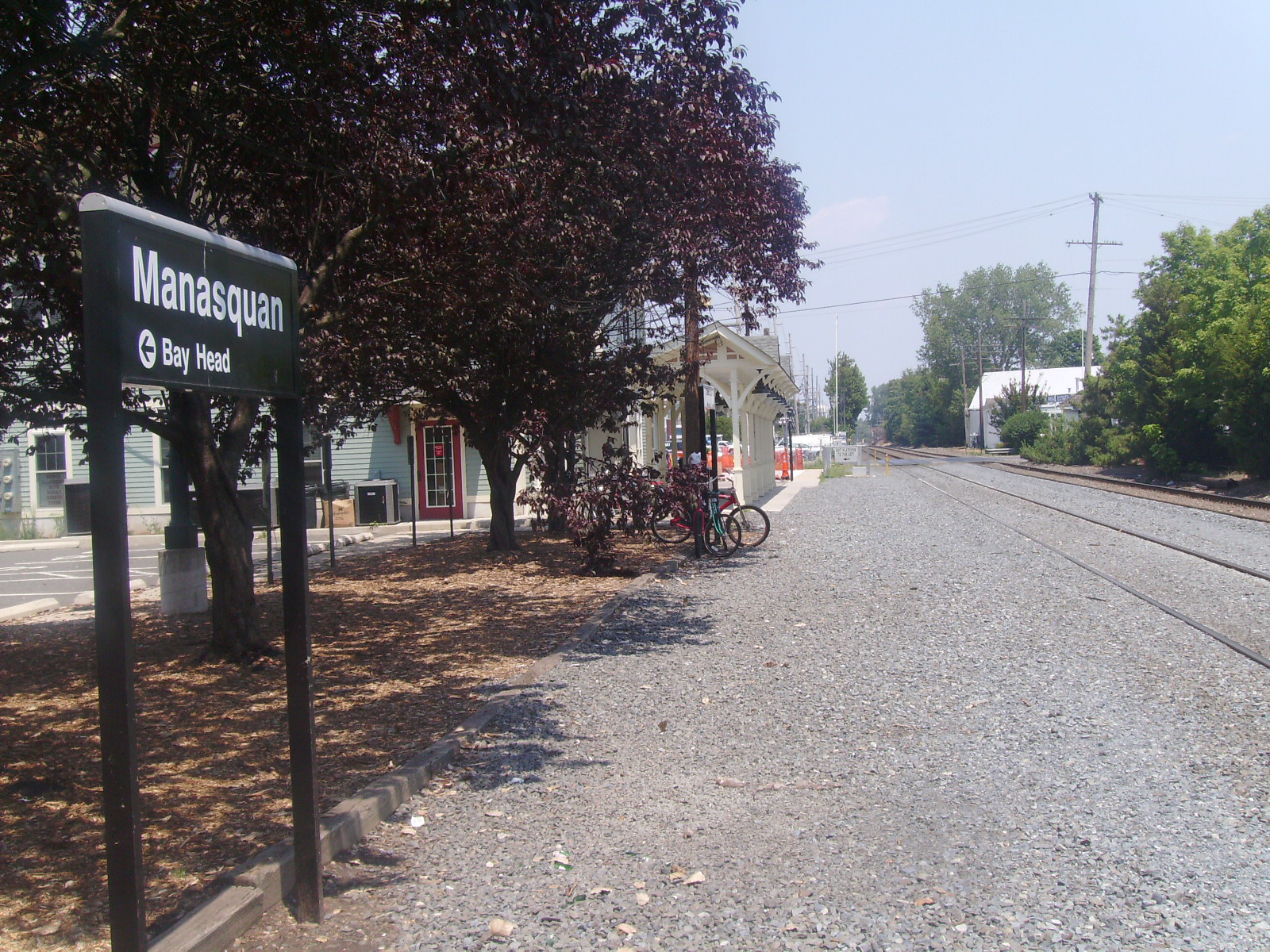
Manasquan station, which is served by NJ Transit's North Jersey Coast Line

NJ Transit offers rail service at the Manasquan station. Commuter service is available on the North Jersey Coast Line south to Point Pleasant Beach and Bay Head or north to points such as Belmar, Long Branch, Newark, Hoboken Terminal and Penn Station in Midtown Manhattan.

NJ Transit provides bus transportation between Manasquan and Philadelphia on the 317 route and local service on the 830 route.

== Education ==
The Manasquan Public Schools serves students from kindergarten through twelfth grade. As of the 2022–23 school year, the district, comprised of two schools, had an enrollment of 1,470 students and 146.4 classroom teachers (on an FTE basis), for a student–teacher ratio of 10.0:1. Schools in the district (with 2022–23 enrollment data from the National Center for Education Statistics) are Manasquan Elementary School with 499 students in grades K-8 and Manasquan High School with 948 students in grades 9-12. In addition to students from Manasquan, the district's high school also serves public school students from Avon-by-the-Sea, Belmar, Brielle, Lake Como, Sea Girt, Spring Lake, and Spring Lake Heights, who attend Manasquan High School as part of sending/receiving relationships with their respective districts. The two Manasquan public school buildings are across from each other on Broad Street, with board of education offices next door to the high school.

The Roman Catholic-affiliated St. Denis School served youth from pre-school through 8th grade under the auspices of the Roman Catholic Diocese of Trenton. In 2014, the diocese announced that the school was closing at the end of the 2014–2015 school year, as fewer students were attending, with enrollment having fallen from a peak of nearly 400 in the 1970s to 107 in 2014.

== Notable people ==
People who were born in, residents of, or otherwise closely associated with Manasquan include:

- Lewis Benson (1906–1986), expert on the writings of George Fox
- Matthew Bouraee (born 1988), soccer player who played for West Adelaide SC in the National Premier Leagues
- Doris Burke (born 1965), ESPN basketball analyst
- Frank J. Dodd (1938–2010), businessman and politician who served as President of the New Jersey Senate from 1974 to 1975
- Ryan Flores (born 1987), professional stock car racing driver and crew member who competes in the SMART Modified Tour
- Glenn Hedden (born 1950), former head football coach and athletic director at Kean University
- Alexis Krauss (born 1985), singer, songwriter, and front-woman of the noise pop duo Sleigh Bells
- Jack Nicholson (born 1937), actor, director and writer
- Beth Peters (1932–2024), actress who appeared on General Hospital
- Shayne Pospisil (born 1985), snowboarder
- Christie Rampone (born 1975), captain of the United States women's national soccer team
- Kieran Shea (born 1965), science fiction writer
- Alex Skuby (born 1972), actor best known for appearing on King of Queens
- Joseph Steinberg (1883–1932), lawyer and politician who served in the New York State Assembly
- Hal Thompson (1922–2006), football player who played for two seasons in the NFL for the Brooklyn Dodgers

Preceded by Sea Girt	Beaches of New Jersey	Succeeded by Point Pleasant Beach
