= Tom Fenton =

American television correspondent (1930–2024)

- Born: Thomas Trail Fenton; April 8, 1930; Baltimore, Maryland, U.S.
- Died: July 16, 2024 (aged 94); Novato, California, U.S.
- Occupation: Television correspondent

Thomas Trail Fenton (April 8, 1930 – July 16, 2024) was a television correspondent with CBS News from 1970 until his retirement in 2004.

== Early life and education ==
Fenton graduated from Dartmouth College in 1952 with a B.A. in English and was an officer in the United States Navy from 1952 to 1961, serving on destroyers in the Atlantic and Mediterranean. His Navy service placed him in Guantanamo Bay, Cuba in 1952, and in the Mediterranean Sea during the 1958 Lebanon Crisis.

== Career in journalism ==
After leaving the navy, Fenton began his career in journalism as a domestic and foreign correspondent for the Baltimore Sun, where he worked from 1961 to 1969. While with the Sun, he reported on affairs in the Middle East and Europe, including the 1967 Six-Day War and the 1968 "Days of May" in Paris. His 1968 reporting earned Fenton an award from the Overseas Press Club.

Fenton joined CBS News as a Rome-based correspondent in 1970, and conducted the first interview with hostages taken that year by the Palestine Liberation Organization. He later reported on the Indo-Pakistani War of 1971, the 1973 Yom Kippur War, and the 1974 Turkish invasion of Cyprus. When Ayatollah Khomeini overthrew the Shah of Iran in 1979, Fenton was the first western journalist to interview Iran's new leader. He later returned to Tehran to report on the Iran hostage crisis.

In 1991, Fenton was in Israel during the first Gulf War to report on the effects of Scud missile attacks from Iraq. Later that year, he was in Moscow to cover the fall of the Soviet Union. During the 1990s, Fenton reported on the wars in the Balkans, and violence in the Middle East and Africa.

During his CBS career, Fenton served as the network's Bureau Chief in Rome, Italy (1970–1973), Tel Aviv, Israel (1973–1977), Paris, France (1977–1979), London, United Kingdom (1979–1994), Moscow, Russia (1994–1996), and London again (1996–2004).

== Later life and death ==
Fenton retired in 2004. Afterwards, Fenton wrote the book, Bad News: The Decline of Reporting, the Business of News, and the Danger to Us All, published in 2005, (ISBN 0-06-079746-0).

Fenton died in Novato, California, on July 16, 2024, at the age of 94.
