= John Lomax (reporter) =

American news anchor (1951–2024)

- Born: John R. Lomax; May 16, 1951; Knoxville, Tennessee, U.S.
- Died: March 12, 2024 (aged 72); Villa Hills, Kentucky, U.S.
- Education: University of Tennessee
- Occupations: News anchor, reporter
- Years active: 1983–2022
- Spouse: Donna Lomax
- Children: 2

John R. Lomax (May 16, 1951 – March 12, 2024) was an American news anchor and reporter.

== Early life and early career ==
John Lomax was born the oldest of seven children on May 16, 1951, in Knoxville, Tennessee. He graduated from the University of Tennessee in 1977, majoring in communications and psychology. Lomax moved to Fort Lauderdale, Florida, and worked as a savings and loan office branch manager for four years before returning to television.

== Television career ==
Lomax started working at Local 12 as a reporter in 1983 and became a morning show anchor in 1990. Lomax co-anchored Good Morning Cincinnati for 32 years. He retired in April 2022. He was succeeded by Aleah Hordges in May 2022 as the co-anchor of Good Morning Cincinnati. Lomax was in the Cincinnati Society of Professional Journalists Hall of Fame and was a member of Omega Psi Phi. His retirement date of April 29, 2022, was reportedly proclaimed "John Lomax Day" in Hamilton County, Ohio.

== Personal life and death ==
Lomax was the first African-American male news anchor at WKRC. He was diagnosed with type 2 diabetes in February 2007. He was married to Donna and had two children, along with grandchildren. He died on March 12, 2024, at age 72. Lomax resided in Villa Hills, Kentucky, and he had been diagnosed with pneumonia, being admitted to the hospital afterwards.
