= Carousel Theater =

Coordinates: 42.31692°N 71.39494°W

- Interactive map of Carousel Theater
- Address: Framingham, Massachusetts
- Capacity: 2,500-3,000
- Type: theatre in the round

Construction
- Opened: 30 June 1958
- Closed: early 1970s

The Carousel Theater was a theatre in the round located in Framingham, Massachusetts, on the Old Connecticut Path. The Carousel Theater was opened in 1958. It had a capacity of approximately 2,500-3,000 people.

The venue held weekly dinner theater musicals for many years. The first ever performance at the Theater was the musical New Girl in Town on June 30, 1958. Among the many performers who appeared in musicals at the Carousel were: Ethel Merman, Anthony Perkins and Ginger Rogers.

The theatre also hosted performances by a number of famous rock bands and musicians in the 1960s and 1970s, including Ella Fitzgerald (1963) and Jimi Hendrix (1968) & Led Zeppelin and Frank Zappa (1969).

The Carousel Theater was closed in the early 1970s and has been replaced by "Carousel Office Park", which consists of several office buildings.
