= Ruth Ashton Taylor =

American television journalist (1922–2024)

- Born: Ruth Arlene Montoya; April 20, 1922; Long Beach, California, U.S.
- Died: January 11, 2024 (aged 101); San Rafael, California, U.S.
- Education: Columbia University
- Occupation: Television journalist
- Spouse(s): Edwin Wright Conklin (m. 1949-1960; divorced); Jack Elmer Taylor (m. 1968)
- Children: 2

Ruth Ashton Taylor (April 20, 1922 – January 11, 2024) was an American television and radio newscaster, with a career in broadcasting that spanned over 50 years. She was the first female newscaster on television in Los Angeles and the West Coast. She received many awards and honors, including a Lifetime Achievement Emmy Award and a star on the Hollywood Walk of Fame.

== Early life and education ==
Ruth Arlene Montoya was born on April 20, 1922 in Long Beach, California. Her mother, Flora Ashton, opened Sis Ashton's Cafe in Signal Hill, California, after her husband, Ruth's father, Julian Montoya, abandoned the family in 1926. Young Ruth soon took the Ashton surname as her own. She graduated in 1939 from Long Beach Polytechnic High School and completed her undergraduate degree at Scripps College. She relocated to New York City thereafter, receiving a master's degree in journalism from Columbia University in 1944.

== Career ==
Following her graduation, she took a job as a news writer at CBS radio, taking a place among the original members of the documentary unit of Edward R. Murrow.

When she first began as a writer and producer there, she had no thoughts of going on air as, to her knowledge, it simply wasn't done in major news markets. According to Ashton, CBS management didn't want to broadcast women because they "just didn't like those squeaky voices". However, by 1949, she was on the air, interviewing such notable individuals as Albert Einstein. Eventually, she was transferred to a religious program, and, disappointed by her exclusion from news broadcasting, she left CBS radio in New York and returned to Los Angeles.

In 1951, she became the first woman on television news on the West Coast of the United States when she took a job with Los Angeles' KNXT-TV (now KCBS). Although originally hired to cover the "Women's Angle", she indicated in interviews that the lack of conventional roles for women in broadcasting had given her considerable freedom in the stories she selected to cover.

In 1958, she left briefly to work as a public information officer at a college before returning in 1962. She officially retired in 1989, but continued occasionally contributing into her 70s. As a news reporter and program host, she became an influential figure on subsequent female journalists, with numerous industry awards and a career that included notable interviews with such diverse people as Jimmy Carter and Jimmy Durante.

== Later life and death ==
Ashton Taylor turned 100 on April 20, 2022, and died in San Rafael, California, on January 11, 2024, at the age of 101. Survivors included her two daughters from her first marriage; her stepson; her grandson and granddaughter-in-law; and her great-grandson.

== Honors and awards ==
During her time in broadcasting, Ashton Taylor became a widely known and celebrated figure. In 1983, The Los Angeles Times indicated that she had a reputation as "one of the best newspeople in television". A 2007 article in the Journal of Broadcasting & Electronic Media described her as "one of the most recognizable people on radio and television in Los Angeles".

Ashton Taylor received a Star in the Hollywood Walk of Fame in 1990.

Other notable honors include a Governors Award for Lifetime Achievement bestowed by the Academy of Television Arts and Sciences and a Diamond Achievement Award from Women in Communications (1984).
