= Boku (juice) =

Fruit juice brand

BoKu
- Product type: Fruit juice brand
- Current owner: McCain Citrus, Inc.
- Country: United States
- Introduced: 1990
- Discontinued: 2003
- Tagline: "Adult juice"

BoKu was a fruit juice brand marketed in the United States from 1990 to 2003 by McCain Citrus, Inc. It was sold in a box, much like competitors such as Minute Maid.

BoKu was marketed as "adult" juice, as juice boxes were commonly attributed to grade-school children because of their small size and easy ability to pack in a lunch. Consequently, BoKu juice boxes were larger, omitted a straw in favor of a pull tab, and were offered in flavors considered more suitable for adults.

BoKu is a play on the French word beaucoup, meaning "a lot", due to BoKu containing more juice.

BoKu's television ads featured comedian Richard Lewis. Lewis would be seen standing in front of the camera, holding a BoKu box and espousing how the product was suited more for adults than children. At the end of each ad, shortly after taking a sip, Lewis would say to the camera: "Is that too much to ask?!"

== Popular culture ==
BoKu beverages appear in the Disney+ series Loki.
