= John C. Hartigan =

American visual effects artist and special effects coordinator (1957–2024)

- Born: John Christopher Hartigan; June 1, 1957; Pittsfield, Massachusetts
- Died: November 7, 2024 (aged 67); Canyon Country, Santa Clarita, California
- Occupation(s): Visual effects artist, special effects coordinator
- Spouse: Beverly Hartigan
- Children: Hailey Hartigan, Shayne Hartigan

John Christopher Hartigan (June 1, 1957 – November 7, 2024) was an American visual effects artist and special effects coordinator known for his work on Kill Bill, Hawaii Five-0, and Lilo & Stitch.

In 2014, Hartigan was nominated for a Primetime Emmy Award in the category Outstanding Special And Visual Effects In A Supporting Role for his work on the television program Hawaii Five-0. His nomination was shared with Armen V. Kevorkian, Alexander G. Soltes, Jane Sharvina, Rick Ramirez, Dan Lopez, Steve Graves, Andranik Taranyan and Chad Schott.

Hartigan died in Canyon Country, Santa Clarita, California on November 7, 2024, at the age of 67.
