= Neal Sterling =

American football player (born 1992)

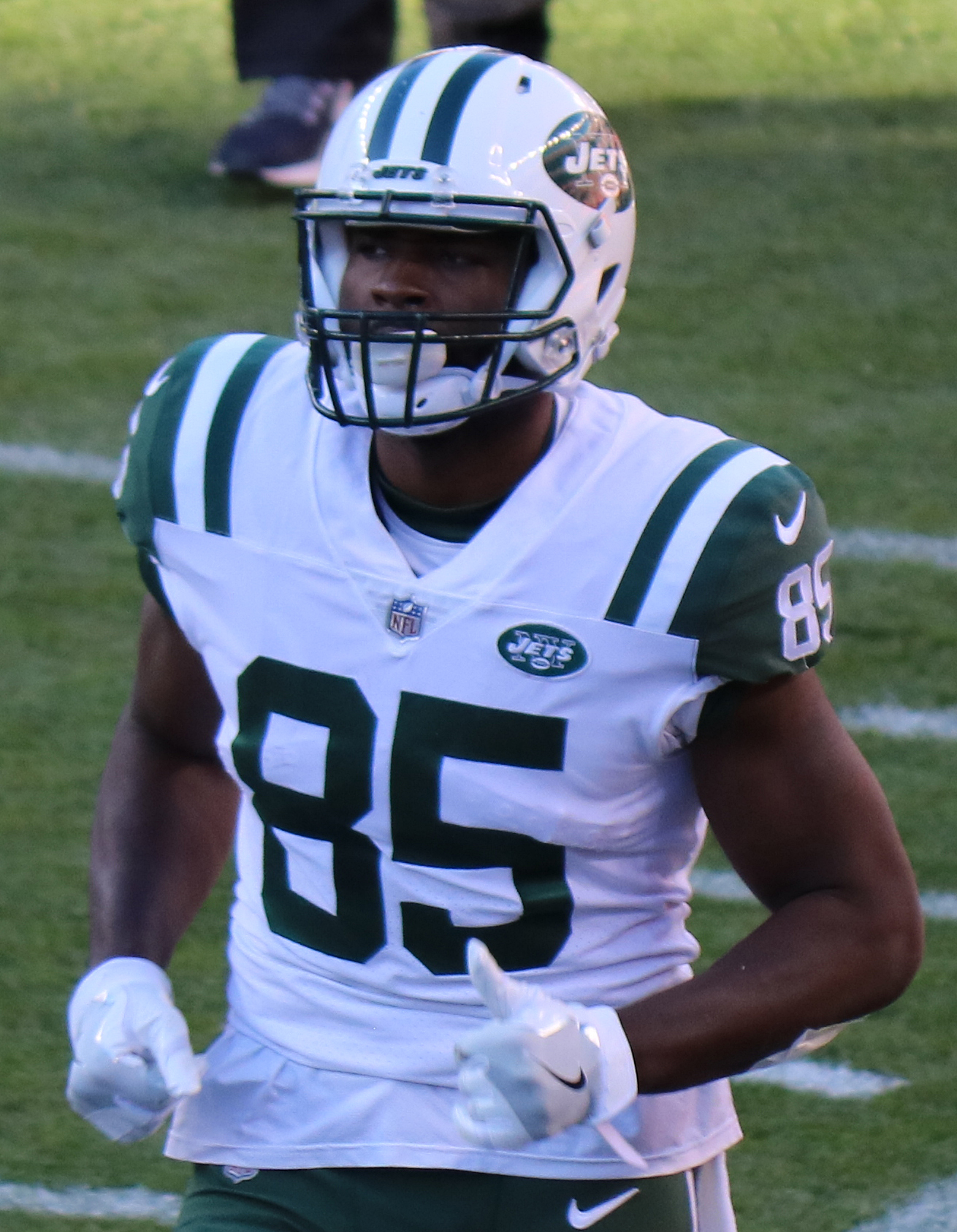
- Sterling with the New York Jets in 2017

No. 85, 87
- Position: Tight end

Personal information
- Born: January 14, 1992 (age 34); Belmar, New Jersey, U.S.
- Listed height: 6 ft 4 in (1.93 m)
- Listed weight: 257 lb (117 kg)

Career information
- High school: Manasquan (Manasquan, New Jersey)
- College: Monmouth (2010–2014)
- NFL draft: 2015: 7th round, 220th overall pick

Career history
- Jacksonville Jaguars (2015–2016); New York Jets (2017); Kansas City Chiefs (2017)*; New York Jets (2017–2018); Kansas City Chiefs (2019)*
- * Offseason or practice squad member only

Awards and highlights
- First-team All-Big South (2014)

Career NFL statistics
- Receptions: 24
- Receiving yards: 239
- Stats at Pro Football Reference

Neal J. Sterling (born January 14, 1992) is an American former professional football tight end who played in the National Football League (NFL) for four seasons. He played college football for the Monmouth Hawks, earning first-team All-Big South honors in 2014. Sterling was selected in the seventh round of the 2015 NFL draft by the Jacksonville Jaguars, where he spent his first two seasons. In his last two seasons, he was a member of the New York Jets.

== Early life ==
Sterling attended Belmar Elementary School (Belmar, New Jersey) and Manasquan High School (in Manasquan, New Jersey), where he played both basketball and football. Sterling was a two-time NJSIAA Group II Central Jersey State Champion his junior and senior year at Manasquan High School under coach Pete Cahill. In his senior year, the Warriors posted a 9–3 record where Sterling led the team in offense with 40 catches for 700 yards with 8 touchdowns. He also contributed on defense at safety, where he recorded 50 tackles and one interception. After receiving multiple scholarships for both sports, he opted for a full football scholarship offer from Monmouth University in West Long Branch, New Jersey.

== College career ==
Sterling played wide receiver for the Hawks. He did not see time his freshman year, ultimately redshirting. In his redshirt freshman year, Sterling started all 11 of Monmouth's games where he recorded 57 receptions for 677 yards and five touchdowns. After leading the team in receptions and receiving yards, Sterling was named Northeast Conference Offensive Rookie of the Year and was a finalist for the Jerry Rice Award, given to the nation's top freshman in the Football Championship Subdivision (FCS). During his sophomore campaign, Sterling recorded 33 receptions, 386 receiving yards, and five touchdowns while playing in all 10 games. His 33 catches were third on the team and the 386 receiving yards were second. In his junior year, Sterling played in all 12 of his games where he recorded 57 catches, 647 receiving yards, and six touchdowns which all led the team. The following year, Sterling had his best season. He again led the team in the three major receiving categories where he got 55 receptions, 905 receiving yards, and six touchdowns.

== Professional career ==
=== Jacksonville Jaguars ===
Sterling was selected by the Jacksonville Jaguars in the seventh round with the 220th overall pick of the 2015 NFL draft. He was waived by the team on September 4, 2015 and was signed to the practice squad. He was promoted to the active roster on October 20, 2015.

In 2016, Sterling converted to the tight end position. He played in 10 games with one start during the 2016 season, recording 12 catches for 110 yards.

On September 3, 2017, Sterling was waived by the Jaguars.

=== New York Jets (first stint) ===
On September 6, 2017, Sterling was signed by the New York Jets. He was released by the team on October 5, 2017.

=== Kansas City Chiefs (first stint) ===
On October 7, 2017, Sterling was signed to the Kansas City Chiefs' practice squad.

=== New York Jets (second stint) ===
On October 25, 2017, Sterling was signed by the Jets off the Chiefs' practice squad.

On November 10, 2018, Sterling was placed on injured reserve with a head injury.

On March 25, 2019, Sterling re-signed with the Jets. He was released on June 11, 2019.

=== Kansas City Chiefs (second stint) ===
On June 13, 2019, Sterling signed with the Chiefs. He was released on July 24.
