= James Gallagher (soccer) =

American soccer player

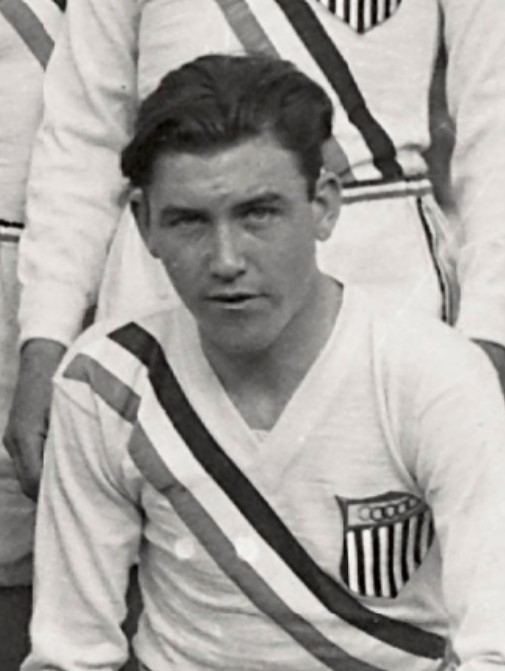
- Gallagher in 1928

Personal information
- Full name: James Aloysius Gallagher
- Date of birth: June 8, 1909
- Place of birth: East Newark, New Jersey, U.S.
- Date of death: April 16, 1992 (aged 82)
- Place of death: Neptune Township, New Jersey, U.S.
- Position: Midfielder

Senior career*
Years	Team	Apps	(Gls)
–1928	Ryerson Juniors		
1928–19??	Bayonne Rovers		

International career
1928	United States	2	(1)
- * Club domestic league appearances and goals

James Aloysius Gallagher (June 8, 1909 – April 16, 1992) was an American soccer player who earned two caps with the United States national soccer team. One cap came at the 1928 Summer Olympics where the U.S. lost to Argentina in the first round. He earned his second cap in a 3–3 away draw with Poland on June 10, 1928. At the time, he played for Ryerson Juniors. He later played for Bayonne Rovers.

Born in East Newark, New Jersey, Gallagher was a longtime resident of Belmar, New Jersey, and died on April 16, 1992, at Jersey Shore University Medical Center.
