= Belmar School District =

School district in Monmouth County, New Jersey, US

Address
- 1101 Main Street Belmar, Monmouth County, New Jersey, 07719; United States
- Coordinates: 40.178285°N 74.02612°W

District information
- Grades: Pre-K to 8
- Superintendent: Jimmy Alvarez
- Business administrator: Michael Bardsley
- Schools: 1

Students and staff
- Enrollment: 405 (as of 2023–24)
- Faculty: 51.7 FTEs
- Student–teacher ratio: 7.8:1

Other information
- District Factor Group: DE
- Website: www.belmar.k12.nj.us
Ind.	Per pupil	District spending	Rank (*)	K-8 average	%± vs. average
1A	Total Spending	$17,523	25	$18,891	−7.2%
1	Budgetary Cost	13,568	24	14,159	−4.2%
2	Classroom Instruction	8,758	35	8,659	1.1%
6	Support Services	1,793	16	2,167	−17.3%
8	Administrative Cost	1,564	21	1,547	1.1%
10	Operations & Maintenance	1,221	15	1,612	−24.3%
13	Extracurricular Activities	210	53	104	101.9%
16	Median Teacher Salary	53,300	8	61,136
Data from NJDoE 2014 Taxpayers' Guide to Education Spending. *Of K-8 districts with 401-750 students. Lowest spending=1; Highest=64

The Belmar School District is a community public school district that serves students in pre-kindergarten through eighth grade from Belmar, in Monmouth County, in the U.S. state of New Jersey.

The district also serves students from Lake Como who attend as part of a sending/receiving relationship. The school was constructed in 1909 and has had additions built in 1929, 1949, 1969 and 1993. The district's one school building hosts a primary school for grades PreK-5 and a middle school for grades 6-8.

As of the 2023–24 school year, the district, comprised of one school, had an enrollment of 405 students and 51.7 classroom teachers (on an FTE basis), for a student–teacher ratio of 7.8:1.

The district had been classified by the New Jersey Department of Education as being in District Factor Group "DE", the fifth-highest of eight groupings. District Factor Groups organize districts statewide to allow comparison by common socioeconomic characteristics of the local districts. From lowest socioeconomic status to highest, the categories are A, B, CD, DE, FG, GH, I and J.

Students in ninth through twelfth grade are assigned based on sending/receiving relationships to either Manasquan High School or Asbury Park High School. Manasquan High School also serves students from Avon-by-the-Sea, Brielle, Lake Como, Sea Girt, Spring Lake and Spring Lake Heights, who attend as part of sending/receiving relationships with their respective districts. As of the 2023–24 school year, Manasquan High School had an enrollment of 945 students and 81.2 classroom teachers (on an FTE basis), for a student–teacher ratio of 11.6:1 while Asbury Park High School had an enrollment of 370 students and 36.0 classroom teachers (on an FTE basis), for a student–teacher ratio of 10.3:1.

Students may also attend Red Bank Regional High School, Marine Academy of Science and Technology, Academy of Allied Health & Science, High Technology High School, Communications High School or Biotechnology High School. Another option is Academy Charter High School, located in Lake Como, which serves residents of Allenhurst, Asbury Park, Avon-by-the-Sea, Belmar, Bradley Beach, Deal, Interlaken and Lake Como, and accepts students on a lottery basis.

== School ==
Belmar Elementary School served an enrollment of 398 students in grades PreK-8, as of the 2023–24 school year.

- Sarah Wilton, principal

== Administration ==
Core members of the district's administration are:

- Jimmy Alvarez, superintendent
- Michael Bardsley, business administrator and board secretary

== Board of education ==
The district's board of education, comprised of nine members, sets policy and oversees the fiscal and educational operation of the district through its administration. As a Type II school district, the board's trustees are elected directly by voters to serve three-year terms of office on a staggered basis, with three seats up for election each year held (since 2012) as part of the November general election. The board appoints a superintendent to oversee the district's day-to-day operations and a business administrator to supervise the business functions of the district. Lake Como is also represented with a member of the board of education.
