= Belmar, New Jersey =

Borough in Monmouth County, New Jersey, US

- Borough
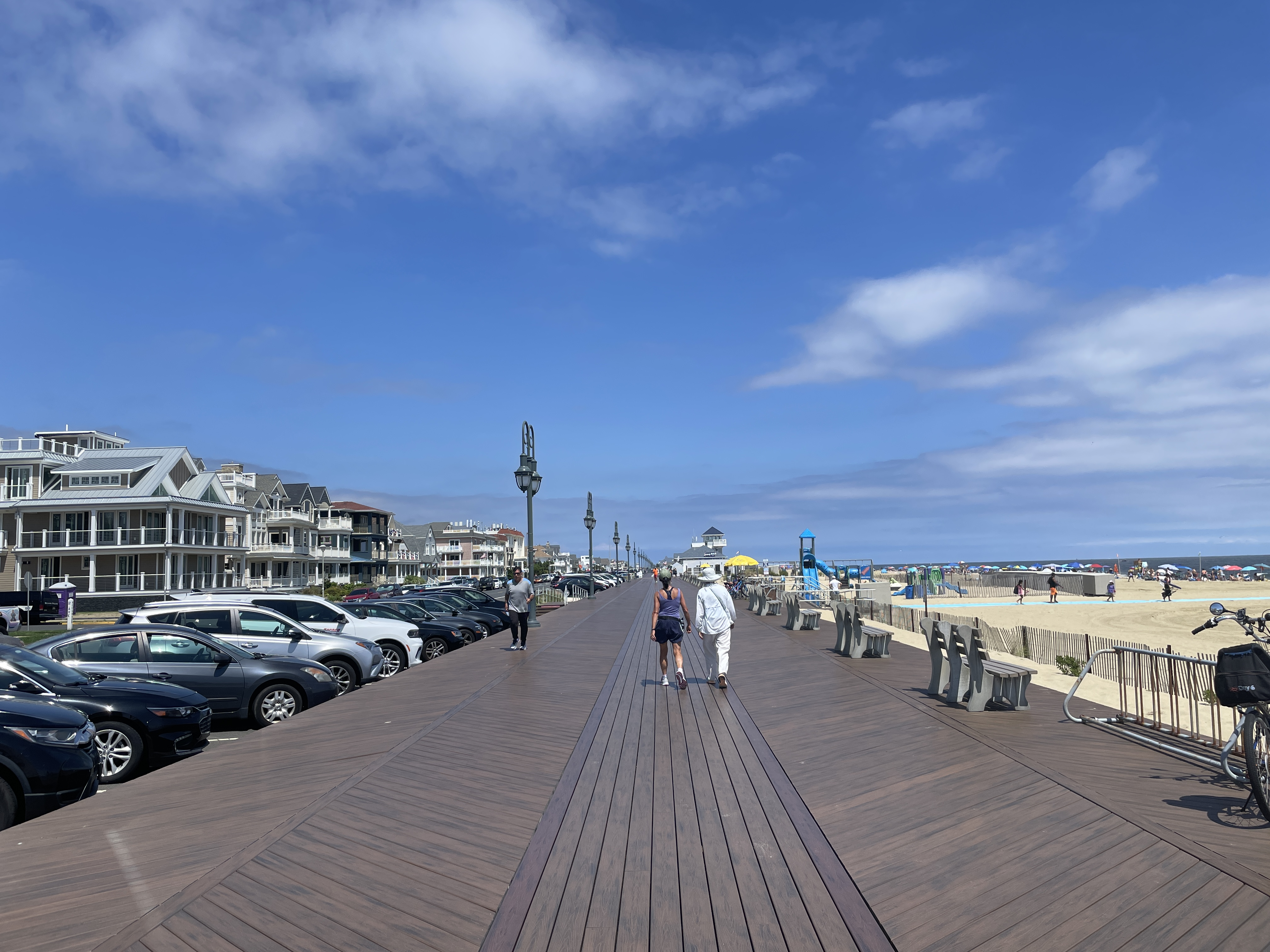
- Boardwalk along the Atlantic Ocean shoreline in Belmar

- logo

- Location of Belmar in Monmouth County highlighted in red (left). Inset map: Location of Monmouth County in New Jersey highlighted in orange (right).

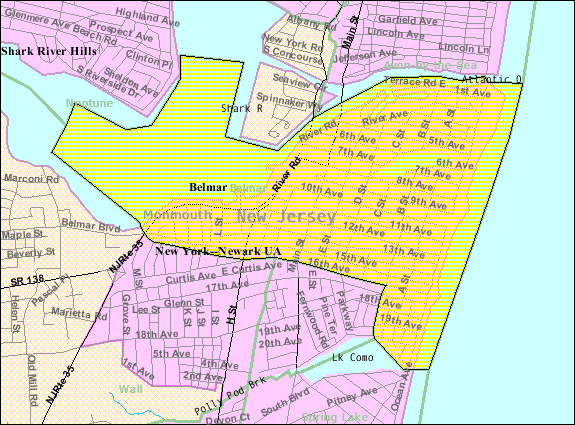
- Census Bureau map of Belmar, New Jersey

- Location in Monmouth County Location in New Jersey Location in the United States
- Coordinates: 40.180°N 74.024°W
- Country: United States
- State: New Jersey
- County: Monmouth
- Incorporated: April 9, 1885 as Ocean Beach borough
- Renamed: April 16, 1889 as City of Elcho borough
- Renamed: May 14, 1889 as City of Belmar borough
- Renamed: November 20, 1890 as Borough of Belmar
- Named after: Italian language "beautiful sea"

Government
  - Type: Faulkner Act (small municipality)
  - Body: Borough Council
  - Mayor: Caitlin Donovan (D, appointed to term ending December 31, 2026)
  - Administrator: Kevin A. Kane
  - Municipal clerk: April Claudio

Area
  - Total: 1.61 sq mi (4.18 km^{2})
  - Land: 1.05 sq mi (2.71 km^{2})
  - Water: 0.57 sq mi (1.48 km^{2}) 35.19%
  - Rank: 437th of 565 in state 35th of 53 in county
- Elevation: 13 ft (4.0 m)

Population (2020)
  - Total: 5,907
  - Estimate (2023): 5,816
  - Rank: 351st of 565 in state 30th of 53 in county
  - Density: 5,652.6/sq mi (2,182.5/km^{2})
  - Rank: 98th of 565 in state 10th of 53 in county
- Time zone: UTC−05:00 (Eastern (EST))
  - Summer (DST): UTC−04:00 (Eastern (EDT))
- ZIP Codes: 07715, 07719
- Area codes: 732 exchange: 681
- FIPS code: 3402504930
- GNIS feature ID: 0885155
- Website: www.belmar.com

Belmar is a borough located on the Jersey Shore in Monmouth County, in the U.S. state of New Jersey. As of the 2020 United States census, the borough's population was 5,907, an increase of 113 (+2.0%) from the 2010 census count of 5,794, which in turn reflected a decline of 251 (−4.2%) from the 6,045 counted in the 2000 census.

What is now Belmar was originally incorporated as Ocean Beach borough by an act of the New Jersey Legislature on April 9, 1885, from portions of Wall Township, based on the results of a referendum held two days earlier. On April 16, 1889, it became the City of Elcho borough, which lasted for a few weeks until the name was changed to the City of Belmar Borough on May 14, 1889. The city acquired its current name, Borough of Belmar, on November 20, 1890. The borough's name means "beautiful sea" in Italian.

== Geography ==
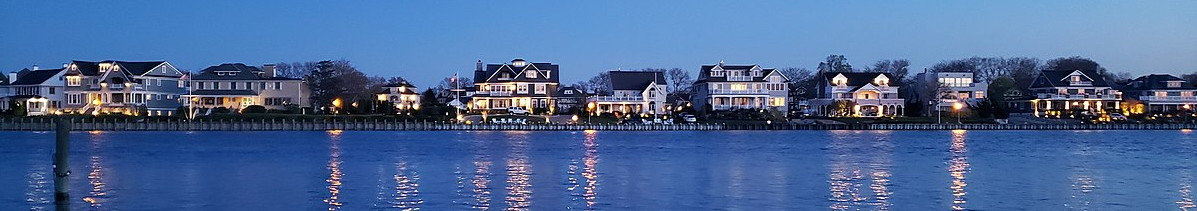
View of Belmar, New Jersey from across Shark River.

According to the United States Census Bureau, the borough had a total area of 1.62 square miles (4.18 km^{2}), including 1.05 square miles (2.71 km^{2}) of land and 0.57 square miles (1.48 km^{2}) of water (35.19%).

Belmar borders the Atlantic Ocean to the east, and the Monmouth County municipalities of Avon-by-the-Sea to the north, Neptune Township to the northwest, Wall Township to the west, and Lake Como and Spring Lake to the south.

== Demographics ==
Historical population
Census	Pop.	Note	%±
1900	902		—
1910	1,433		58.9%
1920	1,987		38.7%
1930	3,491		75.7%
1940	3,435		−1.6%
1950	4,636		35.0%
1960	5,190		11.9%
1970	5,782		11.4%
1980	6,771		17.1%
1990	5,877		−13.2%
2000	6,045		2.9%
2010	5,794		−4.2%
2020	5,907		2.0%
2023 (est.)	5,816	▼	−1.5%
Population sources: 1900–1920; 1900–1910 1910–1930; 1940–2000; 2010 2020

=== 2020 census ===
As of the 2020 census, Belmar had a population of 5,907. The median age was 45.7 years. 13.6% of residents were under the age of 18 and 19.7% of residents were 65 years of age or older. For every 100 females there were 99.4 males, and for every 100 females age 18 and over there were 97.7 males age 18 and over.

100.0% of residents lived in urban areas, while 0.0% lived in rural areas.

There were 2,867 households in Belmar, of which 15.1% had children under the age of 18 living in them. Of all households, 33.6% were married-couple households, 27.3% were households with a male householder and no spouse or partner present, and 31.1% were households with a female householder and no spouse or partner present. About 42.0% of all households were made up of individuals and 13.2% had someone living alone who was 65 years of age or older.

There were 4,066 housing units, of which 29.5% were vacant. The homeowner vacancy rate was 1.2% and the rental vacancy rate was 6.5%.

Racial composition as of the 2020 census
Race	Number	Percent
White	4,724	80.0%
Black or African American	111	1.9%
American Indian and Alaska Native	74	1.3%
Asian	72	1.2%
Native Hawaiian and Other Pacific Islander	0	0.0%
Some other race	485	8.2%
Two or more races	441	7.5%
Hispanic or Latino (of any race)	963	16.3%

=== 2010 census ===
The 2010 United States census counted 5,794 people, 2,695 households, and 1,267 families in the borough. The population density was 5,544.0 per square mile (2,140.6/km^{2}). There were 3,931 housing units at an average density of 3,761.4 per square mile (1,452.3/km^{2}). The racial makeup was 87.06% (5,044) White, 3.49% (202) Black or African American, 0.24% (14) Native American, 0.91% (53) Asian, 0.14% (8) Pacific Islander, 5.66% (328) from other races, and 2.50% (145) from two or more races. Hispanic or Latino of any race were 16.76% (971) of the population.

Of the 2,695 households, 18.1% had children under the age of 18; 33.9% were married couples living together; 8.8% had a female householder with no husband present and 53.0% were non-families. Of all households, 41.9% were made up of individuals and 12.1% had someone living alone who was 65 years of age or older. The average household size was 2.14 and the average family size was 2.98.

16.8% of the population were under the age of 18, 8.3% from 18 to 24, 29.1% from 25 to 44, 30.9% from 45 to 64, and 14.8% who were 65 years of age or older. The median age was 41.9 years. For every 100 females, the population had 106.3 males. For every 100 females ages 18 and older there were 108.3 males.

The Census Bureau's 2006–2010 American Community Survey showed that (in 2010 inflation-adjusted dollars) median household income was $59,928 (with a margin of error of ± $6,993) and the median family income was $59,929 (± $10,255). Males had a median income of $52,215 (± $4,278) versus $44,453 (± $11,259) for females. The per capita income for the borough was $35,223 (± $4,105). About 9.2% of families and 12.8% of the population were below the poverty line, including 16.6% of those under age 18 and 10.6% of those age 65 or over.

=== 2000 census ===
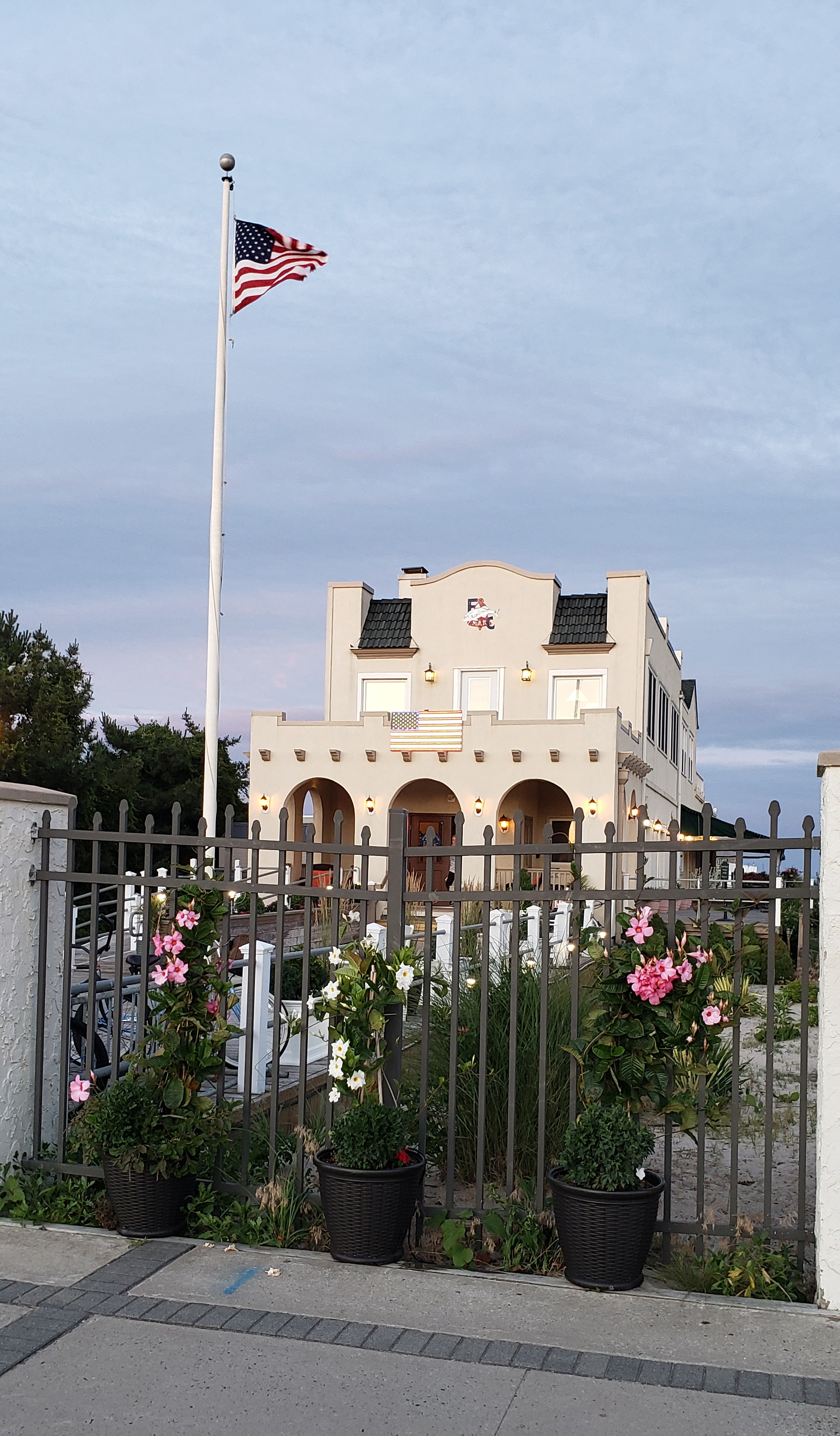
Belmar Fishing Club, a Belmar landmark, 2021

As of the 2000 United States census there were 6,045 people, 2,946 households, and 1,316 families residing in the borough. The population density was 5,921.7 inhabitants per square mile (2,286.4/km^{2}). There were 3,996 housing units at an average density of 3,914.5 per square mile (1,511.4/km^{2}). The racial makeup of the borough was 91.53% White, 3.46% Black, 0.18% Native American, 1.03% Asian, 1.99% from other races, and 1.82% from two or more races. Hispanic or Latino of any race were 6.85% of the population.

As of the 2000 Census, 28.2% of Belmar's residents were of Irish ancestry, the 12th highest of any municipality in New Jersey, for all communities in which at least 1,000 people listed their ancestry.

There were 2,946 households, out of which 17.2% had children under the age of 18 living with them, 32.0% were married couples living together, 9.0% had a female householder with no husband present, and 55.3% were non-families. 44.3% of all households were made up of individuals, and 12.1% had someone living alone who was 65 years of age or older. The average household size was 2.05 and the average family size was 2.92.

In the borough the population was spread out, with 17.2% under the age of 18, 7.6% from 18 to 24, 36.7% from 25 to 44, 22.7% from 45 to 64, and 15.7% who were 65 years of age or older. The median age was 38 years. For every 100 females, there were 99.8 males. For every 100 females age 18 and over, there were 99.2 males.

The median income for a household in the borough was $44,896, and the median income for a family was $61,250. Males had a median income of $40,557 versus $34,323 for females. The per capita income for the borough was $29,456. About 4.5% of families and 8.6% of the population were below the poverty line, including 11.3% of those under age 18 and 7.9% of those age 65 or over.

== Parks and recreation ==
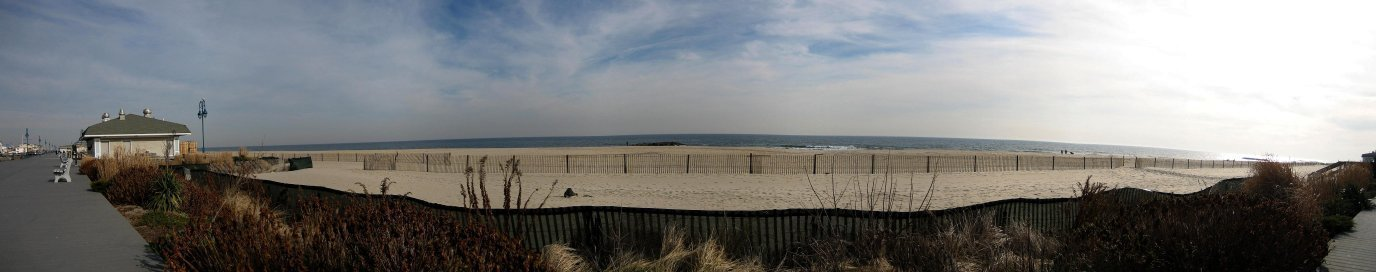
Panorama of Belmar's beach from 9th Ave. and Ocean Ave.

Belmar is a popular vacation destination because of its natural and recreational resources and close proximity to New York and Philadelphia. It features wide beaches for sunbathing, surfing, swimming, and fishing. The boardwalk and town offer shops, restaurants, an active arts scene, sporting events, festivals, and a variety of family-oriented activities (see "Annual Events" below). Belmar sits on the south side of the Shark River and boasts a large municipal marina in the bay and on the inlet itself, including the only private marina in town, Seaport Inlet Marina.

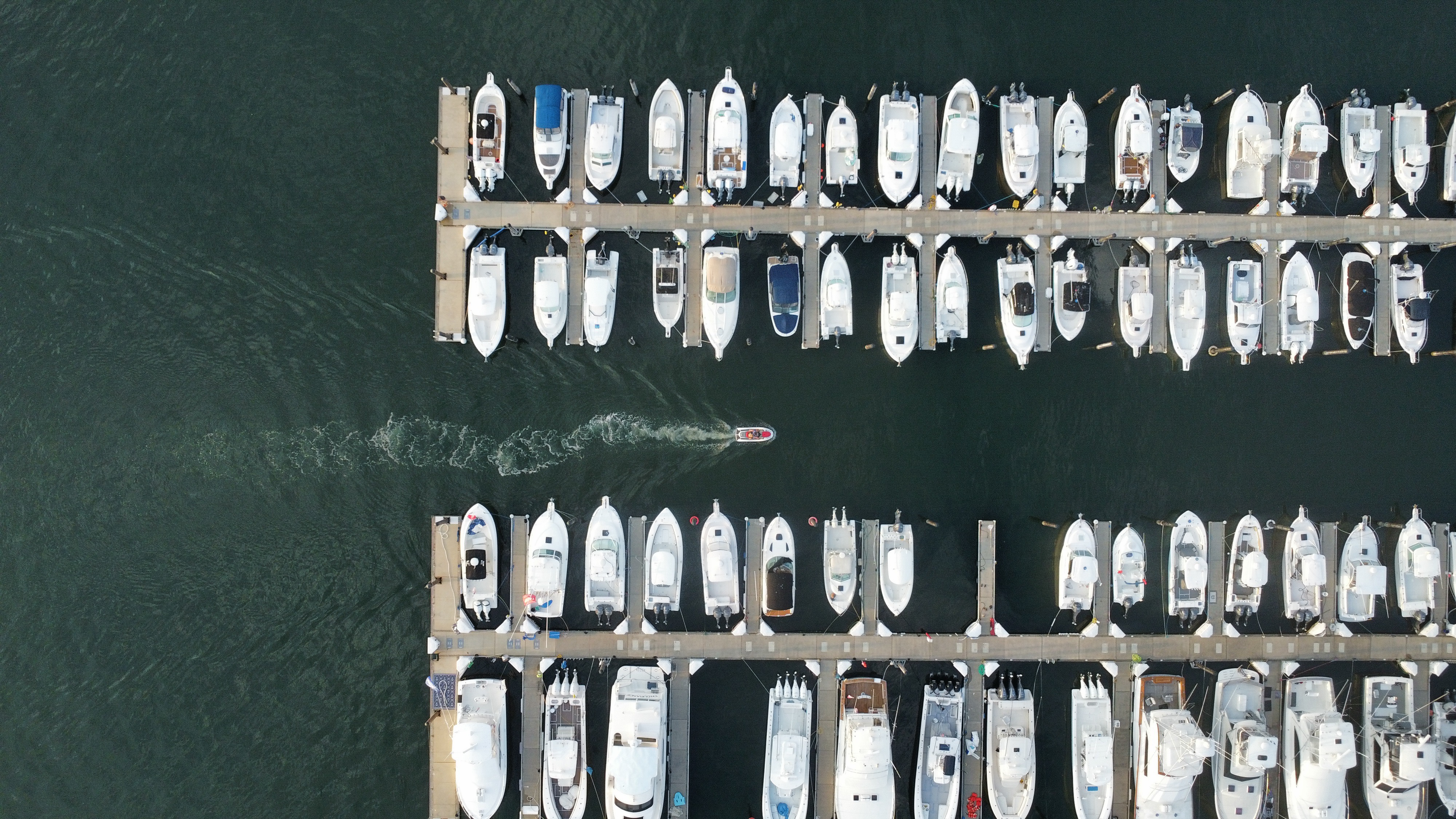
Overhead view of Belmar Marina.

Belmar beach (as well as those of municipalities to the south, such as Manasquan and Point Pleasant) is among the most popular surf spots on the East Coast. Belmar frequently hosts surfing events and competitions. Along with surfing, Belmar also has an active skate community and skatepark constructed by American Ramp Company.

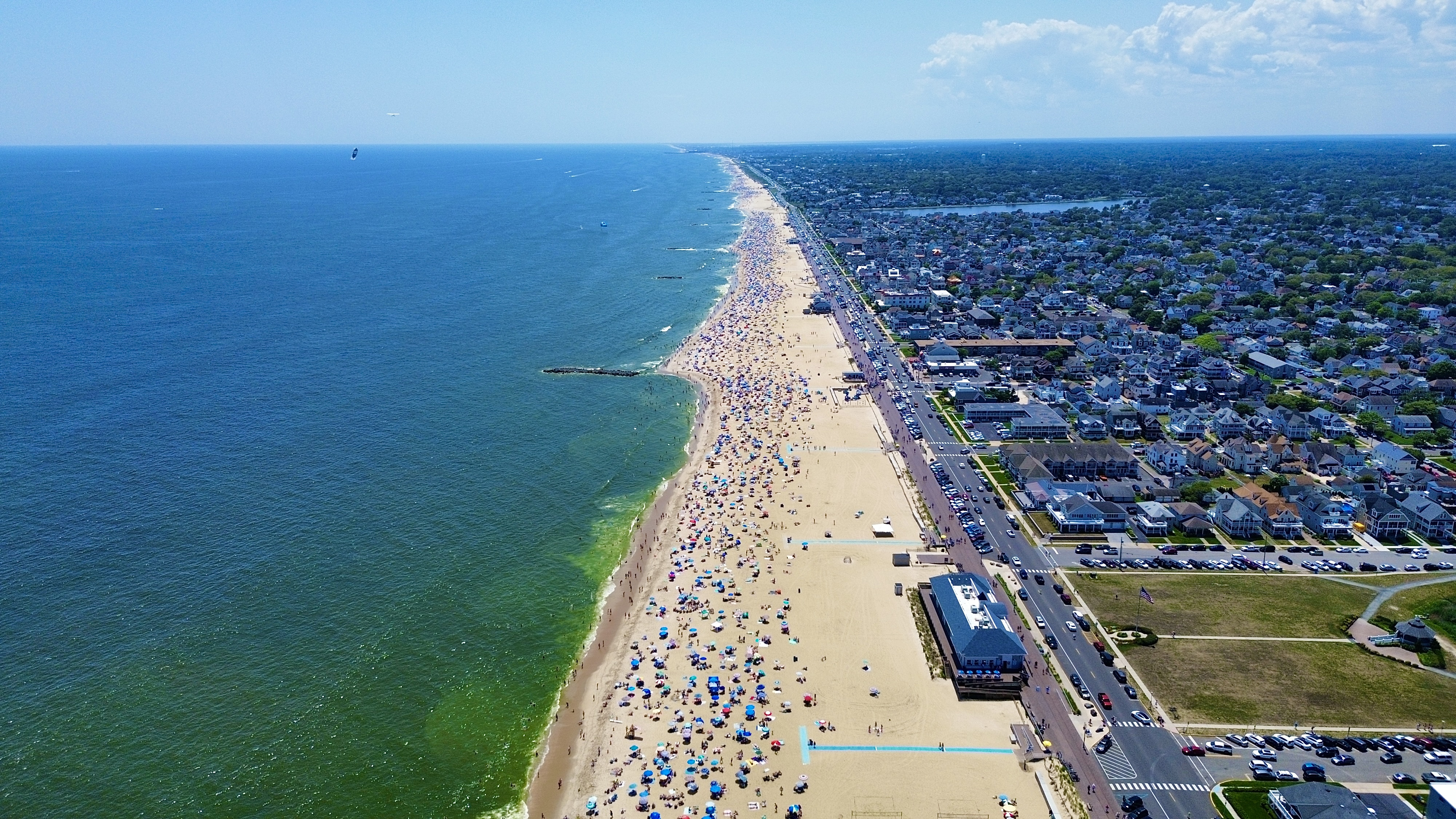
A view of Belmar beach from 2nd Avenue looking south on July 23, 2023.

The Jersey Shore Basketball League, a competitive summer basketball league, takes place at St. Rose High School every summer.

The Belmar Arts Council (BAC) sponsors regular art shows, workshops, concerts, and performances year around. BAC's gallery and workshop, the Boatworks, is located at 608 River Road near the Shark River Inlet.

== Government ==
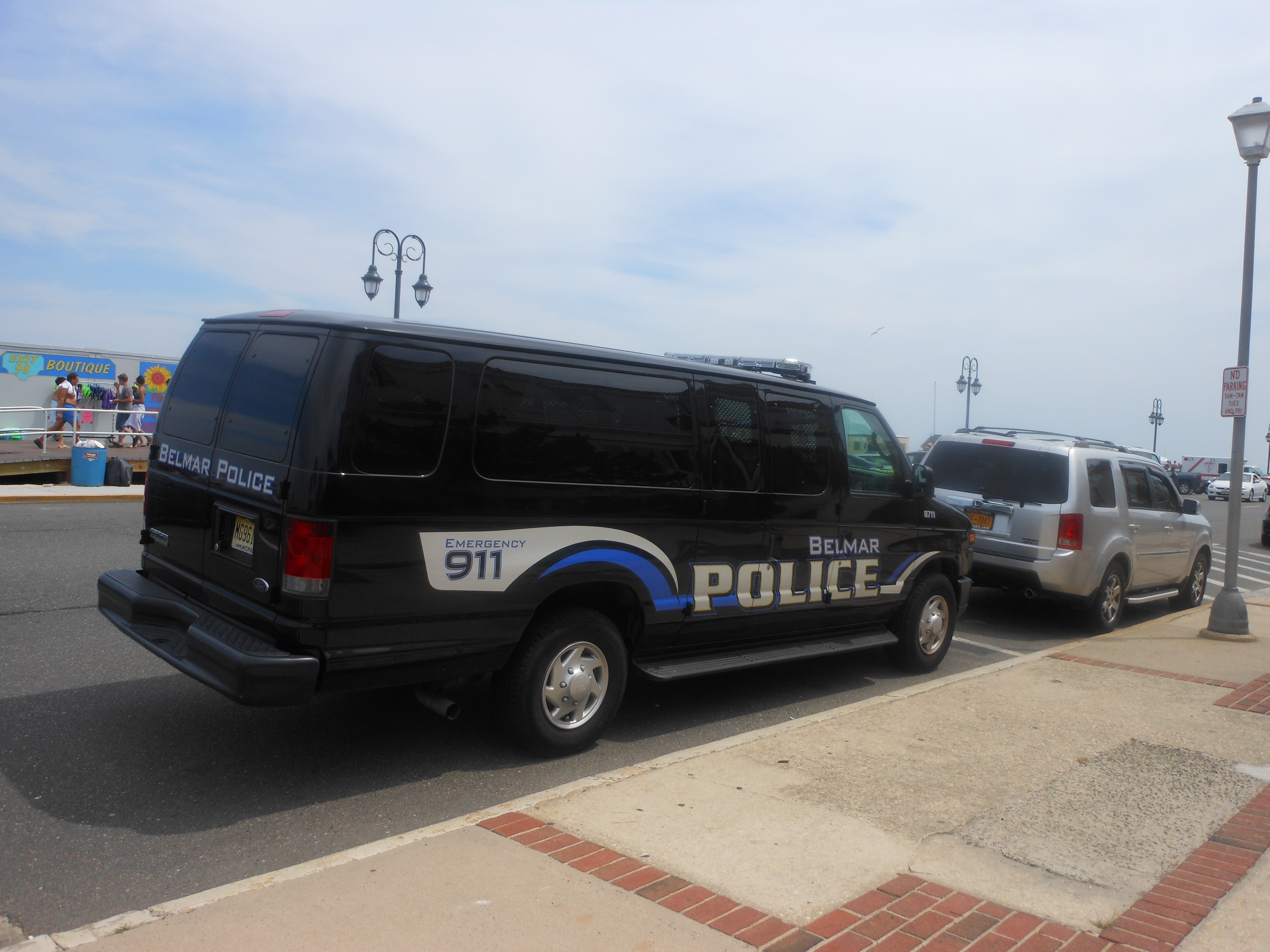
Belmar Police Van

=== Local government ===
In July 1990, the voters of Belmar overwhelmingly passed a referendum changing Belmar's form of government from a three-person, non-partisan commission form of government under the Walsh Act to the Small Municipality plan 3 form of government under the Faulkner Act. This referendum followed nine months of research, analysis and hearings by a Charter Study Commission elected by the residents at a referendum that passed in November 1989 and implemented effective January 1, 1991. The borough is one of 18 municipalities (of the 564) statewide that use this form of government, which is only available to municipalities with fewer than 12,000 residents at the time of adoption.

Under the version of the Small Municipality Plan form applicable to Belmar, the Borough Council is comprised of four members who are elected to staggered, three-year terms at partisan elections each year as part of the November general election, with either one or two seats up for vote in a three-year cycle. The Mayor is directly elected by the voters for a four-year term and serves as Belmar's chief executive officer, overseeing the day-to-day operations of the Borough. The Mayor sits as a member of the council, chairs Council meetings and is able to vote as a member of the council, but has no veto over the council's actions.

As of 2026, the Mayor of Belmar is Democrat Caitlin Donovan, whose term of office ends December 31, 2026. Members of the Belmar Borough Council are Council President Jodi Kinney (R, 2027), Kevin Moroney (R, 2028), and Michael DeBlasio (R, 2028).

=== Federal, state and county representation ===
Belmar is located in the 4th Congressional District and is part of New Jersey's 30th state legislative district.

For the 119th United States Congress, New Jersey's 4th congressional district is represented by Chris Smith (R, Manchester Township). New Jersey is represented in the United States Senate by Democrats Cory Booker (Newark, term ends 2027) and Andy Kim (Moorestown, term ends 2031).

For the 2026–2027 session, the 30th legislative district of the New Jersey Legislature is represented in the State Senate by Robert Singer (R, Lakewood Township) and in the General Assembly by Sean T. Kean (R, Wall Township) and Avi Schnall (D, Lakewood Township).

Monmouth County is governed by a Board of County Commissioners composed of five members who are elected at-large to serve three-year terms of office on a staggered basis, with either one or two seats up for election each year as part of the November general election. At an annual reorganization meeting held in the beginning of January, the board selects one of its members to serve as director and another as deputy director.

As of 2025, Monmouth County's Commissioners are Director Thomas A. Arnone (R, Neptune City, 2025), Susan M. Kiley (R, Hazlet Township, 2027), Erik Anderson (R, Shrewsbury, 2026), Nick DiRocco (R, Wall Township, 2025), and Deputy Director Ross F. Licitra (R, Marlboro Township, 2026).

Constitutional officers elected on a countywide basis are Clerk Christine Giordano Hanlon (R, 2025; Ocean Township), Sheriff Shaun Golden (R, 2025; Howell Township) and Surrogate Rosemarie D. Peters (R, 2026; Middletown Township).

=== Politics ===
United States presidential election results for Belmar
Year	Republican		Democratic		Third party(ies)	
Year	No.	%	No.	%	No.	%
2024	1,805	52.20%	1,574	45.52%	79	2.28%
2020	1,784	49.93%	1,716	48.03%	73	2.04%
2016	1,596	53.06%	1,279	42.52%	133	4.42%
2012	1,310	51.53%	1,196	47.05%	36	1.42%
2008	1,389	50.24%	1,332	48.17%	44	1.59%
2004	1,394	50.64%	1,327	48.20%	32	1.16%
2000	1,106	42.64%	1,312	50.58%	176	6.78%
1996	864	35.09%	1,277	51.87%	321	13.04%
1992	1,142	39.85%	1,135	39.60%	589	20.55%

As of March 2011, there were a total of 3,823 registered voters in Belmar, of which 1,074 (28.1%) were registered as Democrats, 765 (20.0%) were registered as Republicans and 1,982 (51.8%) were registered as Unaffiliated. There were two voters registered as either Libertarians or Greens.

In the 2012 presidential election, Republican Mitt Romney received 51.5% of the vote (1,310 cast), ahead of Democrat Barack Obama with 47.0% (1,196 votes), and other candidates with 1.4% (36 votes), among the 2,584 ballots cast by the borough's 4,011 registered voters (42 ballots were spoiled), for a turnout of 64.4%. In the 2008 presidential election, Republican John McCain received 49.5% of the vote (1,389 cast), ahead of Democrat Barack Obama with 47.4% (1,332 votes) and other candidates with 1.6% (44 votes), among the 2,808 ballots cast by the borough's 3,938 registered voters, for a turnout of 71.3%. In the 2004 presidential election, Republican George W. Bush received 50.4% of the vote (1,394 ballots cast), outpolling Democrat John Kerry with 48.0% (1,327 votes) and other candidates with 0.8% (32 votes), among the 2,764 ballots cast by the borough's 4,014 registered voters, for a turnout percentage of 68.9.

Gubernatorial election results for Belmar
Year	Republican		Democratic		Third party(ies)	
Year	No.	%	No.	%	No.	%
2025	1,487	51.29%	1,400	48.29%	12	0.41%
2021	1,411	57.62%	1,011	41.28%	27	1.10%
2017	1,037	52.01%	899	45.09%	58	2.91%
2013	1,440	70.59%	555	27.21%	45	2.21%
2009	1,173	57.93%	694	34.27%	158	7.80%
2005	942	47.50%	942	47.50%	99	4.99%

In the 2013 gubernatorial election, Republican Chris Christie received 70.6% of the vote (1,440 cast), ahead of Democrat Barbara Buono with 27.2% (555 votes), and other candidates with 2.2% (45 votes), among the 2,096 ballots cast by the borough's 4,043 registered voters (56 ballots were spoiled), for a turnout of 51.8%. In the 2009 gubernatorial election, Republican Chris Christie received 57.4% of the vote (1,173 ballots cast), ahead of Democrat Jon Corzine with 34.0% (694 votes), Independent Chris Daggett with 6.8% (138 votes) and other candidates with 1.0% (20 votes), among the 2,044 ballots cast by the borough's 3,698 registered voters, yielding a 55.3% turnout.

United States Senate election results for Belmar1
Year	Republican		Democratic		Third party(ies)	
Year	No.	%	No.	%	No.	%
2024	1,728	51.54%	1,550	46.23%	75	2.24%
2018	1,187	52.73%	1,057	46.96%	7	0.31%
2012	1,197	49.98%	1,150	48.02%	48	2.00%
2006	1,090	53.38%	891	43.63%	61	2.99%

United States Senate election results for Belmar2
Year	Republican		Democratic		Third party(ies)	
Year	No.	%	No.	%	No.	%
2020	1,789	51.00%	1,643	46.84%	76	2.17%
2014	1,066	50.28%	983	46.37%	71	3.35%
2013	630	54.88%	503	43.82%	15	1.31%
2008	1,229	47.23%	1,295	49.77%	78	3.00%

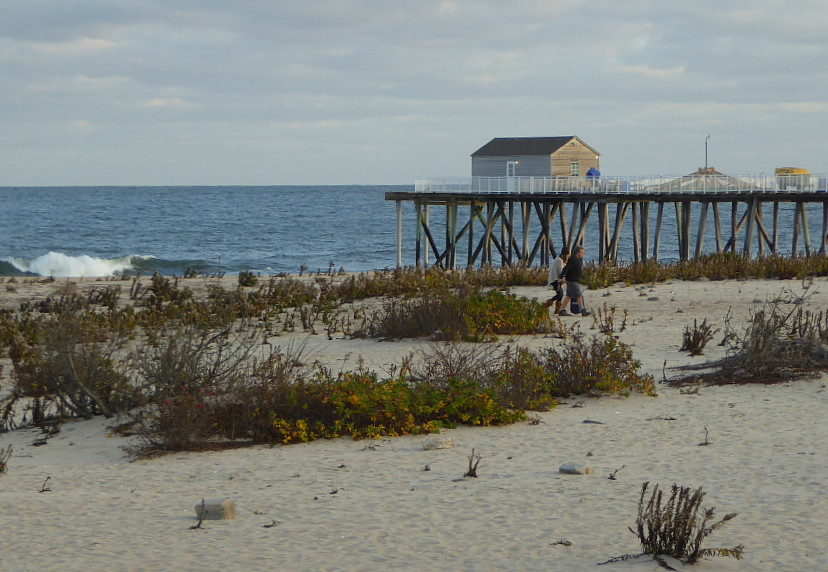
Belmar Fishing Club Pier in 2015

== Education ==
The Belmar School District serves students in public school for pre-kindergarten through eighth grade at Belmar Elementary School. As of the 2020–21 school year, the district, comprised of one school, had an enrollment of 448 students and 52.8 classroom teachers (on an FTE basis), for a student–teacher ratio of 8.5:1. The district also serves students from Lake Como who attend as part of a sending/receiving relationship. The school was constructed in 1909 and has had additions built in 1929, 1949, 1969 and 1993. There are 61 certified staff members, including the district's administrators, teachers, nurses and child study team personnel, with an additional 12 paraprofessionals. The single school facility is two schools in one, a primary school for Pre-K–5 and a middle school structure for 6–8.

Students attending public high school for ninth through twelfth grades are assigned to either Manasquan High School or Asbury Park High School based on sending/receiving relationships with the Manasquan Public Schools and Asbury Park Public Schools, respectively. Manasquan High School also serves students from Avon-by-the-Sea, Brielle, Lake Como, Sea Girt, Spring Lake, Spring Lake Heights who attend as part of sending/receiving relationships with their respective districts. As of the 2020–21 school year, Manasquan High School had an enrollment of 1,006 students and 76.9 classroom teachers (on an FTE basis), for a student–teacher ratio of 13.1:1, while Asbury Park High School had an enrollment of 682 students and 54.5 classroom teachers (on an FTE basis), for a student–teacher ratio of 12.5:1.

Students may also attend Red Bank Regional High School, Marine Academy of Science and Technology, Academy of Allied Health & Science, Academy Charter School, High Technology High School, Communications High School or Biotechnology High School.

Students also have the option to attend Academy Charter High School in Lake Como, which accepts students on a lottery basis from the communities of Allenhurst, Asbury Park, Avon-by-the-Sea, Belmar, Bradley Beach, Deal, Interlaken and Lake Como.

Belmar is home of St. Rose High School, which was established in 1923 by the local parish and the Sisters of St. Joseph, and operates under the auspices of the Roman Catholic Diocese of Trenton.

Mesivta Keser Torah of Central Jersey, a yeshiva and high school for men that serves Haredi students mainly from Lakewood Township, Deal and Brooklyn, has been in the borough since the 1920s.

The Belmar Public Library is one of New Jersey's original 36 Carnegie libraries.

== Transportation ==
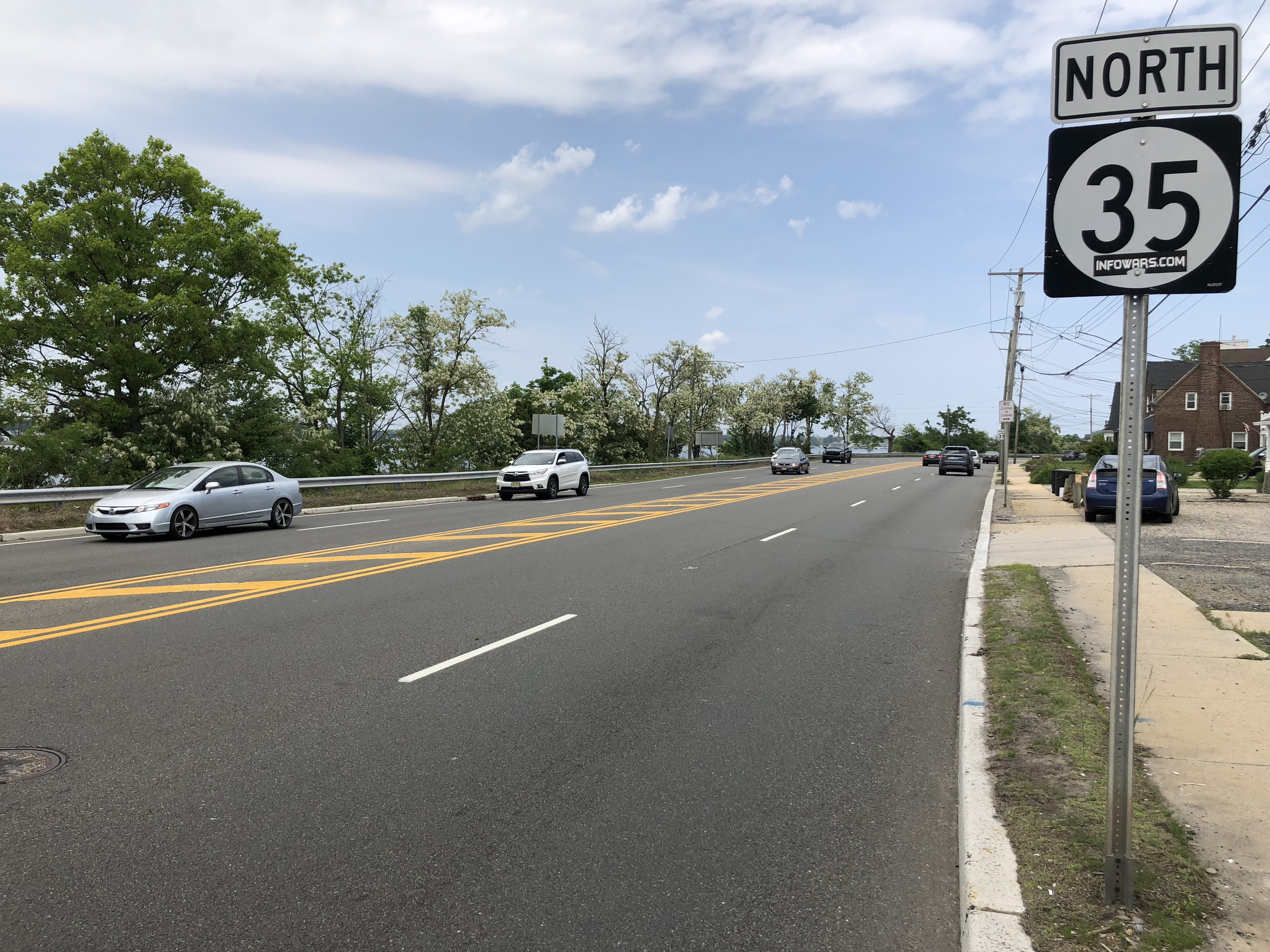
Route 35 in Belmar

=== Roads and highways ===
As of May 2010, the borough had a total of 26.12 miles (42.04 km) of roadways, of which 20.85 miles (33.55 km) were maintained by the municipality, 3.40 miles (5.47 km) by Monmouth County and 1.87 miles (3.01 km) by the New Jersey Department of Transportation.

Route 35 and Route 71 are the two main highways that pass through Belmar. The closest limited access roads are all in neighboring Wall Township: Route 18, the Garden State Parkway and Interstate 195.

=== Public transportation ===
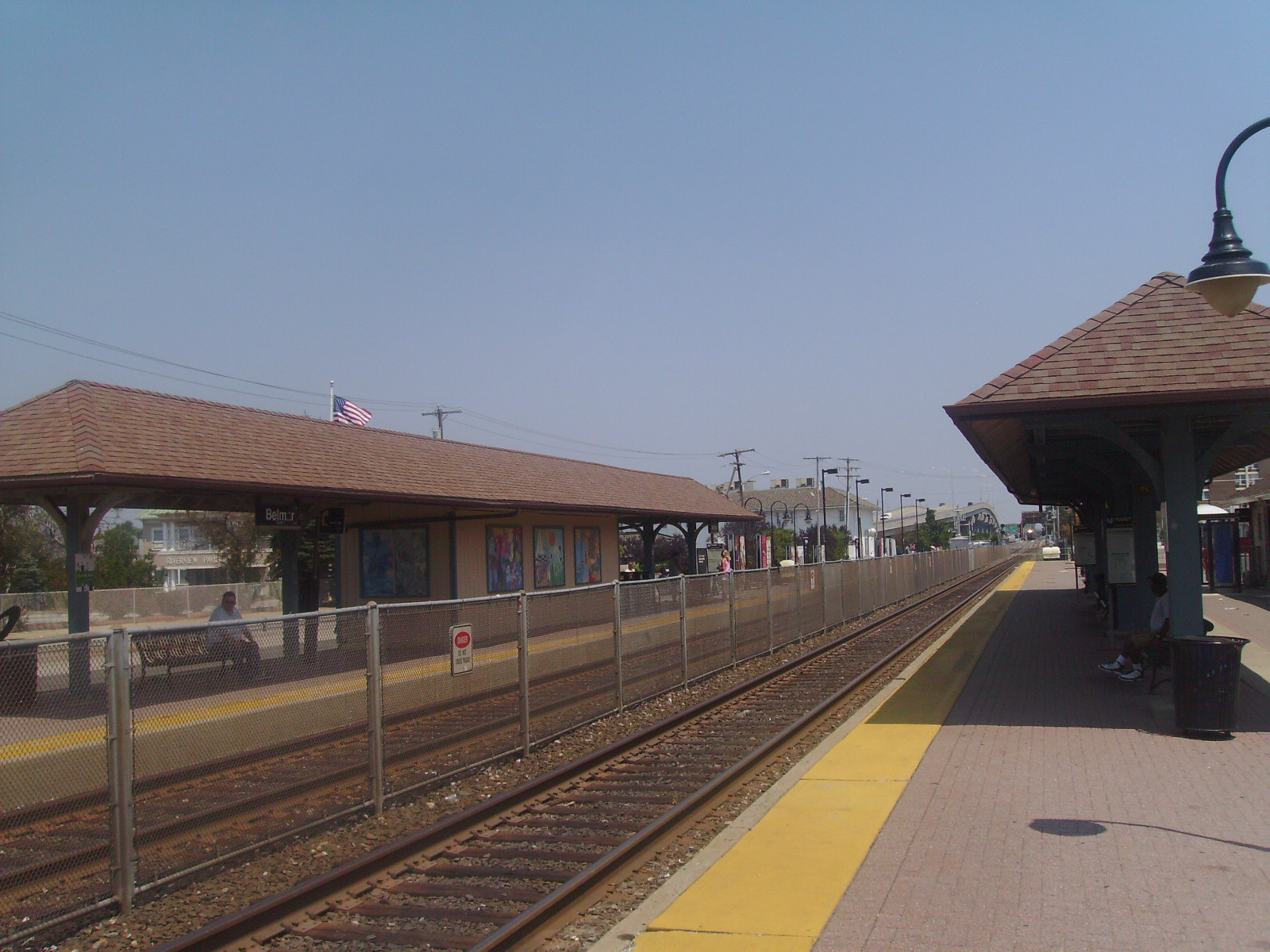
Belmar station, which is served by NJ Transit's North Jersey Coast Line

NJ Transit provides rail transportation at the Belmar station to and from New York Penn Station in Midtown Manhattan, Newark Penn Station and Hoboken Terminal on the North Jersey Coast Line. New Jersey Transit also provides bus transportation between Belmar and Philadelphia on the 317 route and service on the 830 route.

=== Airport ===
Monmouth Executive Airport is a public-use airport located west of Belmar in Wall Township.

== Sports ==
The Jersey Shore Breaks of 94x50 League have played their home games at St. Rose High School since 2026.

== Annual events ==
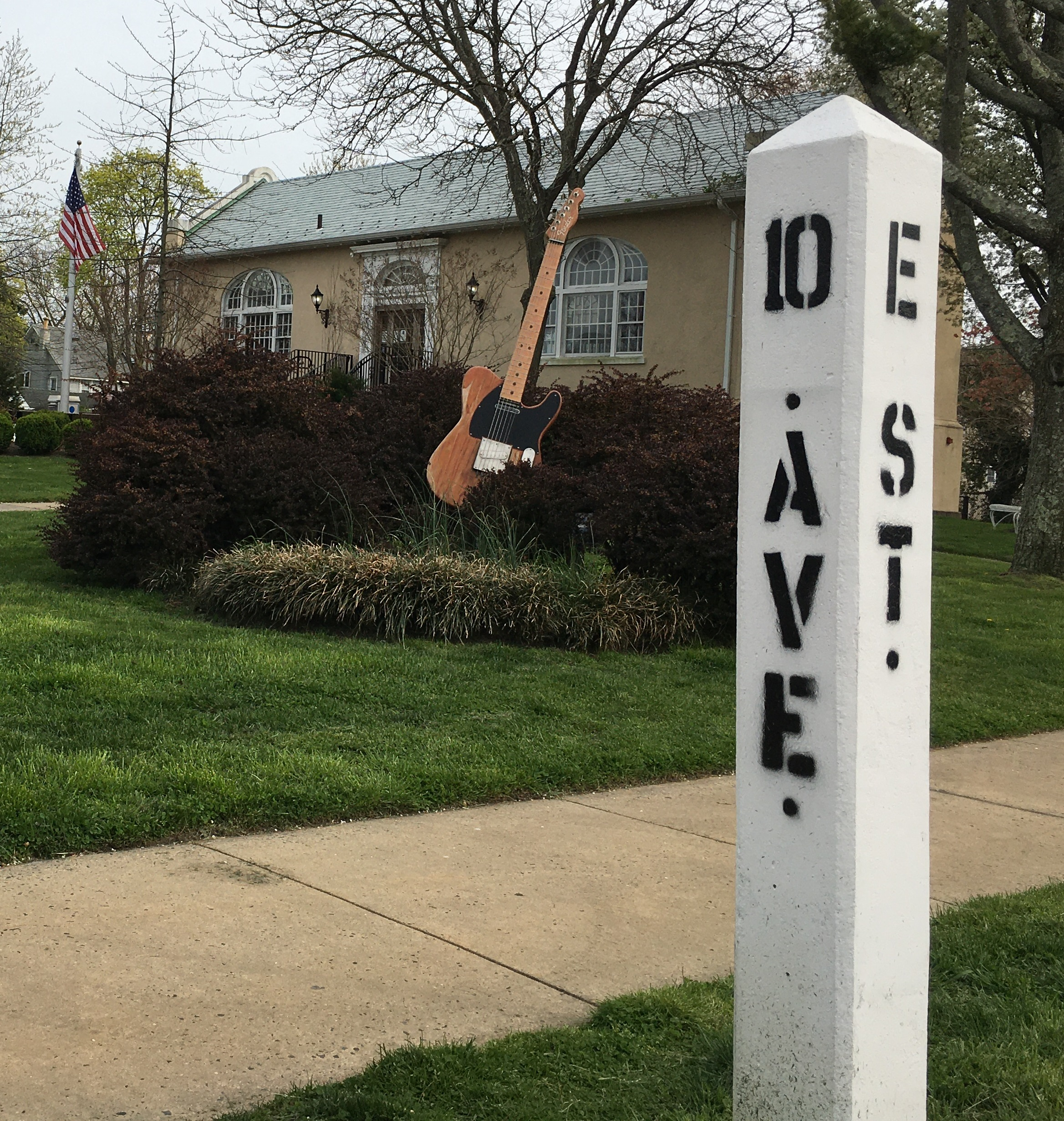
The intersection of E Street & 10th Avenue in Belmar, which inspired Bruce Springsteen's naming of the E Street Band. A large replica of Springsteen's Fender Esquire guitar has been placed there. The Belmar Public Library is behind the guitar.

- Belmar 5 Mile Johnny Cobb Memorial Run
- New Jersey Seafood Festival celebrated its 30th year in 2016. The festival, which attracted an estimated 200,000 visitors in 2015, had to be modified in scope to allow the borough to cope with the volumes of traffic.
- New Jersey Sand Castle Contest, which featured 200 participants at the 27th annual event in 2013
- St. Patrick's Day Parade, which celebrated its 50th anniversary in 2023
- Belmar Pro Surf Contest
- Belmar Fall Festival
- Belmar Holiday Tree Lighting Ceremony
- Belmar Spring Kite Festival
- Howard Rowland Memorial Lifeguard Tournament – an bi-annual tournament of lifeguard teams from the Jersey Shore
- Meters for Mike
- Belmar Sprint Triathlon
- The Jersey Shore Relay Run, which has a leg that goes through Belmar
- Surfer's Healing

== Sister city ==
In August 2008, the borough established a Sister City relationship with Balbriggan, a town of nearly 16,000 in County Dublin, Ireland.

== Community ==
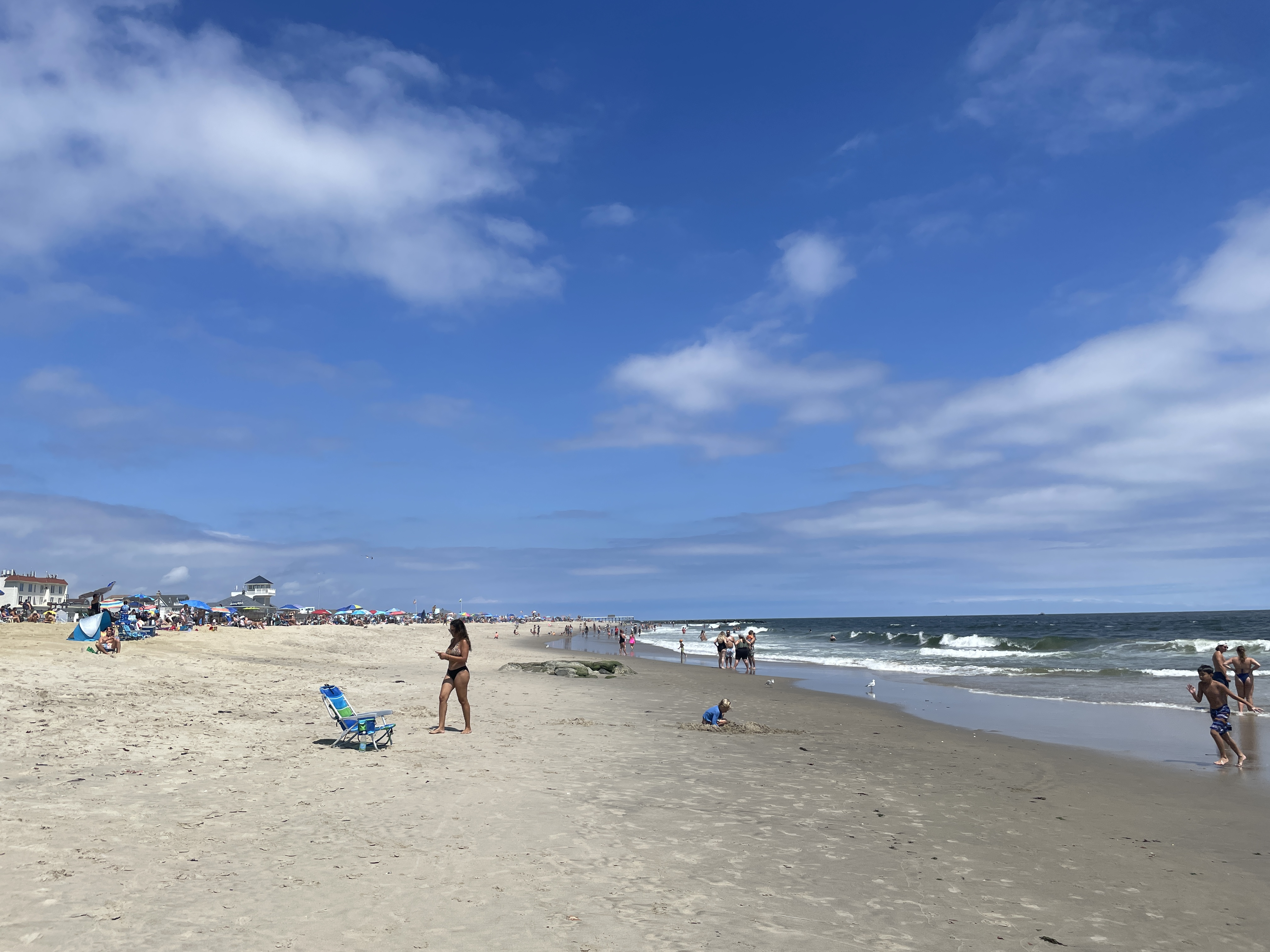
Beach in Belmar

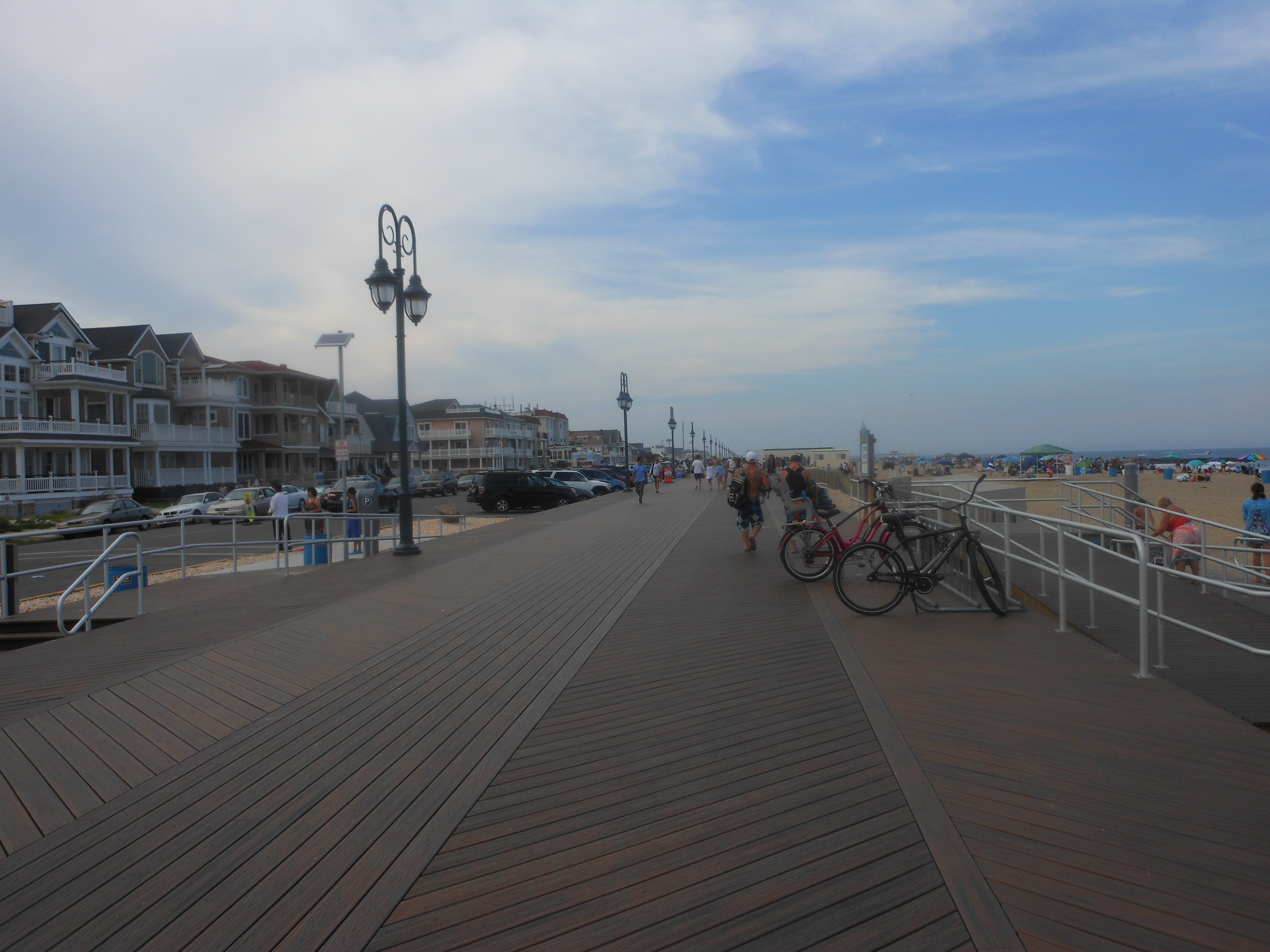
Renovated Belmar Boardwalk after Hurricane Sandy in 2013

- Belmar was home to the first and oldest first-aid squad in the United States. The Squad, organized in 1927 ceased operations in 2021.
- Belmar's "E" Street is the original source of Bruce Springsteen's E Street Band. Springsteen's original keyboardist, David Sancious, was a resident of E Street in Belmar at the time the band was formed. The Sancious' family home was often used as a practice venue where they honed their musical craft in the formative pre-fame years.
- Monmouth Executive Airport in nearby Wall Township is designated with the call letters "BLM" based on its initial name of Belmar Airport.
- In the HBO series The Sopranos, Belmar is shown as the home port of Tony Soprano's boat, the Stugots.
- Guy Fieri featured Belmar and local restaurant 10th Avenue Burrito in an episode of Food Network's Diners, Drive-Ins, and Dives which originally aired on December 13, 2010.

== Climate ==
According to the Köppen climate classification system, Belmar has a Humid subtropical climate (Cfa).

Climate data for Belmar (40.1782, -74.0220), Elevation 10 ft (3 m), 1991–2020 normals, extremes 1981–2022
Month	Jan	Feb	Mar	Apr	May	Jun	Jul	Aug	Sep	Oct	Nov	Dec	Year
Record high °F (°C)	71.4 (21.9)	78.6 (25.9)	82.2 (27.9)	89.5 (31.9)	94.8 (34.9)	96.8 (36.0)	99.7 (37.6)	100.2 (37.9)	97.5 (36.4)	93.6 (34.2)	80.2 (26.8)	74.7 (23.7)	100.2 (37.9)
Mean daily maximum °F (°C)	40.9 (4.9)	42.6 (5.9)	48.6 (9.2)	58.7 (14.8)	68.2 (20.1)	77.8 (25.4)	83.2 (28.4)	81.6 (27.6)	75.8 (24.3)	65.3 (18.5)	55.0 (12.8)	46.3 (7.9)	62.1 (16.7)
Mean daily minimum °F (°C)	25.8 (−3.4)	27.0 (−2.8)	33.3 (0.7)	42.7 (5.9)	52.2 (11.2)	61.8 (16.6)	67.9 (19.9)	66.6 (19.2)	60.4 (15.8)	48.6 (9.2)	38.9 (3.8)	31.2 (−0.4)	46.5 (8.1)
Record low °F (°C)	−5.5 (−20.8)	1.0 (−17.2)	6.1 (−14.4)	18.3 (−7.6)	34.5 (1.4)	45.3 (7.4)	49.5 (9.7)	45.7 (7.6)	39.8 (4.3)	27.1 (−2.7)	14.6 (−9.7)	0.2 (−17.7)	−5.5 (−20.8)
Average precipitation inches (mm)	3.78 (96)	3.12 (79)	4.30 (109)	3.80 (97)	3.72 (94)	4.15 (105)	4.19 (106)	4.62 (117)	3.83 (97)	4.23 (107)	3.47 (88)	4.59 (117)	47.81 (1,214)
Average snowfall inches (cm)	8.6 (22)	7.1 (18)	4.0 (10)	0.1 (0.25)	0.0 (0.0)	0.0 (0.0)	0.0 (0.0)	0.0 (0.0)	0.0 (0.0)	0.0 (0.0)	0.3 (0.76)	3.2 (8.1)	23.4 (59)
Average dew point °F (°C)	22.4 (−5.3)	23.0 (−5.0)	28.2 (−2.1)	37.3 (2.9)	48.7 (9.3)	59.4 (15.2)	64.6 (18.1)	64.1 (17.8)	58.6 (14.8)	47.0 (8.3)	36.2 (2.3)	28.3 (−2.1)	43.2 (6.2)
Source 1: PRISM
Source 2: NOHRSC (Snow, 2008/2009 - 2022/2023 normals)

Climate data for Atlantic City, NJ Ocean Water Temperature, 1911–present normals
Month	Jan	Feb	Mar	Apr	May	Jun	Jul	Aug	Sep	Oct	Nov	Dec	Year
Daily mean °F (°C)	39.7 (4.3)	38.5 (3.6)	41.9 (5.5)	48.7 (9.3)	56.4 (13.6)	64.7 (18.2)	68.9 (20.5)	73.1 (22.8)	72.2 (22.3)	64.1 (17.8)	53.6 (12.0)	45.2 (7.3)	55.7 (13.2)
Source: NCEI

== Ecology ==
According to the A. W. Kuchler U.S. potential natural vegetation types, Belmar would have an Appalachian Oak (104) vegetation type with an Eastern Hardwood Forest (25) vegetation form.

== Notable people ==
People who were born in, residents of, or otherwise closely associated with Belmar include:

- Jay Alders (born 1973), artist and photographer
- Tom Brower (born 1965), member of the Hawaii House of Representatives
- Dave Calloway (born 1968), college basketball coach and the former head men's basketball coach at Monmouth University
- Harriett Ephrussi-Taylor (1918–1968), geneticist, microbiologist and educator, who initiated and made crucial contributions to the fields of transformation and bacterial recombination
- Christian Fuscarino (born 1990), community organizer and LGBT activist who is the executive director of Garden State Equality
- James Gallagher (1909–1992), soccer player who earned two caps with the United States national soccer team
- Michael Gerson (born 1964), political writer and commentator who served as chief speechwriter for President George W. Bush from 2001 to 2006
- Stephen L. Hoffman (born 1948), physician-scientist, tropical medicine specialist and vaccinologist
- Brian Lynch (born 1978), professional basketball player who played for the Belgian team Euphony Bree and is married to former World No. 1-ranked tennis star Kim Clijsters
- Jay Lynch (1945–2017), cartoonist best known for his comic strip Nard n' Pat
- Marina Mabrey (born 1996), basketball player with the Connecticut Sun of the Women's National Basketball Association
- Balls Mahoney (1972–2016), professional wrestler
- Joseph Mayer (1877–1942), Mayor of Belmar who later served on the Monmouth County Board of Chosen Freeholders
- Tom McGowan (born 1956), actor
- Douglas Crawford McMurtrie (1888–1944), type designer
- David Sancious (born 1953), early member of the E Street Band
- Joe Shimko (born 2000), American football long snapper for the Arizona Cardinals of the National Football League
- Sarah Spiegel, singer and actress
- Neal Sterling (born 1992), tight end who played in the NFL for the New York Jets
- E. Donald Sterner (1894–1983), politician

Preceded by Avon-by-the-Sea	Beaches of New Jersey	Succeeded by Spring Lake
