= Lake Como, New Jersey =

Borough in Monmouth County, New Jersey, US

- Borough
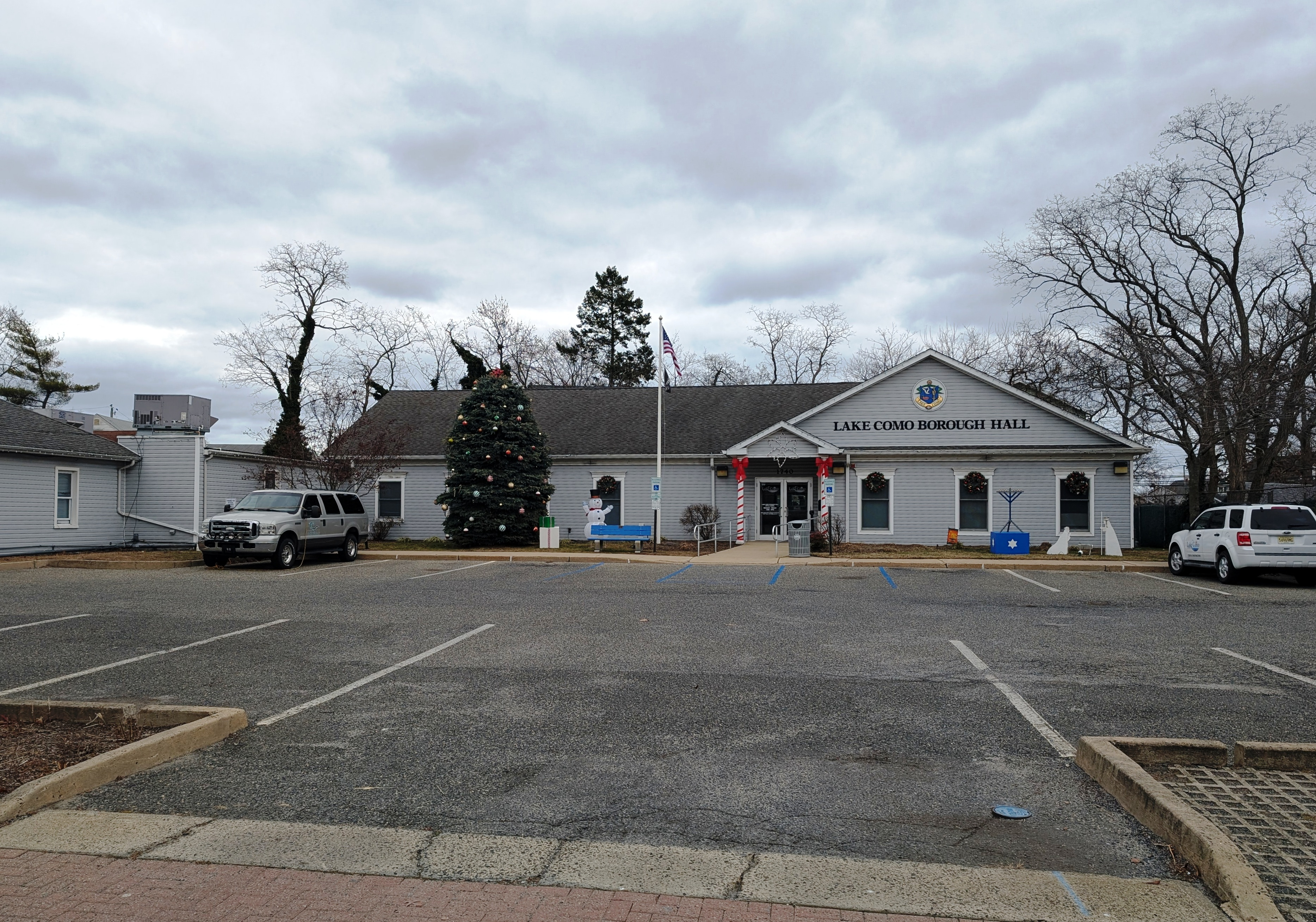
- Lake Como Borough Hall

- Seal wordmark

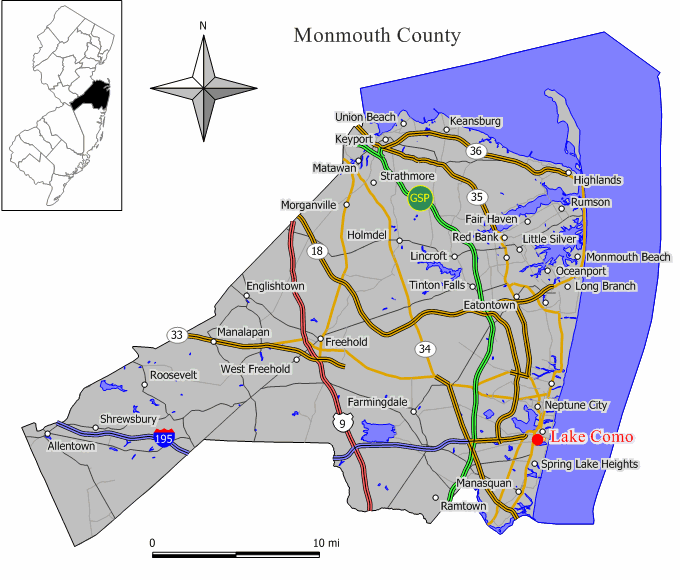
- Map of Lake Como in Monmouth County. Inset: Location of Monmouth County highlighted in the State of New Jersey.

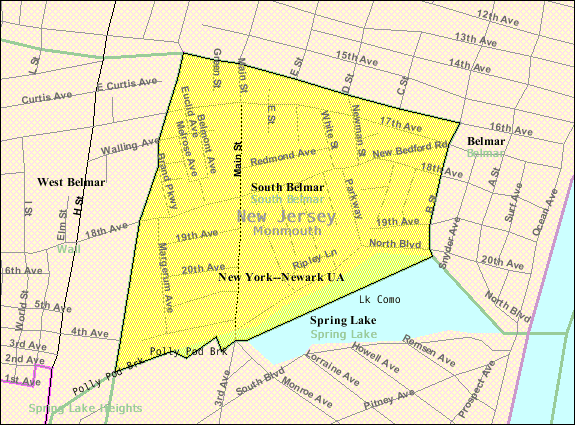
- Census Bureau map of Lake Como, New Jersey

- Location in Monmouth County Location in New Jersey Location in the United States
- Coordinates: 40.170011°N 74.024861°W
- Country: United States
- State: New Jersey
- County: Monmouth
- Incorporated: May 6, 1924 as South Belmar
- Renamed: January 4, 2005 as Lake Como

Government
  - Type: Borough
  - Body: Borough Council
  - Mayor: Kevin G. Higgins (D, term ends December 31, 2026)
  - Administrator: Andrew Huisman
  - Municipal clerk: Amy L. Boney

Area
  - Total: 0.26 sq mi (0.67 km^{2})
  - Land: 0.25 sq mi (0.65 km^{2})
  - Water: 0.0077 sq mi (0.02 km^{2}) 3.08%
  - Rank: 556th of 565 in state 51st of 53 in county
- Elevation: 16 ft (4.9 m)

Population (2020)
  - Total: 1,697
  - Estimate (2023): 1,665
  - Rank: 501st of 565 in state 45th of 53 in county
  - Density: 6,741.7/sq mi (2,603.0/km^{2})
  - Rank: 73rd of 565 in state 6th of 53 in county
- Time zone: UTC−05:00 (Eastern (EST))
  - Summer (DST): UTC−04:00 (Eastern (EDT))
- ZIP Code: 07719 – Belmar
- Area code: 732
- FIPS code: 3402537560
- GNIS feature ID: 0885400
- Website: www.lakecomonj.org

Lake Como is a borough located in the Jersey Shore region, within Monmouth County, in the U.S. state of New Jersey. As of the 2020 United States census, the borough's population was 1,697, a decrease of 62 (−3.5%) from the 2010 census count of 1,759, which in turn reflected a decline of 47 (−2.6%) from the 1,806 counted in the 2000 census. It is the tenth-smallest municipality by land area in New Jersey.

Lake Como was originally formed as the borough of South Belmar by an act of the New Jersey Legislature on March 12, 1924, from portions of Wall Township, subject to the results of a referendum held on May 6, 1924. On November 2, 2004, voters in the borough approved changing the locality's name to Lake Como, which became effective as of January 4, 2005.

== Geography ==
According to the United States Census Bureau, the borough had a total area of 0.26 square miles (0.67 km^{2}), including 0.25 square miles (0.65 km^{2}) of land and 0.01 square miles (0.02 km^{2}) of water (3.08%).

The borough borders the Monmouth County communities of Belmar, Spring Lake, Spring Lake Heights and Wall Township.

== Demographics ==
Historical population
Census	Pop.	Note	%±
1930	886		—
1940	955		7.8%
1950	1,294		35.5%
1960	1,537		18.8%
1970	1,490		−3.1%
1980	1,566		5.1%
1990	1,482		−5.4%
2000	1,806		21.9%
2010	1,759		−2.6%
2020	1,697		−3.5%
2023 (est.)	1,665	▼	−1.9%
Population sources: 1930 1940–2000; 2000 2010 2020

=== 2010 census ===
The 2010 United States census counted 1,759 people, 785 households, and 399 families in the borough. The population density was 6,943.6 per square mile (2,680.9/km^{2}). There were 1,115 housing units at an average density of 4,401.4 per square mile (1,699.4/km^{2}). The racial makeup was 82.89% (1,458) White, 6.14% (108) Black or African American, 0.85% (15) Native American, 1.19% (21) Asian, 0.00% (0) Pacific Islander, 6.82% (120) from other races, and 2.10% (37) from two or more races. Hispanic or Latino of any race were 18.31% (322) of the population.

Of the 785 households, 22.9% had children under the age of 18; 34.9% were married couples living together; 10.7% had a female householder with no husband present and 49.2% were non-families. Of all households, 38.6% were made up of individuals and 9.4% had someone living alone who was 65 years of age or older. The average household size was 2.24 and the average family size was 3.05.

19.6% of the population were under the age of 18, 9.6% from 18 to 24, 33.4% from 25 to 44, 26.9% from 45 to 64, and 10.5% who were 65 years of age or older. The median age was 38.4 years. For every 100 females, the population had 105.3 males. For every 100 females ages 18 and older there were 102.7 males.

The Census Bureau's 2006–2010 American Community Survey showed that (in 2010 inflation-adjusted dollars) median household income was $76,576 (with a margin of error of +/− $8,374) and the median family income was $84,821 (+/− $15,308). Males had a median income of $58,173 (+/− $11,703) versus $49,444 (+/− $25,611) for females. The per capita income for the borough was $37,729 (+/− $5,783). About 10.8% of families and 7.9% of the population were below the poverty line, including 12.5% of those under age 18 and 3.5% of those age 65 or over.

=== 2000 census ===
As of the 2000 United States census there were 1,806 people, 824 households, and 391 families residing in the borough. The population density was 7,322.9 inhabitants per square mile (2,827.4/km^{2}). There were 1,107 housing units at an average density of 4,488.6 per square mile (1,733.1/km^{2}). The racial makeup of the borough was 82.17% White, 7.75% African American, 0.44% Native American, 1.27% Asian, 0.06% Pacific Islander, 5.87% from other races, and 2.44% from two or more races. Hispanic or Latino of any race were 10.13% of the population.

There were 824 households, out of which 22.9% had children under the age of 18 living with them, 31.3% were married couples living together, 10.8% had a female householder with no husband present, and 52.5% were non-families. 41.1% of all households were made up of individuals, and 12.3% had someone living alone who was 65 years of age or older. The average household size was 2.19 and the average family size was 3.10.

In the borough the population was spread out, with 21.8% under the age of 18, 8.5% from 18 to 24, 36.7% from 25 to 44, 20.2% from 45 to 64, and 13.0% who were 65 years of age or older. The median age was 36 years. For every 100 females, there were 102.2 males. For every 100 females age 18 and over, there were 97.1 males.

The median income for a household in the borough was $47,566, and the median income for a family was $56,538. Males had a median income of $41,550 versus $27,708 for females. The per capita income for the borough was $27,111. About 4.3% of families and 7.5% of the population were below the poverty line, including 8.2% of those under age 18 and 5.3% of those age 65 or over.

== Government ==
=== Local government ===
Lake Como is governed under the borough form of New Jersey municipal government, which is used in 218 municipalities (of the 564) statewide, making it the most common form of government in New Jersey. The governing body is comprised of the mayor and the borough council, with all positions elected at-large on a partisan basis as part of the November general election. A mayor is elected directly by the voters to a four-year term of office. The borough council includes six members elected to serve three-year terms on a staggered basis, with two seats coming up for election each year in a three-year cycle. The borough form of government used by Lake Como is a "weak mayor / strong council" government in which council members act as the legislative body with the mayor presiding at meetings and voting only in the event of a tie. The mayor can veto ordinances subject to an override by a two-thirds majority vote of the council. The mayor makes committee and liaison assignments for council members, and most appointments are made by the mayor with the advice and consent of the council.

As of 2025, the mayor of Lake Como is Democrat Kevin Higgins, whose term of office ends December 31, 2026. Members of the Borough Council are Council President Douglas E. Witte (D, 2025), Heather Albala-Doyle (D, 2027), Chris D'Antuono (D, 2027), Nicholas DeMauro (D, 2026), Hawley G. Scull (D, 2025) and Peter Ventrice (D, 2026).

In February 2021, the borough council considered three candidates whose names were submitted by the Democratic municipal committee and chose Peter Ventrice to fill the seat expiring in December 2023 that had been held by David Gardner until he resigned from office the previous month. Ventrice served on an interim basis until the November 2021 general election, when he was selected to serve the balance of the term of office.

In September 2019, the borough council selected Nicholas DeMauro from a list of three candidates nominated by the Democratic municipal committee to fill the seat expiring in December 2020 that was vacated by John Carvelli after he resigned from office the previous month after announcing that he was moving out of Lake Como.

In September 2018, David Gardner was appointed to fill the seat expiring in December 2020 that had been vacated by Kevin Higgins, who was appointed mayor the previous monthto fill the seat vacated by Brian T. Wilton. Kevin Higgins and David Gardner served and were elected to their respective positions in November 2018. Kevin Higgins was elected to a full four-year term ending December 2022.

In January 2017, Christopher D'Antuono was appointed to fill the seat expiring in December 2018 that was vacated by Michael Noonan; D'Antono will serve on an interim basis until the November 2017 general election, when voters will select a candidate to serve the balance of the term of office.

In January 2015, the borough council selected Hawley Scull from three names nominated by the Democratic municipal committee to fill the vacant seat of Patricia A. Tzibrouk expiring in December 2016. In the November 2015 general election, Scull was elected to serve the balance of the term of office.

Later in January 2015, the borough council chose Michael Noonan to fill the council seat expiring December 2015 that was vacated when Brian Wilton took office as mayor.

=== Federal, state and county representation ===
Lake Como is located in the 4th Congressional District and is part of New Jersey's 30th state legislative district.

For the 119th United States Congress, New Jersey's 4th congressional district is represented by Chris Smith (R, Manchester Township). New Jersey is represented in the United States Senate by Democrats Cory Booker (Newark, term ends 2027) and Andy Kim (Moorestown, term ends 2031).

For the 2026–2027 session, the 30th legislative district of the New Jersey Legislature is represented in the State Senate by Robert Singer (R, Lakewood Township) and in the General Assembly by Sean T. Kean (R, Wall Township) and Avi Schnall (D, Lakewood Township).

Monmouth County is governed by a Board of County Commissioners composed of five members who are elected at-large to serve three-year terms of office on a staggered basis, with either one or two seats up for election each year as part of the November general election. At an annual reorganization meeting held in the beginning of January, the board selects one of its members to serve as director and another as deputy director.

As of 2025, Monmouth County's Commissioners are Director Thomas A. Arnone (R, Neptune City, 2025), Susan M. Kiley (R, Hazlet Township, 2027), Erik Anderson (R, Shrewsbury, 2026), Nick DiRocco (R, Wall Township, 2025), and Deputy Director Ross F. Licitra (R, Marlboro Township, 2026).

Constitutional officers elected on a countywide basis are Clerk Christine Giordano Hanlon (R, 2025; Ocean Township), Sheriff Shaun Golden (R, 2025; Howell Township) and Surrogate Rosemarie D. Peters (R, 2026; Middletown Township).

=== Politics ===
United States presidential election results for Lake Como
Year	Republican		Democratic		Third party(ies)	
Year	No.	%	No.	%	No.	%
2024	461	47.72%	473	48.96%	32	3.31%
2020	436	44.67%	526	53.89%	14	1.43%
2016	388	48.26%	384	47.76%	32	3.98%
2012	295	42.20%	390	55.79%	14	2.00%
2008	314	39.75%	459	58.10%	17	2.15%
2004	374	45.95%	428	52.58%	12	1.47%
2000	311	40.81%	409	53.67%	42	5.51%
1996	250	33.07%	411	54.37%	95	12.57%
1992	234	31.84%	337	45.85%	164	22.31%

As of March 2011, there were a total of 992 registered voters in Lake Como, of which 301 (30.3%) were registered as Democrats, 151 (15.2%) were registered as Republicans and 539 (54.3%) were registered as Unaffiliated. There was one voter registered to another party.

In the 2012 presidential election, Democrat Barack Obama received 55.8% of the vote (390 cast), ahead of Republican Mitt Romney with 42.2% (295 votes), and other candidates with 2.0% (14 votes), among the 706 ballots cast by the borough's 1,057 registered voters (7 ballots were spoiled), for a turnout of 66.8%. In the 2008 presidential election, Democrat Barack Obama received 57.1% of the vote (459 cast), ahead of Republican John McCain with 39.1% (314 votes) and other candidates with 2.1% (17 votes), among the 804 ballots cast by the borough's 1,123 registered voters, for a turnout of 71.6%. In the 2004 presidential election, Democrat John Kerry received 52.5% of the vote (428 ballots cast), outpolling Republican George W. Bush with 45.8% (374 votes) and other candidates with 1.0% (12 votes), among the 816 ballots cast by the borough's 1,156 registered voters, for a turnout percentage of 70.6.

Gubernatorial election results for Lake Como
Year	Republican		Democratic		Third party(ies)	
Year	No.	%	No.	%	No.	%
2025	384	45.99%	443	53.05%	8	0.96%
2021	343	51.66%	313	47.14%	8	1.20%
2017	232	47.74%	243	50.00%	11	2.26%
2013	298	64.22%	150	32.33%	16	3.45%
2009	262	49.62%	215	40.72%	51	9.66%
2005	245	39.26%	325	52.08%	54	8.65%

In the 2013 gubernatorial election, Republican Chris Christie received 64.2% of the vote (298 cast), ahead of Democrat Barbara Buono with 32.3% (150 votes), and other candidates with 3.4% (16 votes), among the 470 ballots cast by the borough's 1,047 registered voters (6 ballots were spoiled), for a turnout of 44.9%. In the 2009 gubernatorial election, Republican Chris Christie received 49.1% of the vote (262 ballots cast), ahead of Democrat Jon Corzine with 40.3% (215 votes), Independent Chris Daggett with 8.8% (47 votes) and other candidates with 0.7% (4 votes), among the 534 ballots cast by the borough's 1,048 registered voters, yielding a 51.0% turnout.

United States Senate election results for Lake Como1
Year	Republican		Democratic		Third party(ies)	
Year	No.	%	No.	%	No.	%
2024	449	48.12%	469	50.27%	15	1.61%
2018	310	45.45%	338	49.56%	34	4.99%
2012	266	40.92%	368	56.62%	16	2.46%
2006	261	44.46%	310	52.81%	16	2.73%

United States Senate election results for Lake Como2
Year	Republican		Democratic		Third party(ies)	
Year	No.	%	No.	%	No.	%
2020	452	47.18%	493	51.46%	13	1.36%
2014	187	39.12%	273	57.11%	18	3.77%
2013	126	44.06%	158	55.24%	2	0.70%
2008	280	38.57%	419	57.71%	27	3.72%

== Education ==
Students from Lake Como attend the Belmar School District, which serves students in public school for pre-kindergarten through eighth grade at Belmar Elementary School. Lake Como sends students to Belmar as part of a sending/receiving relationship. As of the 2023–24 school year, the district, comprised of one school, had an enrollment of 405 students and 51.7 classroom teachers (on an FTE basis), for a student–teacher ratio of 7.8:1.

Students attending public high school are assigned based on sending/receiving relationships to either Manasquan High School in Manasquan or Asbury Park High School in Asbury Park. Manasquan High School also serves students from Avon-by-the-Sea, Brielle, Sea Girt, Spring Lake and Spring Lake Heights, who attend as part of sending/receiving relationships with their respective districts. As of the 2023–24 school year, Manasquan High School had an enrollment of 945 students and 81.2 classroom teachers (on an FTE basis), for a student–teacher ratio of 11.6:1 while Asbury Park High School had an enrollment of 370 students and 36.0 classroom teachers (on an FTE basis), for a student–teacher ratio of 10.3:1.

Public school students may also attend Red Bank Regional High School, Marine Academy of Science and Technology, Academy of Allied Health & Science, Academy Charter School, High Technology High School, Communications High School or Biotechnology High School. They also have the option to attend Academy Charter High School in Lake Como, which accepts students on a lottery basis from the communities of Allenhurst, Asbury Park, Avon-by-the-Sea, Belmar, Bradley Beach, Deal, Interlaken and Lake Como.

== Transportation ==
=== Roads and highways ===
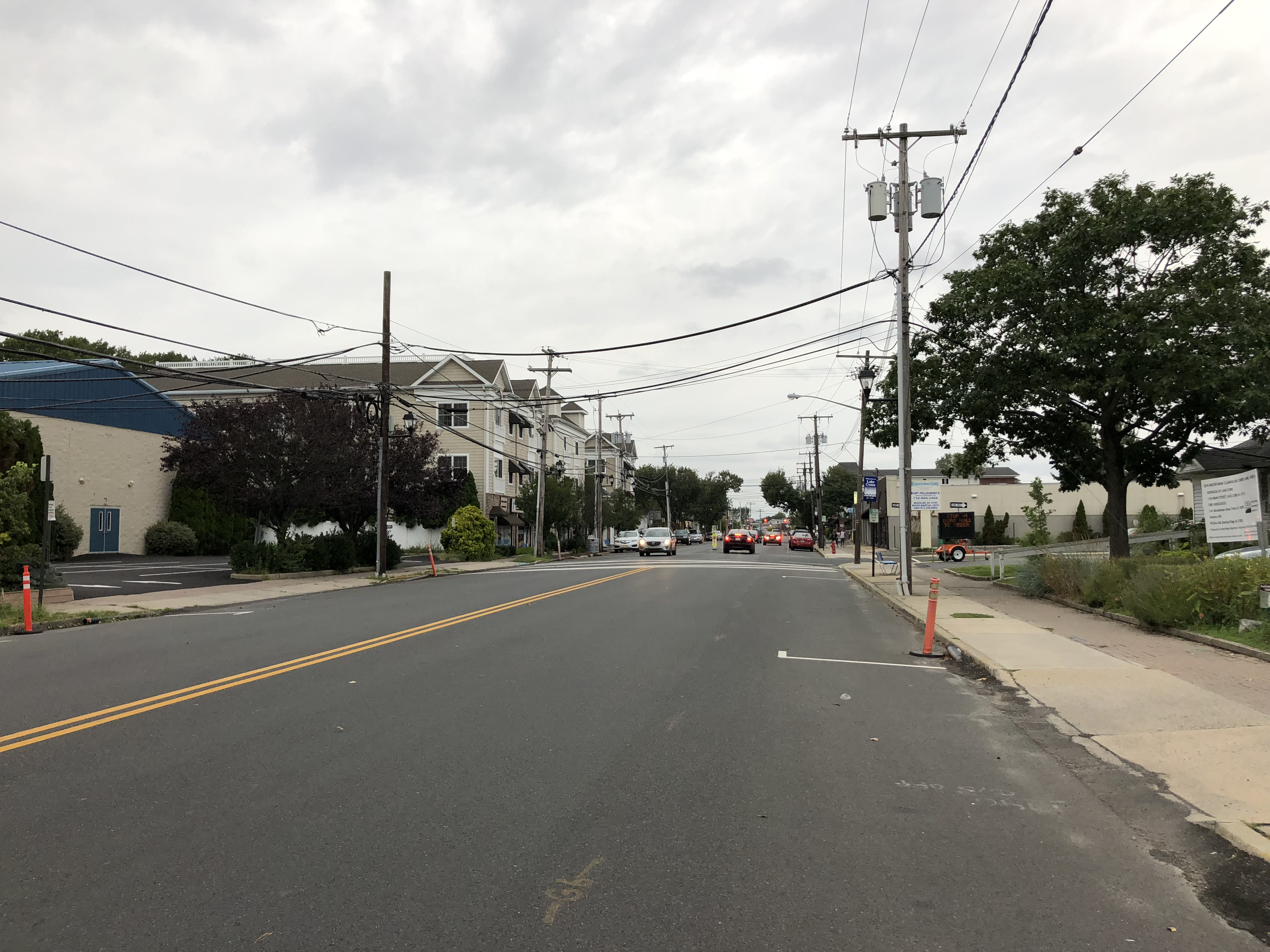
Northbound County Route 30 (Main Street) in Lake Como

As of May 2010, the borough had a total of 5.47 miles (8.80 km) of roadways, of which 5.03 miles (8.10 km) were maintained by the municipality and 0.44 miles (0.71 km) by Monmouth County.

No major highways pass directly through the borough. The most significant roads are minor county routes, such as County Route 30, which serves as Main Street. However, several highways are accessible in neighboring communities, such as Route 35 in both Belmar and Wall, as well as Route 18, Route 34, Route 138, the Garden State Parkway and Interstate 195 all in Wall Township.

=== Public transportation ===
NJ Transit offers service to and from Philadelphia on the 317 route and local bus service on the 830 route.

== Notable people ==
People who were born in, residents of, or otherwise closely associated with Lake Como include:

- Walter McAfee (1914–1995), African-American scientist and astronomer, who participated in the world's first lunar radar echo experiments as part of Project Diana
