= Academy Charter High School =

Charter school in Monmouth County, New Jersey, US

Address
- 1725 Main Street Lake Como, Monmouth County, New Jersey, 07719; United States
- Coordinates: 40.1712°N 74.0278°W

District information
- Grades: Charter
- Superintendent: Mary Jo McKinley (Director)
- Business administrator: Vacant
- Schools: 1

Students and staff
- Enrollment: 176 (as of 2024–25)
- Faculty: 18.5 FTEs
- Student–teacher ratio: 9.5:1

Other information
- District Factor Group: NA
- Website: academycharterhs.org
Ind.	Per pupil	District spending	Rank (*)	Charter average	%± vs. average
1A	Total Spending	$19,143	60	$18,047	6.1%
1	Budgetary Cost	14,764	63	13,238	11.5%
2	Classroom Instruction	7,886	57	7,328	7.6%
6	Support Services	1,968	58	1,661	18.5%
8	Administrative Cost	2,957	64	2,563	15.4%
10	Operations & Maintenance	1,955	50	1,661	17.7%
13	Extracurricular Activities	0	0	1	−100.0%
16	Median Teacher Salary	52,500	47	50,669
Data from NJDoE 2013 Taxpayers' Guide to Education Spending. *Of Charter districts with any number of students. Lowest spending=1; Highest=77

Academy Charter High School

Information
- Type: Charter public high school
- Established: 1998
- NCES School ID: 340004800335
- Faculty: 18.5 FTEs
- Grades: 9-12
- Enrollment: 166 (as of 2024–25)
- Student to teacher ratio: 9.0:1
- Colors: Royal Blue and Red
- Team name: Panthers

Academy Charter High School is a four-year charter public high school located in Lake Como, in Monmouth County, in the U.S. state of New Jersey, that operates independently of the local school district under the terms of a charter granted by the Commissioner of the New Jersey Department of Education. The school serves residents of Allenhurst, Asbury Park, Neptune, Avon-by-the-Sea, Belmar, Bradley Beach, Deal, Interlaken and Lake Como. Students are accepted at the school on a lottery basis with seats in the incoming freshman class allocated in proportion to the population of each of the participating municipalities and any remaining unfilled seats are then offered to residents of other communities.

Academy Charter High School opened in September 1998. Maximum enrollment authorized by the state is 220 students.

As of the 2024–25 school year, the school had an enrollment of 166 students and 18.5 classroom teachers (on an FTE basis), for a student–teacher ratio of 9.0:1. There were 118 students (71.1% of enrollment) eligible for free lunch and 25 (15.1% of students) eligible for reduced-cost lunch.

== Athletics ==
The Academy Charter High School Panthers play independently of any conference in play under the auspices of the New Jersey State Interscholastic Athletic Association (NJSIAA). With 126 students in grades 10–12, the school was classified by the NJSIAA for the 2019–20 school year as Group I for most athletic competition purposes, which included schools with an enrollment of 75 to 476 students in that grade range.

The 2008 boys' basketball team won the Central, Group I state sectional championship with a 62–55 win over Asbury Park High School in the tournament final, earning the team's first ever sectional title in their first title game.
